= Terrace houses in Australia =

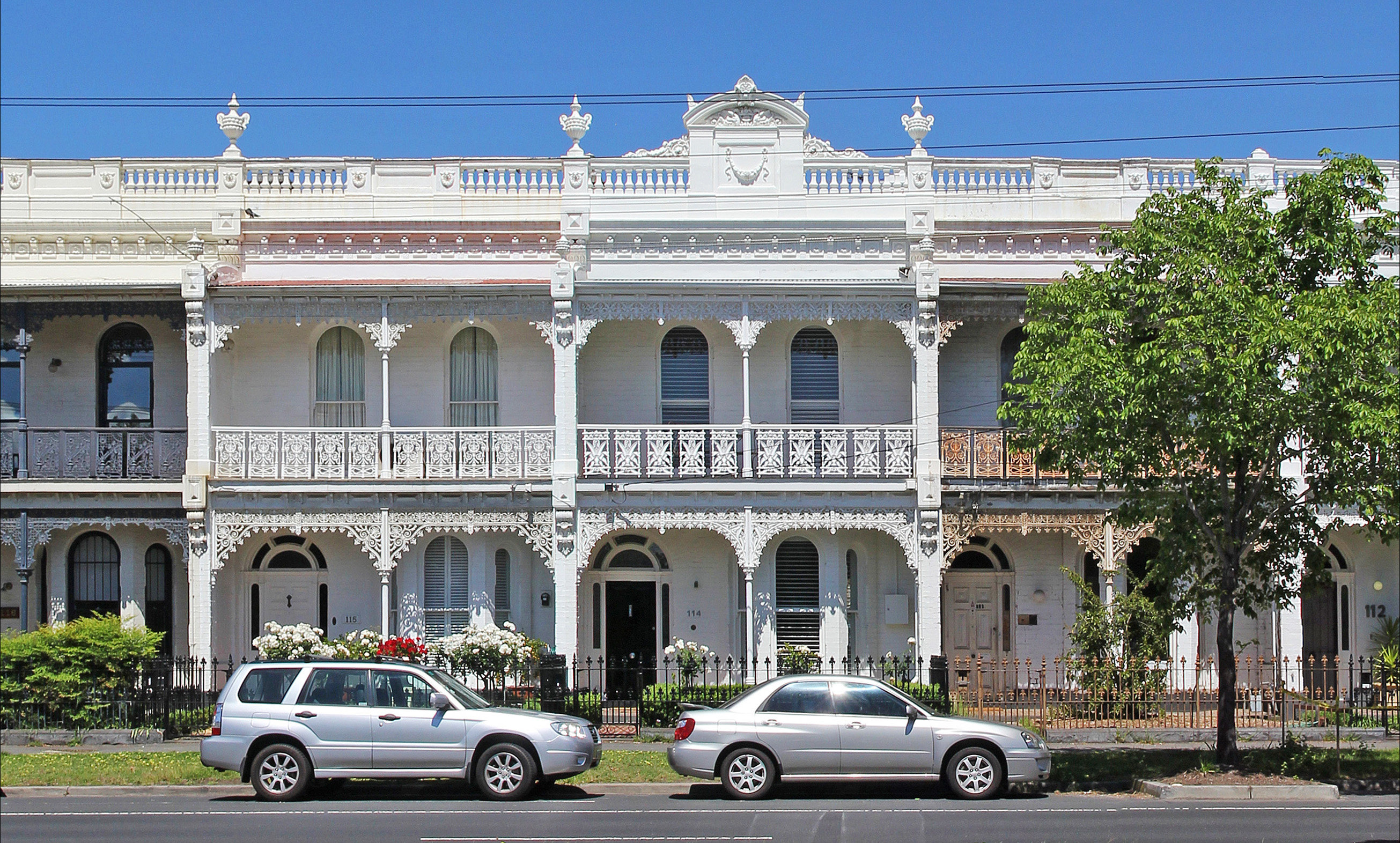
Row of terraced houses in Middle Park, Melbourne, typical of those in the inner suburbs of Melbourne

Terrace houses in Australia began to be built in early 19th century Sydney, closely based on the models found in London and other UK cities. They soon developed unique features, particularly elaborate balconies, and became a very popular form of housing right through the Victorian era, with some still built in the Federation era. Large numbers of terraced houses were built in the inner suburbs of the two large Australian cities, Sydney and Melbourne, mainly between the 1850s and the 1890s, with some examples in the smaller cities and towns.

This was a period of population boom started by the Victorian and New South Wales Gold Rushes of the 1850s and finished by the economic depression in the early 1890s. Detached housing had also been built in suburbs further out, and in the smaller cities and towns, and became much more popular by the time of Federation in 1901 in Australia, and became the norm after WW1.

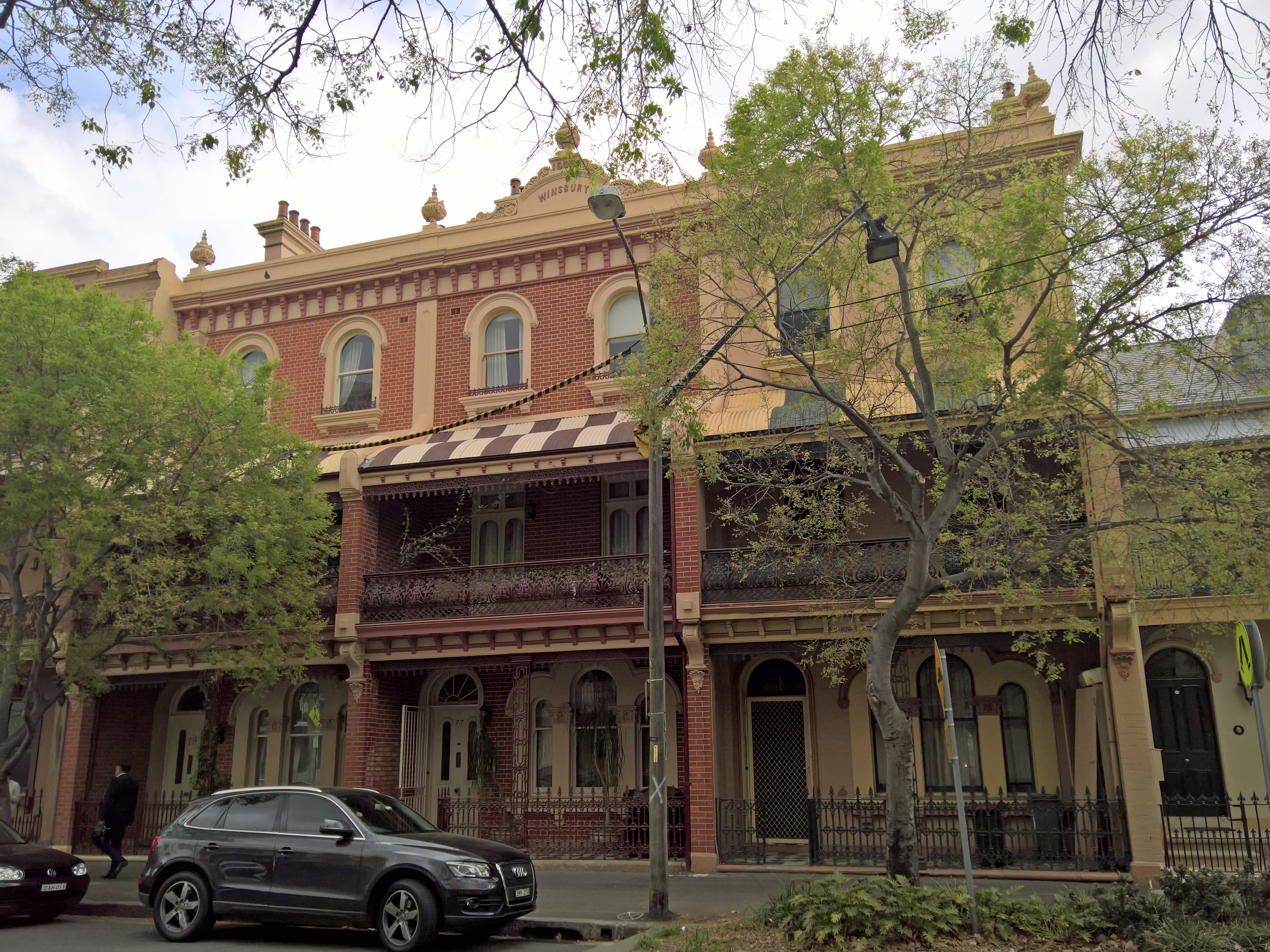
Winsbury Terrace, (c. 1875), in Millers Point, Sydney

From the 1970s new townhouse type developments, sometimes nostalgically evoking old style terraces in a modern style, began to be built in inner and even middle areas. At the same time, older terraced houses in Australian cities became increasingly sought after, for their charm and proximity to the CBD, and by the 2010s became expensive real estate, much like inner city terraces in London and row houses in New York and elsewhere.

== History and description ==
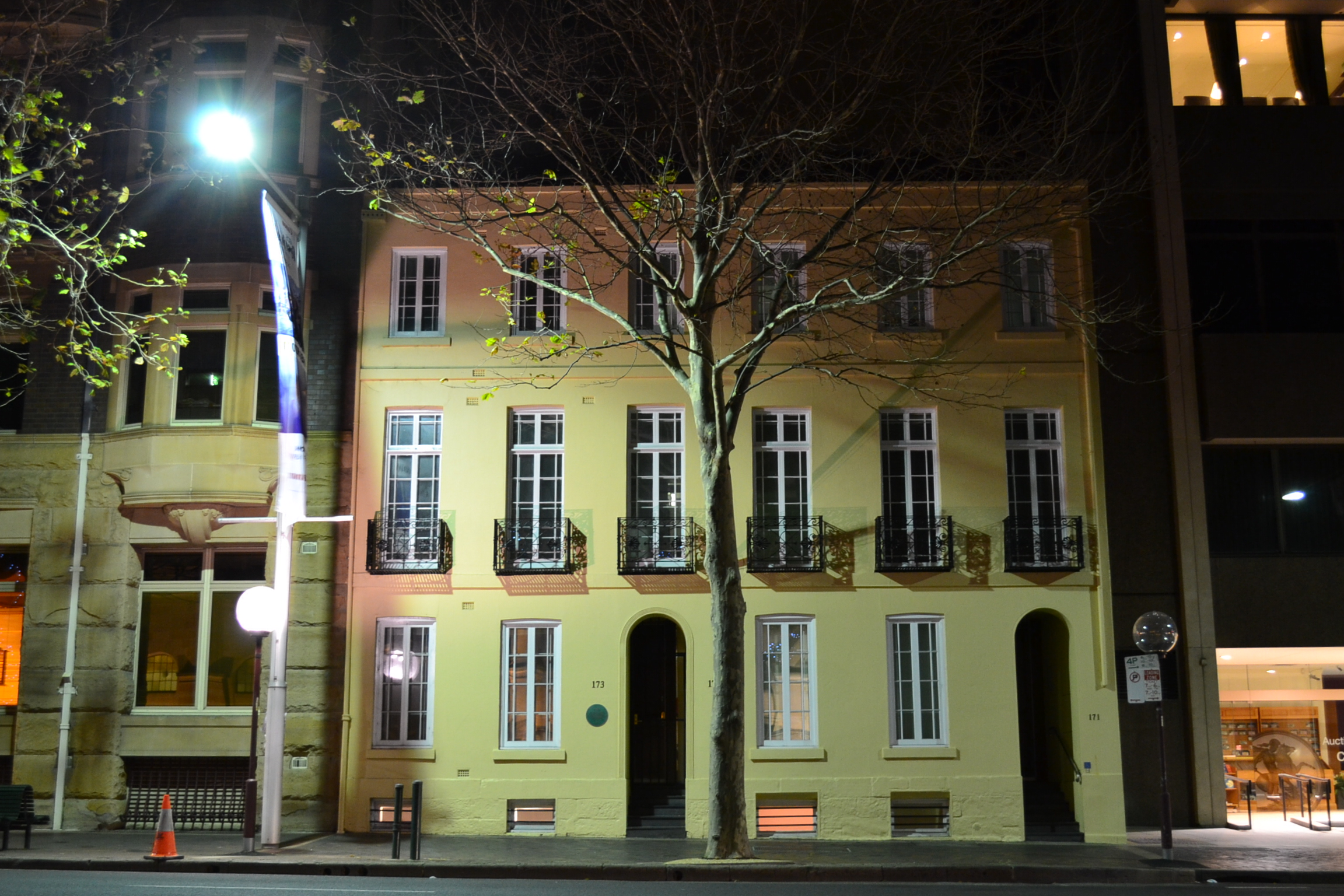
Horbury Terrace (c.1843) in Sydney is one of the earliest surviving examples of terraced housing in Australia.

Terraced housing in Australia ranged from expensive middle-class houses of three, four and five storeys down to single-storey cottages in working-class suburbs. The most common building material used was brick, often covered with stucco.

Many terraces were built in the Filigree style, characterised by cast iron balustrades and trim on the verandahs, sometimes up to three storeys. Many terraces were built speculatively, sometimes a whole block length of 12 or more identical houses, but most often with fewer, and there are many single examples as well, built individually on subdivided blocks, in a street mixed with longer rows and sometimes detached houses, and with varied setbacks. There are also examples of 'semi-detached' terraces, with each having a side setback.

At the beginning of the twentieth-century, with the growth of suburban areas of detached houses, terrace houses in Australia fell into disfavour, along with the inner city areas, and many became considered slums. In the 1950s, urban renewal programs were often aimed at eradicating them entirely, not infrequently in favour of high-rise development. From as early as the 1960s, there has been a very strong revival of interest in terraced houses in inner-city areas, with most inner city areas gentrified by the early 21st century.

== Origins ==
While the practice of building attached houses that share a common wall is not a new one – and can be seen in Pompeii and in walled Medieval cities in Europe – the combining of these separate dwellings into a single, unified row of houses is a modern concept. Early examples include Gothic ecclesiastical accommodation, such as Vicars' Close, Wells, and early European instances of town planning, such as the Place des Vosges, Paris. The canal houses of 16th-17th century Dutch and Belgian cities were often built uniformly to the property line. As with Australian terraces, frontages were narrow, allowing as many houses as possible to cram along the banks of the canal. When the first owner of the house had more houses built by the same carpenter or contractor and using the same or mirrored design these were called twin or triplet houses.

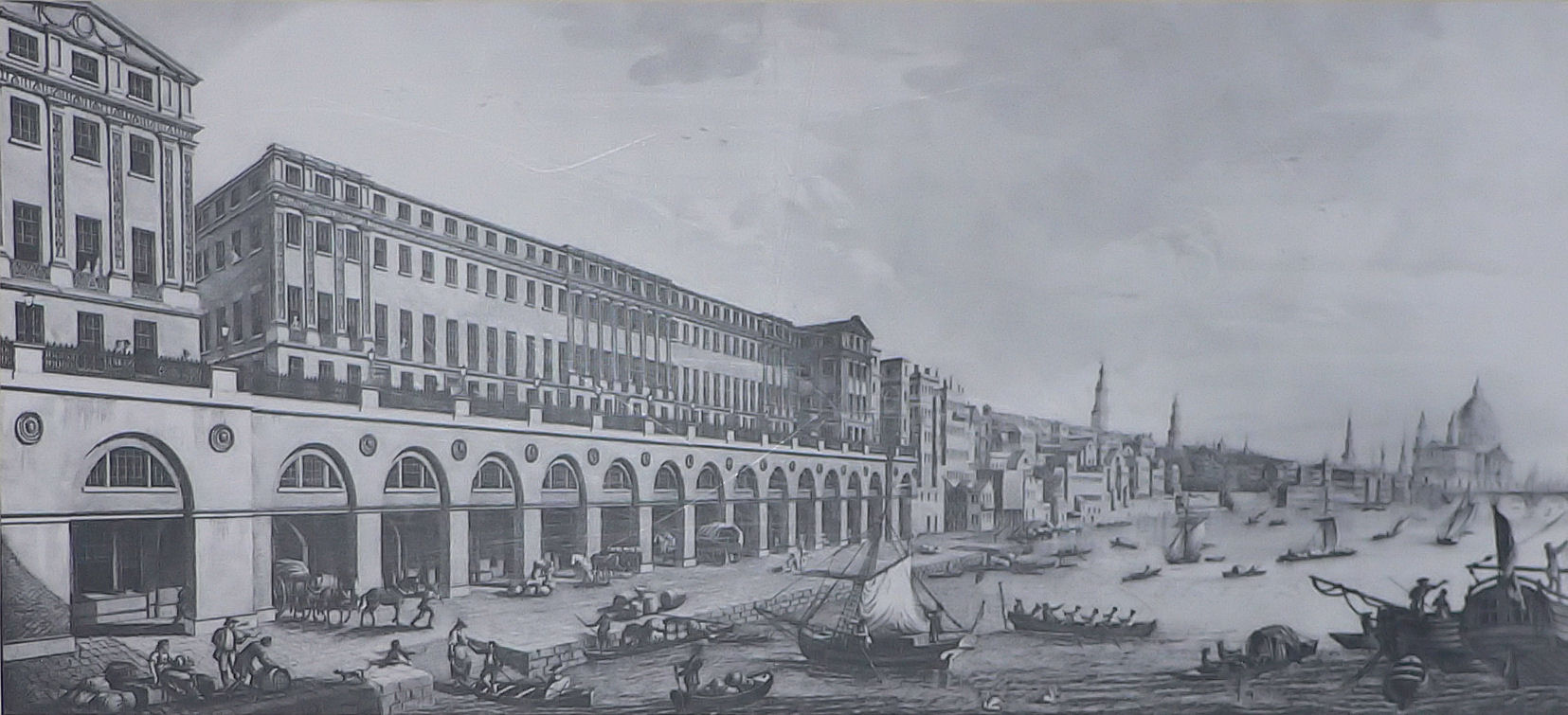
Grouped in one long continuous frontage, Adelphi (1768–74) is the first to have the term 'terras' applied to it.

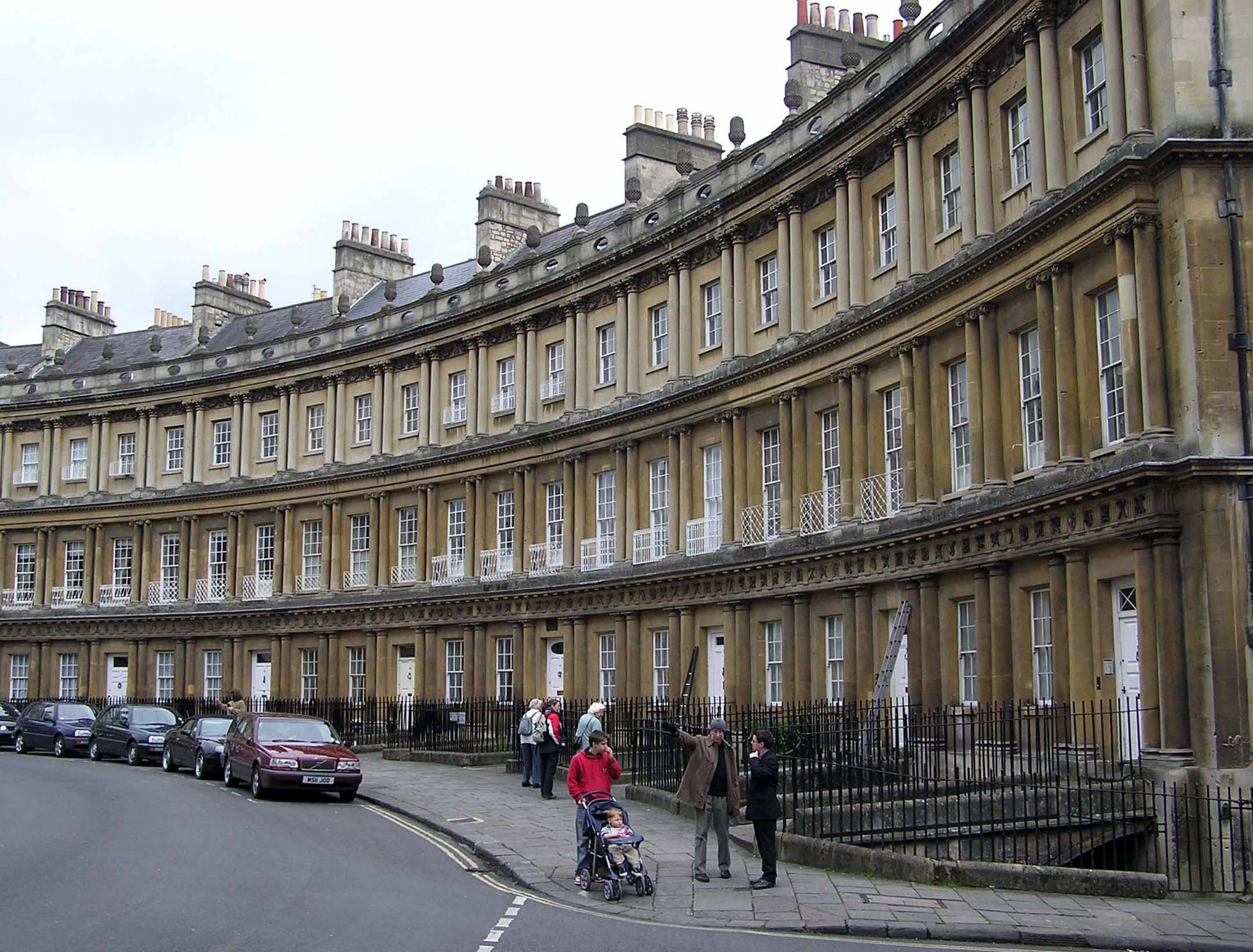
The Circus, Bath (1754–1768).

In the aftermath of the Great Fire of London, streets of houses with identical fronts were built as a result of the Rebuilding Act 1666 that was passed to regulate the reconstruction. The Act specified the types of houses that could be built, and this had the effect of standardising much of the new housing stock. For instance, houses of the Third Sort were specified as being three storeys plus cellars and garret, with the height of the first floor being 10 ft, the second floor being 8 ft and a half, and so on. In the Georgian Era, the concept of a single, unified row began to take form, where rows of houses started being treated as if they were one long palace frontage by giving the houses columned fronts under a shared pediment, as can be seen London's Grosvenor Square (1727) and in Bath's Queen Square (1729). The Adelphi, a block of 24 unified neoclassical terrace houses built between 1768 and 1774 by the Adam Brothers, was the first to have the term 'terras' applied to it. The building was influenced heavily by Robert Adam's visit in 1755 to Diocletian's Palace in Split, Croatia (previously Dalmatia). Similar to the Palace, the houses of Adelphi terrace are grouped in one long continuous frontage. The houses shared common walls and identical brick facades decorated with stucco pilasters. Notable terraces from this era include The Circus, Bath (1754–1768), Royal Crescent, Bath (1767 and 1774), Cavendish Crescent, Bath (1817–23), Chester Terrace, London (1825), Brunswick Terrace, Brighton, (1828), and Carlton House Terrace, London (1827–1832).

The terrace became the prevalent form of housing in Georgian-era England, where most of the urban population lived in row, or terrace houses. It was natural therefore, that the inhabitants of the fledgling Australian cities of Sydney and Hobart should look to imitate their homeland. According to Brian Turner, author of Australia's Iron Lace (1985) and The Australian Terrace House (1995), the first recorded terrace in Australia is believed to be Underwood's Tenements. Built before 1826 by James Underwood on George Street, Sydney, it consisted of a terrace of shops with residences above. One of the earliest surviving examples of residential terraced housing is Horbury Terrace (built circa 1836), which was 'the private residence of many respectable families'. Of the original seven houses only two are still standing today, at 171 and 173 Macquarie Street. Like other Sydney and Hobart terraces of this era, Horbury Terrace mirrored the prevailing Regency architecture style popular in London at the time. It had a chaste, simple Georgian facade with symmetrically placed eight-pane windows. Most notably, imported from Regency London are the small, uncovered balconettes decorated with airy, Regency-style cast iron railings. The balconettes are believed to have been partly decorative and partly functional, providing a safe platform for cleaning windows.

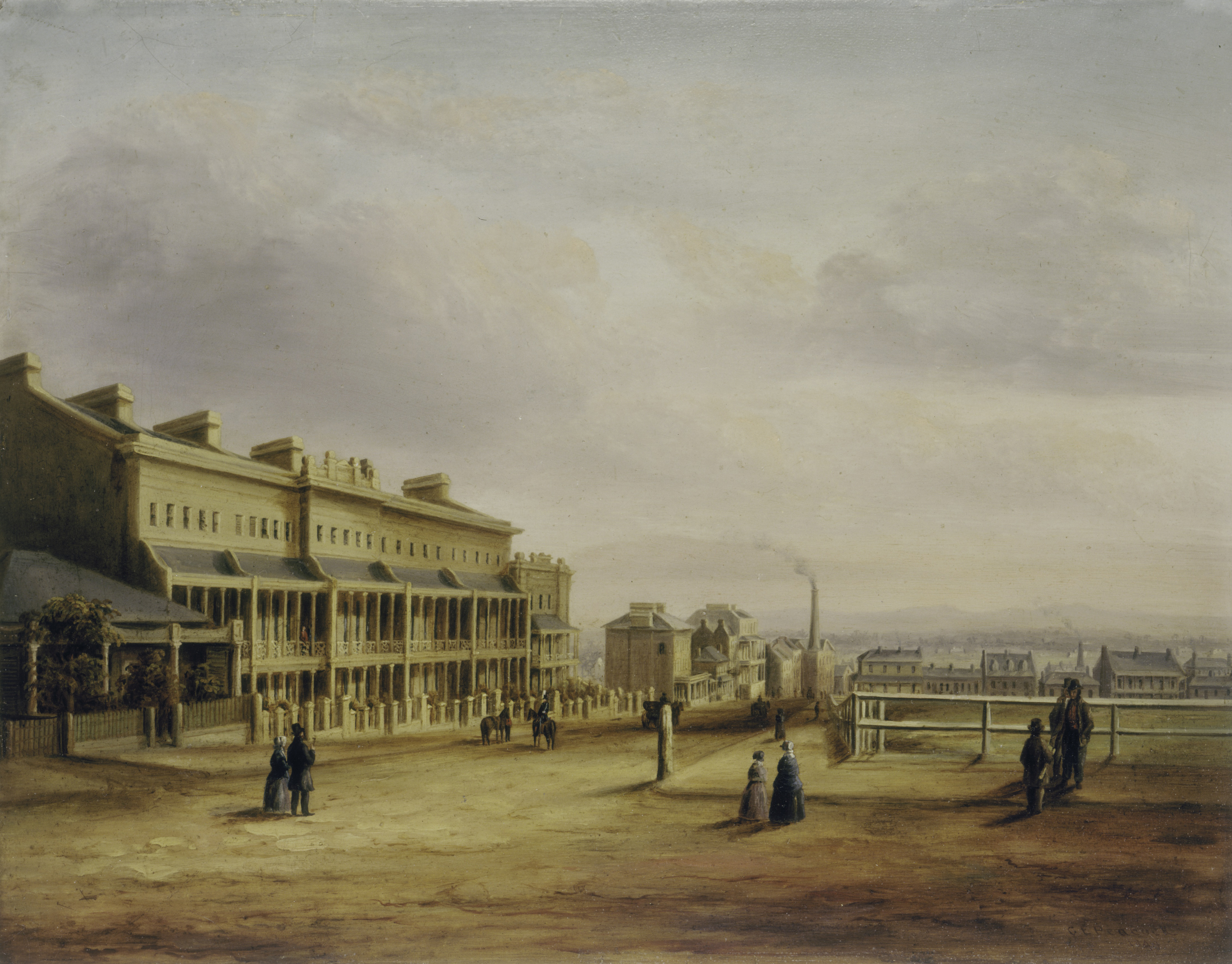
Lyons Terrace, completed in 1841, shown here in this painting by G. E. Peacock from 1849. (Dixson Galleries, State Library of New South Wales)

In 1841, Lyons Terrace was built overlooking Hyde Park for Samuel Lyons, a successful auctioneer and former convict. Three years before its completion, the Building Act 1837 had been passed by the Legislative Assembly of New South Wales. Some of its most prominent measures dealt with fire control, and it required Lyons Terrace to have its party walls raised 1 foot and 6 inches above the roof-line. In a significant departure from the unroofed balconettes of the time, the houses of Lyons Terrace featured repeated, covered balconies with cast iron balustrades on the first two floors. Lyons Terrace obviously had an effect on the young city. It was repeatedly painted and photographed by locals and visitors alike, and curiously, time and time again it is marked in maps of the city, as if considered a landmark. Out of all the terraces built in Regency-era Sydney, it is Lyons Terrace that Brian Turner considers to be "the prototype for the thousands of Sydney terrace houses that followed."

== New South Wales ==
=== Sydney ===
As the oldest city in the country, the city of Sydney possesses the country's oldest European buildings and houses, and showcases many of the styles and trends of Australian architecture.

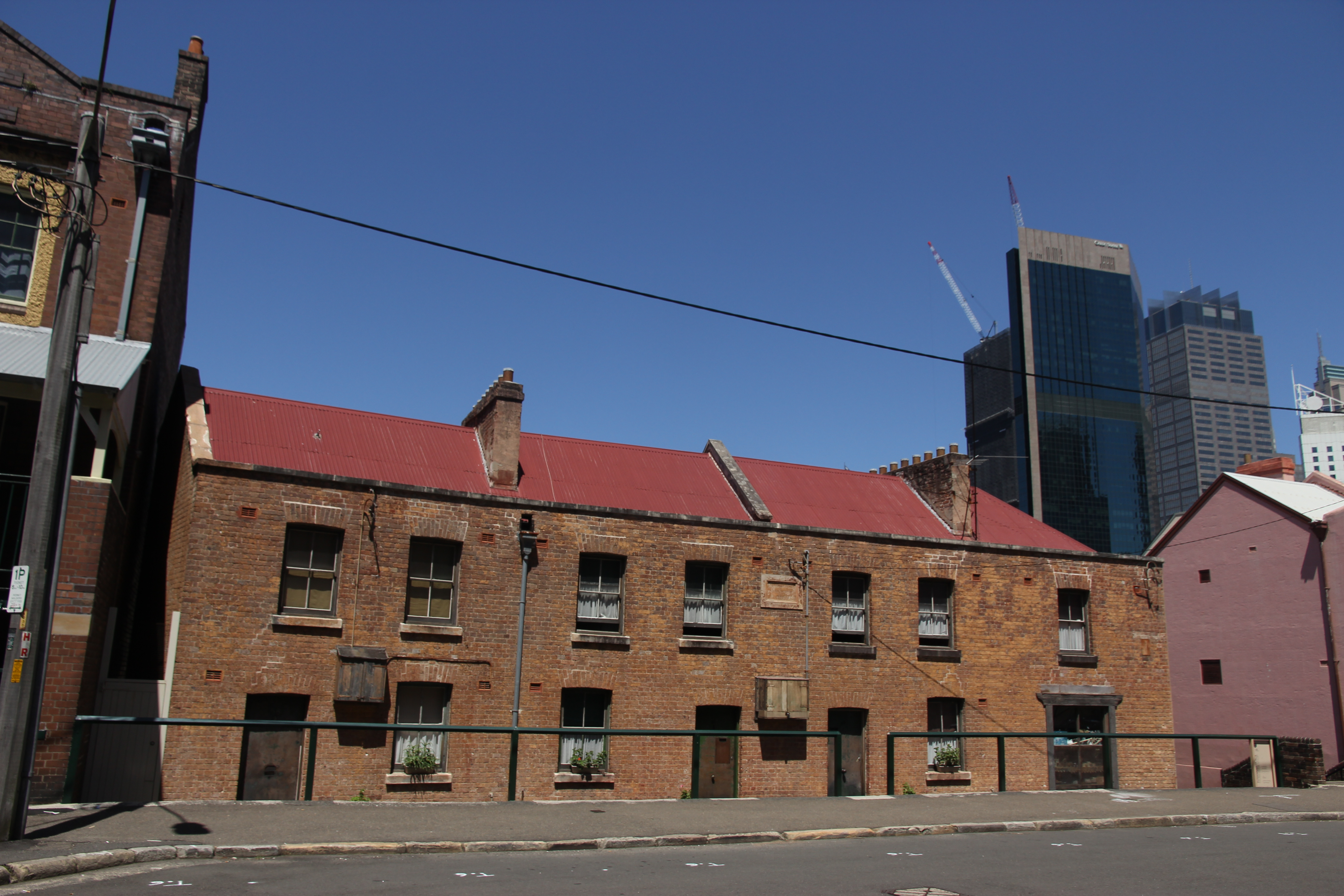
Susannah Place, The Rocks (1845). A typical 'bald-faced' early Sydney terrace.

==== Early Terraces ====
Early Europeans were housed in primitive dwellings of necessity, such as tents, and mud and wood slab cottages. Few examples survive, but a notable one is Elizabeth Farm Cottage, Parramatta (1793). Resources were scare in the fledgling colony and houses of brick and masonry were rare, so it was not until the 1820s that Underwoods Tenements – believed to be the first terrace – was built. Both Underwoods Tenements and the still-standing Coles Buildings, Millers Point (c. 1845-48) followed a subdued version of the Old Colonial Georgian vernacular, with windows arranged symmetrically and simple bald-faced facades lacking ornamentation. Susannah Place, The Rocks (1844) also has a chaste, simple facade. A former grocery store and residential terrace which housed domestic occupants until 1990, it is now a museum of working class history. Jobbins Buildings, The Rocks (c. 1855-1857) with its subtle breakfront and diminished central pediment aspires to a more tasteful Regency style, but its facade was still absent of the filigree verandahs that characterised later Victorian terraces. As the Regency style was embraced in the 1830s, the facades of terraces such as Horbury Terrace, Macquarie Street (c. 1836) were adorned with unroofed balconies decorated with airy, Regency-style ironwork imported from England. Another surviving example from the Regency period is 39–41 Lower Fort Street, Millers Point (c. 1834-42), designed by John Verge.

The passage of the Building Act 1837 enforced the raising of party walls above the roof-line, leading to projecting party walls (both above the roof and on the street-facade separating each dwelling) becoming one of the defining characteristics of Sydney-style terrace houses. One of the first terraces to be built under these new laws, the three-storey Lyons Terrace, Hyde Park (1840–41), was the first to feature a double storey verandah along its facade, decorated with cast iron railings. Lyons Terrace, with its double storey filigree screen, is considered to have ushered in the Victorian Filigree style, in which most of the terraces of Sydney, and the rest of Australia, were built. Terraces built in the Victorian Filigree style featured prominent verandahs decorated with intricately textured filigree screens made of timber and cast iron. Wrought iron was rarely used. These lacy filigree screens were at first simple; on Lyons Terrace only the balustrade was made from lacy cast iron, but the style eventually developed to include brackets, friezes, fringes, and sometimes even double-friezes. Elysium & Gadgecombe (c. 1887), a terrace pair in Leichhardt, features cast iron lacework from at least two separate foundries, including Corinthian verandah columns, lyrebird-inspired baluster panels, fan-motif brackets, and a double-frieze (one frieze incorporating a lily pattern and the other a grapevine pattern).

Sydney-style filigree ironwork is more adventurous and haphazard than the formal Melbourne-style, often showing the layers of development a buildings has experienced. Sometimes, the filigree verandah is tacked onto the facade of a building from an earlier period, such as when the single-storey verandah on Linsley Terrace, The Rocks (1830) was torn down around 1873 and replaced with a double-storey verandah. In some cases, ironwork from multiple eras co-exist on one house. Katoomba House, Millers Point (c. 1875) was a two-storey terrace when originally built, with a cast iron balcony railing featuring a pattern of overlapping circles. A third storey was added in c. 1886, with a different, clashing pattern on the third-level balcony. A defining feature of the Melbourne-style is its use of complete sets of matching ironwork, with baluster panels, brackets and friezes often using the same motifs in their design. As the Melbourne-style gained popularity across Australia in the 1880s, matching sets became common in Sydney, as can be seen at Hillview, Summer Hill (c. 1906), a Federation Filigree terrace with a complete set of balustrade, brackets, frieze, and frieze-fringe panels all based on a shield design. Despite this ascendancy, differing patterns were still common; for instance John Terrace, Alexandria (1894) shares the same shield-design balustrade as Hillview, but its frieze and brackets are of a different pattern.

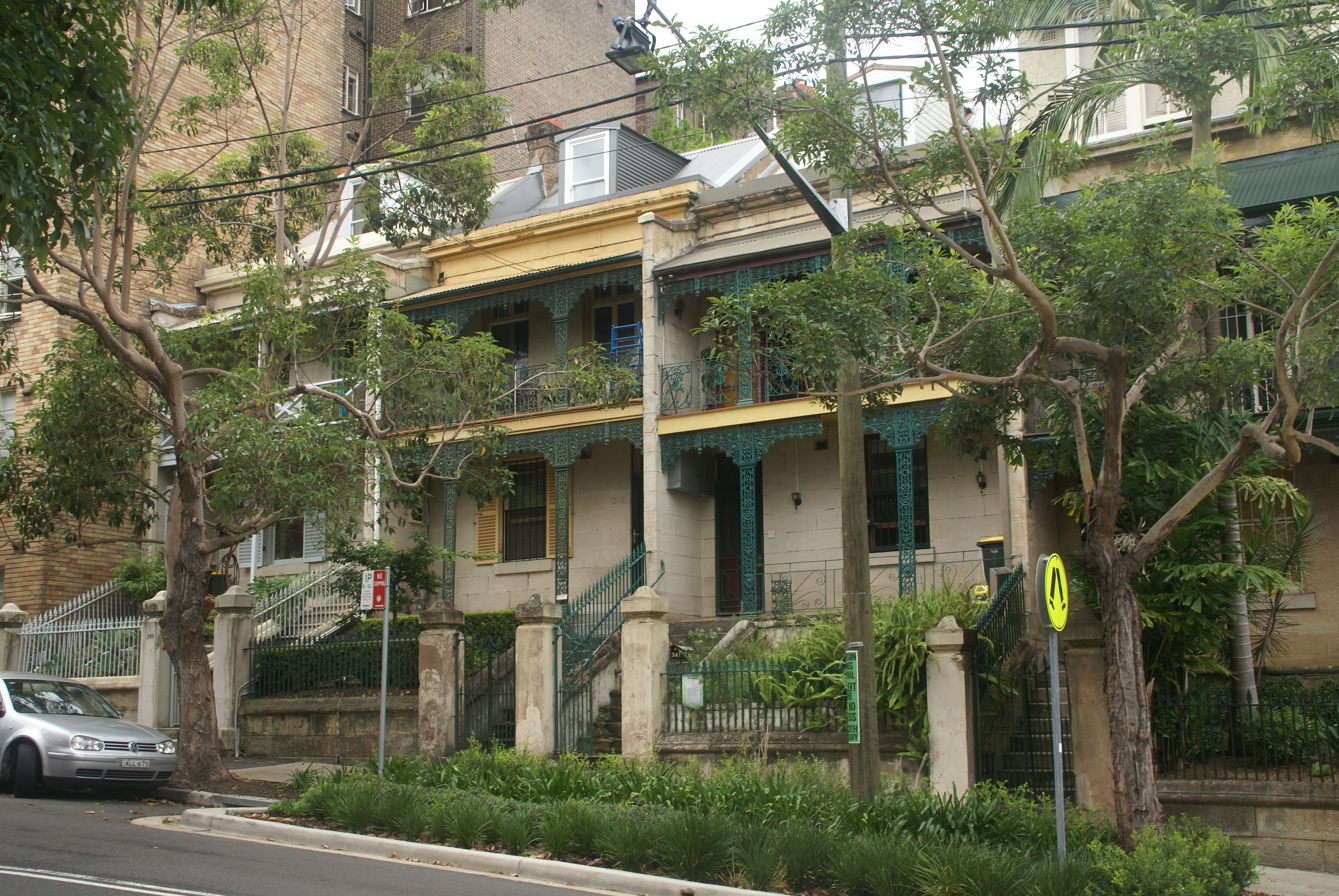
Sea View Terrace, Darlinghurst (c. 1855), featuring Sydney-style openwork columns. The ironwork was likely added in different stages, as the frieze pattern was not in use till the 1890s, roughly forty years after this terrace was built.

==== Openwork Columns ====
The most prominent distinguishment of the Sydney style of cast ironwork is the flat, openwork verandah column, also known as openwork pilasters. These flat filigree panels are common in New South Wales, but with the exception of Tasmania, are rare elsewhere. The double storey verandah of Linsley Terrace is supported by openwork columns from J. R. Bubb's Victoria Foundry, who also supplied the openwork columns that adorn the Doctor's House, Windsor (1836). At least eight Sydney-based foundries produced designs for cast iron openwork columns, many of which have not been seen anywhere else in the world. Sydney-based foundries producing openwork columns included: Bubb's Victoria Foundry; Brown & Brown; Dawson's Australian Foundry; G. Fletcher & Son; Jayfe & Son; Pope, Maher & Son; Taylor & Wearing; and J. Simpson's Foundry. R.T. Ball in Goulburn, NSW also cast openwork columns. Another notable distinguisher is the use of local Sydney sandstone as a construction material, rather than bricks covered with stucco.

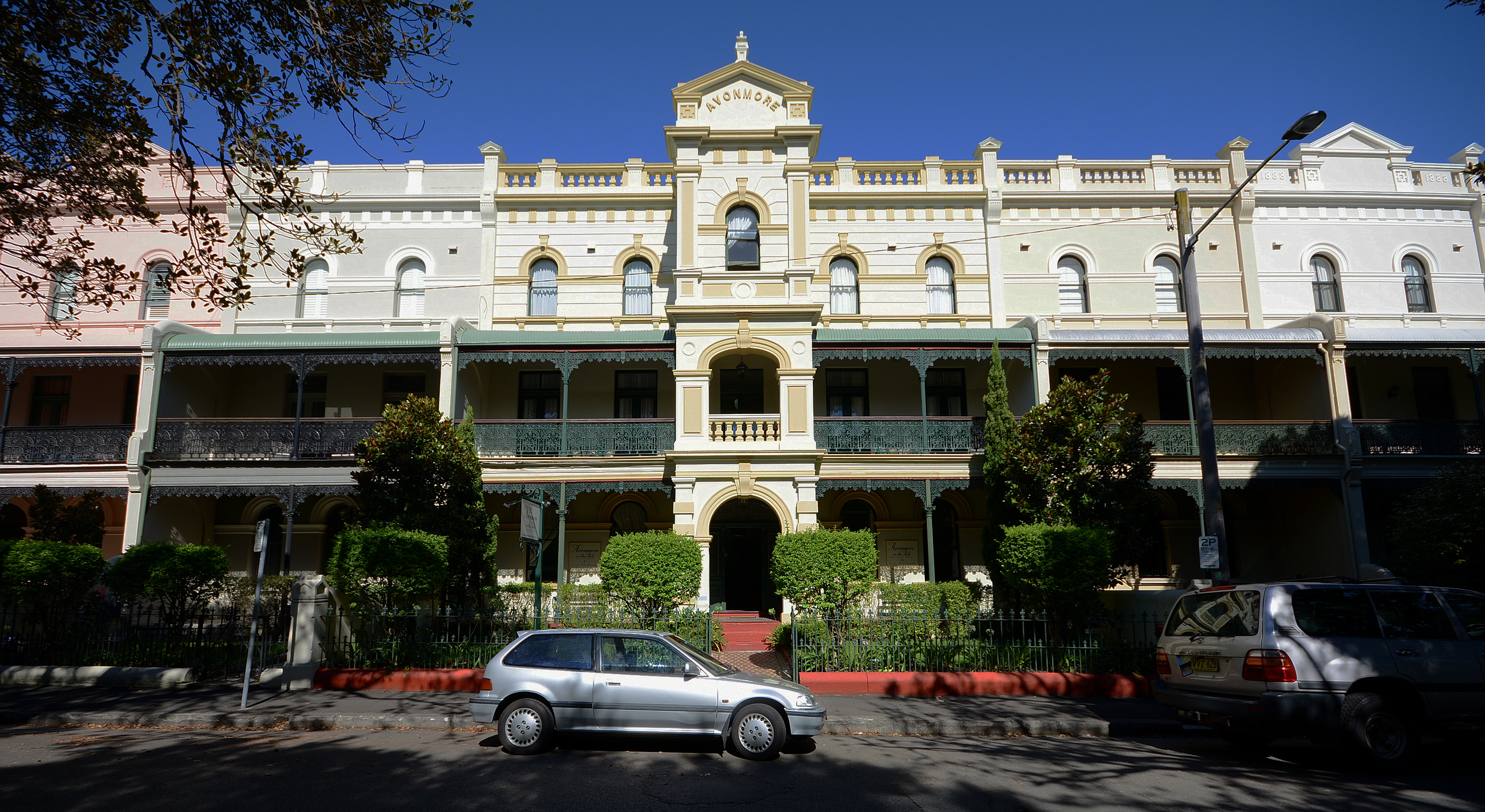
Avonmore Terrace, Randwick, (1891). Classical molding decorates a terrace that replicates the shape of the influential Lyons Terrace: three storeys with a double storey verandah.

Due to Sydney's higher density, most terraces tend to be taller than those found in other cities. Three-storey terrace rows are common, and it is not unusual to find terrace houses of up to four storeys, while some rare five-storey examples exist such as Hortonbridge Terrace, Potts Point (c. 1885-86). During the 1840s-1880s, the basic silhouette (three-storeys with a two-storey verandah) of the influential Lyons Terrace was copied repeatedly by terraces such as Carlton Terrace, Wynyard (c. 1864); Carlingford Terrace, Surry Hills (c. 1868-69); Young Street Terraces, Sydney (1875); Lawrenny Terrace, Surry Hills (c. 1882); Hughenden Terrace, Petersham (1884); and Herberto Terrace, Glebe (1885). Sometimes, all three levels were adorned with filigree screens, such as at Katoomba House, Millers Point (c.1885). The four-storey Milton Terrace, Millers Point (1880–1882) features three levels above ground, and a basement level below. Perhaps one of the finest terrace rows in Sydney is the four-storeyed Brent Terrace, Elizabeth Bay (c.1897). Praised for its "florid ornateness," this magnificent row of eight features three levels of matching of cast iron lace from the foundry of Dash & Wise.

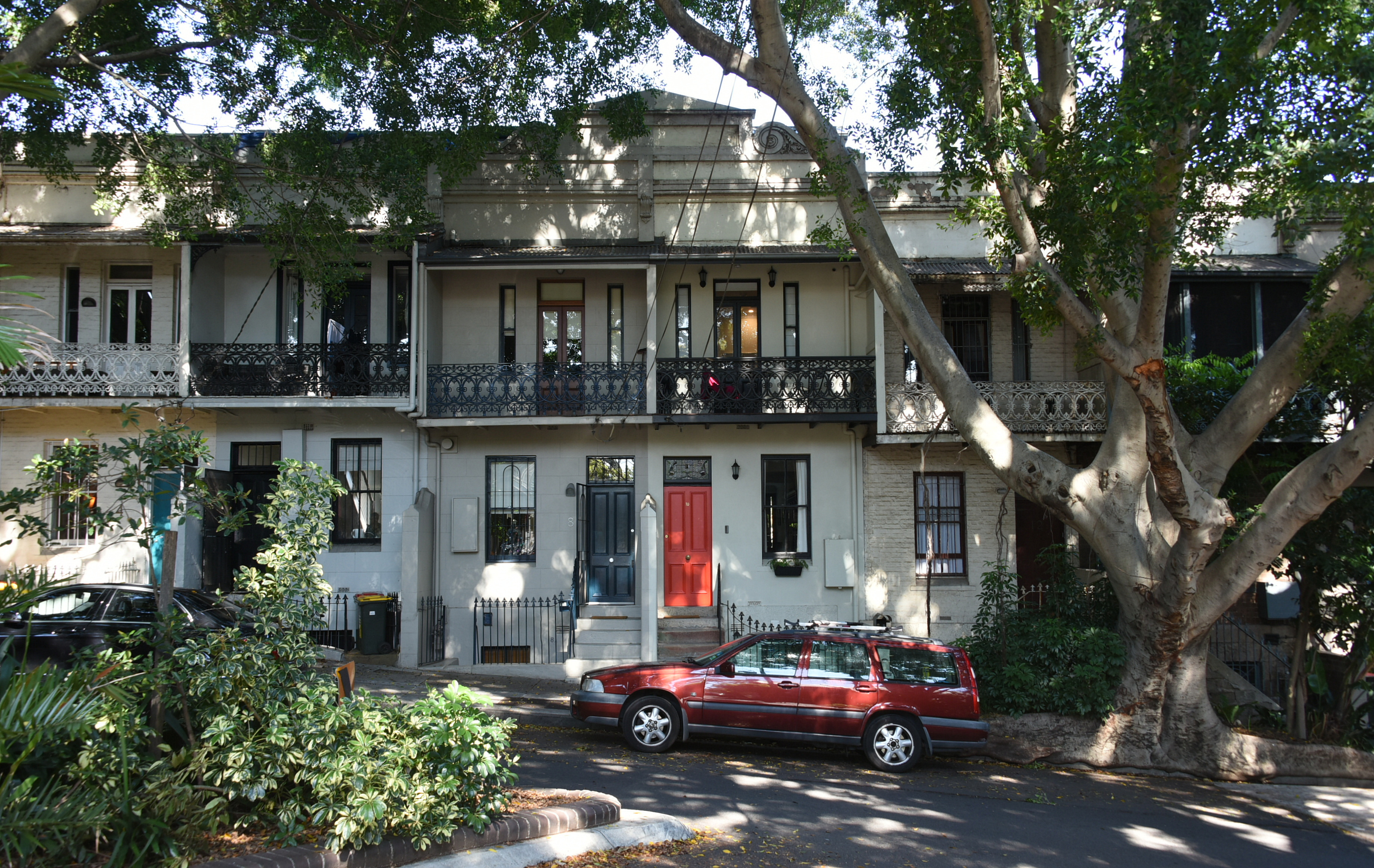
Terraces on Selwyn Street, Paddington featuring cantilevered balconies

==== Space-Saving Innovations ====
The space-saving attitude that lead to Sydney's taller terraces also encouraged other innovations, one of the most distinguishable being the cantilevered balcony, which allowed inner city terraces and corner shops to utilise the space above the public footpath. Sydney terraces were often built right up to the property line, and it is common to see cantilevered balconies jutting out over the pavement and into the public domain, such as on the now demolished Catherine Terrace, Darlinghurst (c. 1870), and on the still standing Gordon Terrace, Randwick (1885). Sometimes, the terrace was set back from the street line, and the cantilever balcony would hang over an area that was part of the property, such as on Westgate Terrace, Bondi Junction (1893). Often, cantilevered balconies were added to earlier buildings, showing the layered development of a booming city. By the 1870s, five of the seven houses that made up Hobury Terrace (c. 1836) had their unroofed balconettes replaced with wide, roofed cantilevered balconies. Frequently, semi-sunken basements receive sunlight through a light-well that separates the house from the street, as in common in London. Both Milton Terrace and Jessy Terrace, Newtown (c. 1891) have sunken light-wells bridged by walkways, edged with cast iron railings to ensure the occupants do not fall in. These complex filigree arrangements are decorative as well as practical. Another feature of the Sydney style is the 'concertina terrace' where terraces are staggered horizontally to conform to the curve of an unplanned Sydney street. Terraces can also be staggered vertically up a hill due to the undulating topography of the Sydney region. Cascade Street, Paddington features notable examples of these types of staggered terraces. Also common in New South Wales in comparison to other states is that terraces often lack a parapet and feature high-pitched roof with dormer windows and attics to make use of the roof space.

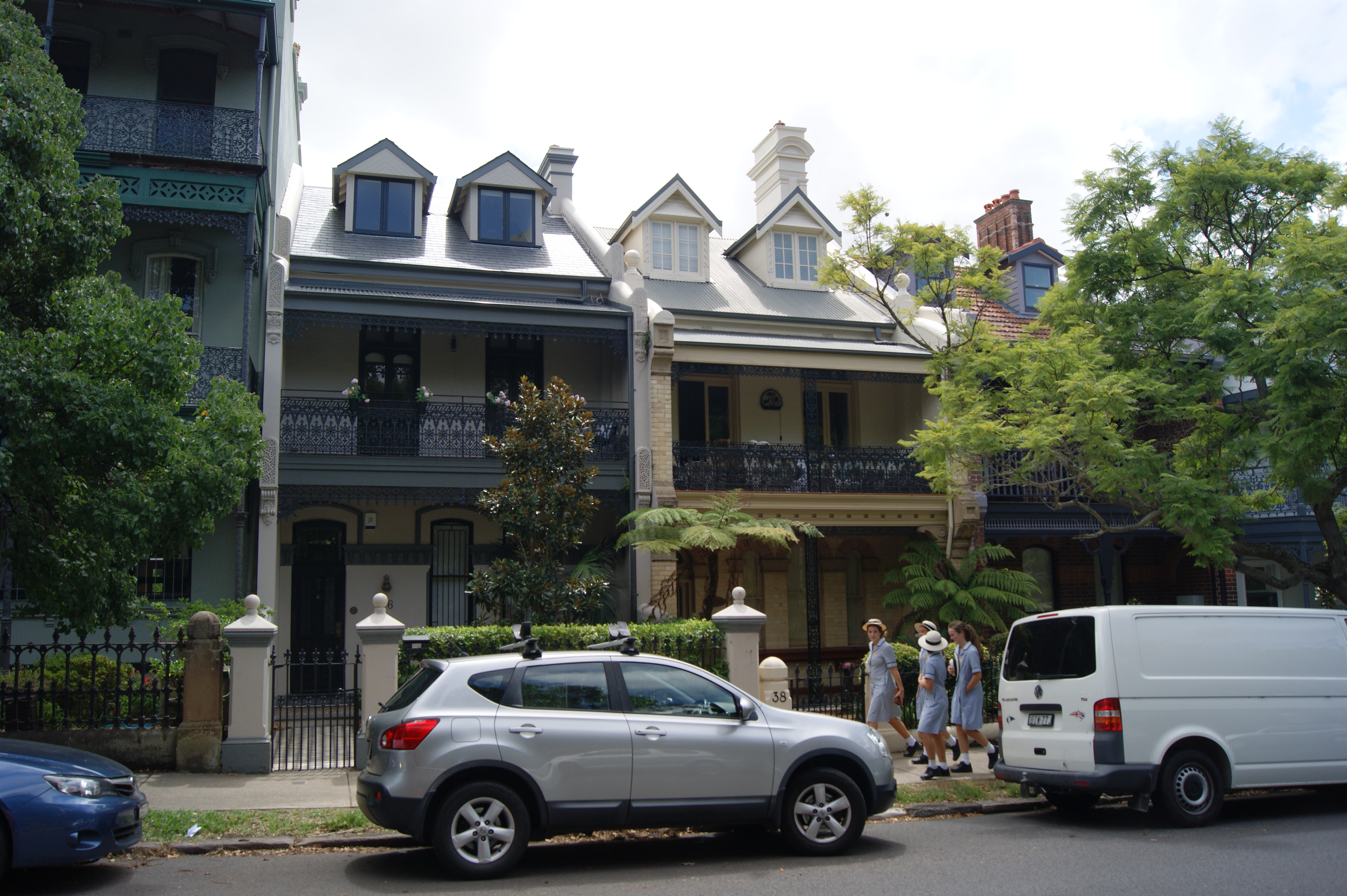
Dormer windows are common on terraces without parapets, such as these in Kirribilli

In contrast to the British practice of the day, under which dozens or even hundreds of houses were constructed by a developer as a single housing estate, Sydney practice was normally to build a short run of houses. Grosvenor Terrace, Waterloo (1881–1888) one of Sydney's longest intact rows, has 28 houses, while Lawson Street and Caroline Street in Redfern originally had rows of up to 39 houses when built, however examples like this are uncommon. It was common for the landlord or the builder of a terrace to live in the row once complete. In the suburb of Newtown in 1888, roughly 203 property owners lived in the same terrace or in the same street as their tenants. Ulster Terrace, Newtown (1877) was one such row; it was built by Peter Francis Hart in 1877, who retained ownership and resided with his family at the southern end of the row until about 1891.

Terraces in the Sydney-style were more likely to have pitched roofs that are visible from the street, with projecting party walls creating rhythmic streetscapes, as can be seen on Eagleton Terrace, Millers Point (1876–77). However, as Australia enjoyed a period of economic prosperity during the 1870s-80s, the Melbourne-style terrace house gained popularity across the rest of Australia, including in Sydney. These 'Boom Style' terraces were built in a highly embellished Italianate style often employing eclectic elements as diverse as Gothic gables and Romanesque arches. Matching sets of cast iron lace and Melbourne-style parapets became popular, as can be seen on the grand terraces surrounding Hollis Park, Newtown, and on Winsbury Terrace, Millers Point (c. 1875) Avonmore Terrace, Randwick (1888–91); and Corana & Hygeia, Randwick (1893–94).

=== Regional New South Wales ===
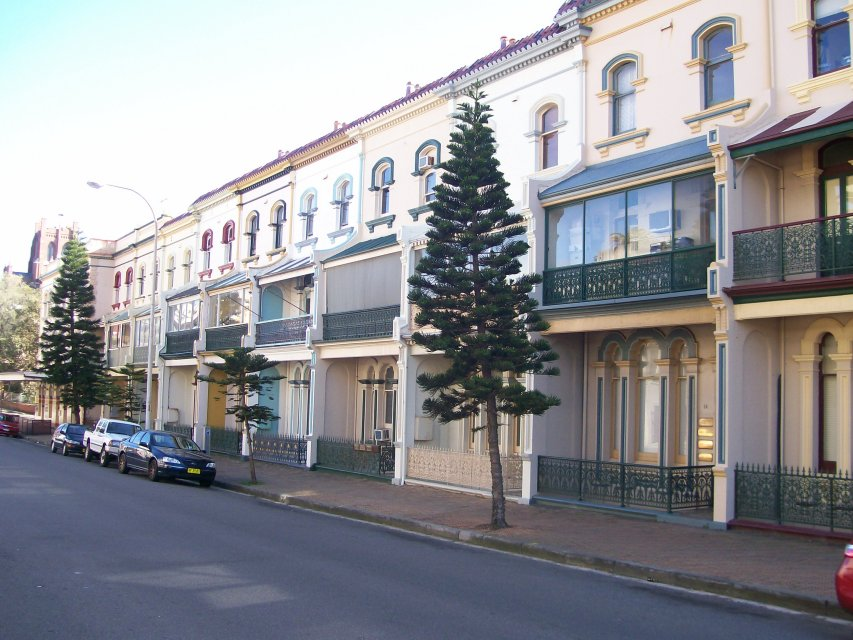
Buchanan's Terrace, Newcastle (c. 1890)

Outside of Sydney, Newcastle has an extensive collection of terrace houses, mostly in the Newcastle CBD, Newcastle East, The Hill, and Cooks Hill. Streets containing numerous examples of terrace housing include Wolfe Street, Tyrell Street, The Terrace, Bull Street, Watt Street, and Church Street upon which Buchanans Terrace (c. 1890) is situated. Newcastle has a large collection of Federation-era terrace houses, including a significant number of which are three-storeys with a basement level and light-well. Cantilevered balconies are common in Newcastle, and notable examples with cantilevered balconies include Pembridge Terrace (1900) and Belmont Terrace (1903). Campbell Street in Wollongong features the city's only heritage terraced houses.

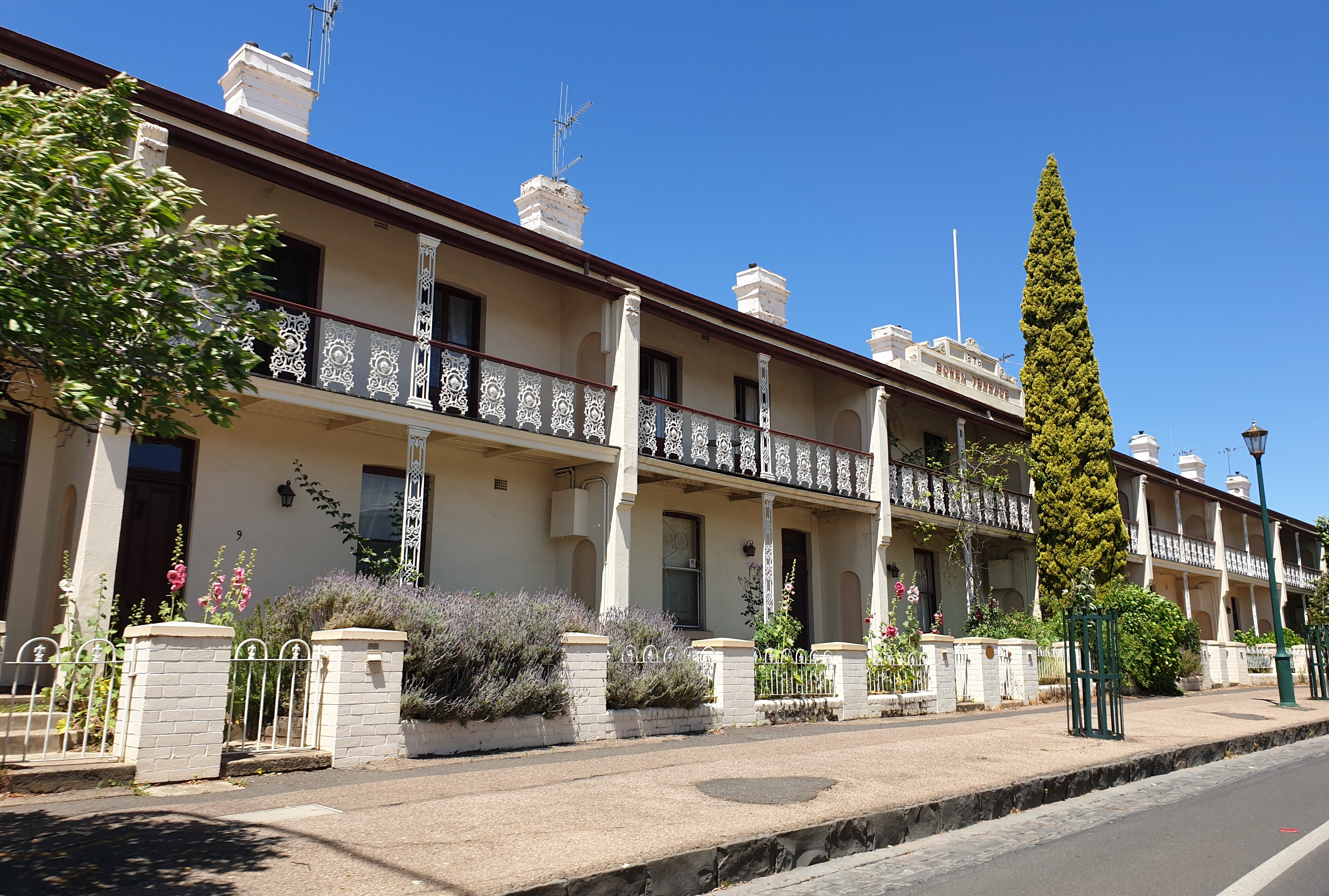
Bowen Terrace, Orange (1876) A row of twelve houses.

In the 18th century, little distinction was made between country and city housing, and thus it was the norm at the time for rows of attached houses to be built in both country towns and metropolitan areas. Cottages in the English understanding were just as often attached as they were freestanding.

The gold-mining town of Bathurst has numerous examples, including Cambria Terrace (built prior to 1882); Centennial Terrace (1888); Gladstone Terrace (1888); and an extremely rare group of 1850s attached cottages on Howick Street, notable in the Bathurst area for their age. Goulburn has many terraces, including a rare three-storey group on Sloane Street. There are examples of terrace housing on Darling Street in Dubbo, and in Bowral; Carcoar; Junee; Kiama; Lithgow; Maitland; Mudgee; Tenterfield; Wagga Wagga; and as far west as Wilcannia.

== Victoria ==
=== Melbourne ===
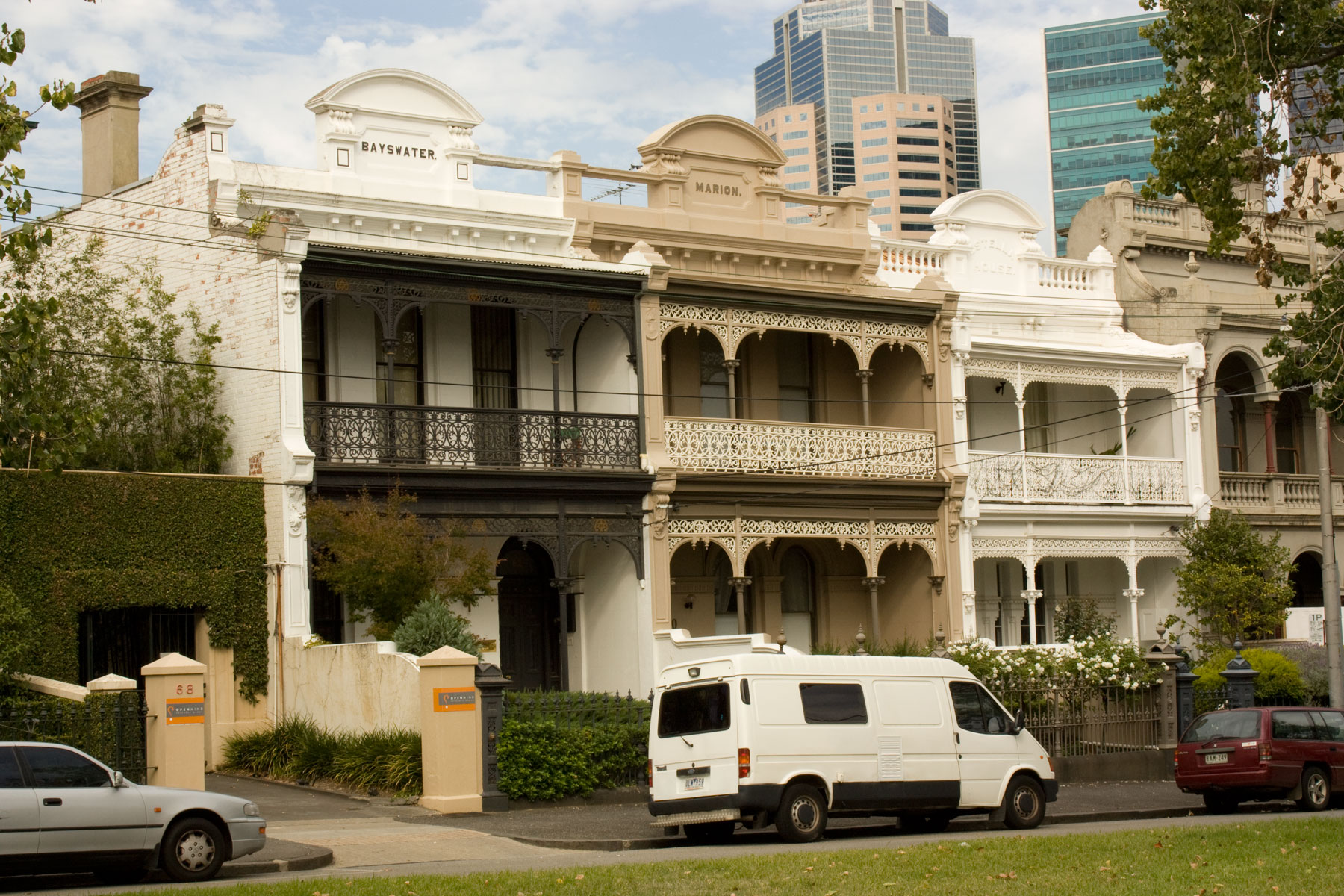
Terraces in Carlton, Victoria featuring the elaborate ornamentation which exemplifies the "Boom Style" of the late Victorian era.

Melbourne's flat terrain has produced regular terraced house patterns. The wealth of the gold rush fuelled speculative housing development and also ensured that many terraces were built with ornate and elaborate details in a generally Italianate style, reaching its zenith in the 1880s with what is often referred to as "boom" style.

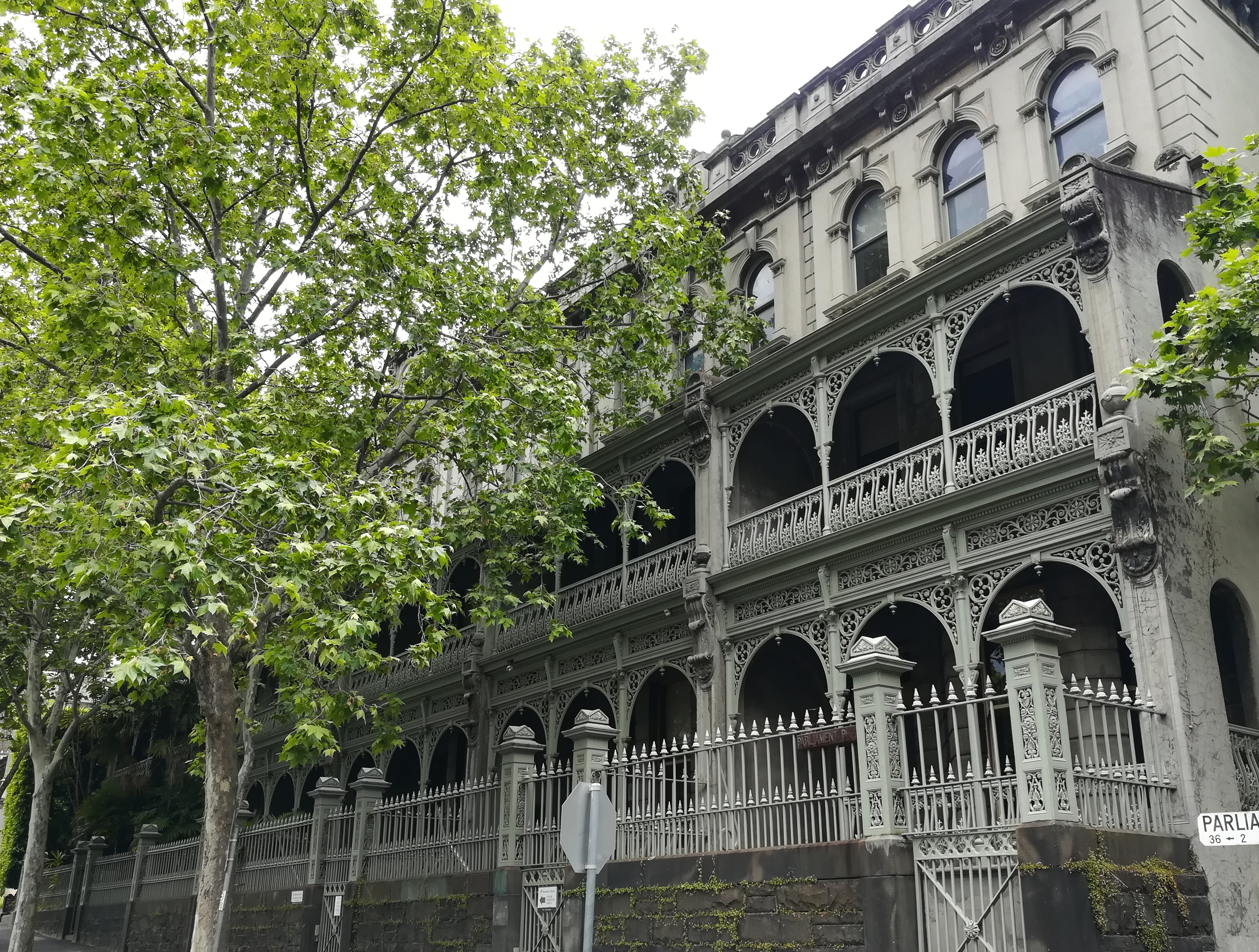
Tasma Terrace, East Melbourne (1879).

The generic Melbourne style of terrace is distinguishable from other regional variations. The majority of designers of Victorian terraces in Melbourne made a deliberate effort to hide roof elements with the use of a decorative parapet, often combined with the use balustrades above a subtle but clearly defined eave cornice and a frieze, which was either plain or decorated with a row of brackets (and sometimes additional patterned bas-relief). Chimneys were often tall, visible above the parapet and elaborately Italianate in style.

Individual terraces were designed to be appreciated on their own as much as part of a row. Symmetry was achieved through a central classical inspired pediment or similar architectural feature, balanced by a pair of architectural finial or urns on either side (though these details were subsequently removed on many terraces). The party walls were almost always decorated with corbels (which sometimes depicted heads), and the large wooden entry doors were decorated with stained or etched glass surrounds.

Many Melbourne terraces also featured a unique style of polychrome brickwork, influenced heavily by the early work of local architect Joseph Reed and often highly detailed (though in many terraces this distinctive feature has been later painted or rendered over, although some have since been sandblasted or stripped back).

The Melbourne style incorporated decorative cast iron balconies (of the filigree style). The demand for imported cast iron eventually led to the establishment of local foundries. As a result, Melbourne has more decorative cast iron than any other city in the world. Melbourne style terraces were often set back from the street rather than built to the property line, providing a small front yard. Decorative cast-iron fencing, regularly dispersed with rendered brick piers, was typically used, and the party wall of the end terraces would sometimes, but not always, extend to the property line to join the fence.

==== History of terraced housing in Melbourne ====
The earliest surviving terraced house in Melbourne is Glass Terrace, 72–74 Gertrude Street, Fitzroy (1853–54). Royal Terrace at 50–68 Nicholson Street, Fitzroy, completed three years later is only slightly younger and is the oldest surviving complete row.

Multi-storey terraced housing became prevalent in the Melbourne suburbs of Middle Park, Albert Park, East Melbourne, South Melbourne, Carlton, Collingwood, St Kilda, Balaclava, Richmond, South Yarra, Cremorne, North Melbourne, Fitzroy, Port Melbourne, West Melbourne, Footscray, Hawthorn, Abbotsford, Burnley, Brunswick, Parkville, Flemington, Kensington and Elsternwick. Free-standing terraces and single-storey terraces can be found elsewhere within 10 kilometres of the Melbourne central business district.

Terraced housing fell out of favour with Melbourne councils and after World War I some actually sought to ban them completely. The increase of slums in areas of terraced housing saw the Royal Victorian Institute of Architects in 1910 identify the problem as being caused by small inner city allotment sizes. The Housing and Slum Reclamation Act of 1920 shifted the responsibility for slum reclamation to local councils. The consequence was a shift toward larger block sizes and, inevitably, urban sprawl. During the 1920s, many terraced houses in Victoria were converted into flats.

Although Melbourne retains a large number of heritage registered terraces, many rows were substantially affected by widescale slum reclamation programs in favour of the Housing Commission of Victoria's high-rise public housing plans during the 1950s and 60s. Later private development of walk-up flats and in-fill development has further reduced the number of complete rows. However the 1960s saw a new trend of restoration as part of the gentrification of Melbourne's inner suburbs. As a result, streets and suburbs which contain large intact rows of terraced housing are now fairly rare. Suburbs such as Albert Park, Fitzroy, Carlton, Parkville and East Melbourne are now subject to strict heritage overlays to preserve what is left of these streetscapes.

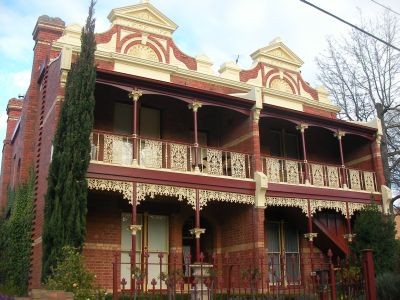
Lascelles Terrace, Ballarat (c. 1875). Regional Victorian terraces were often greatly influenced by the Melbourne style, as shown in this pair of terraces.

Some of the more notable examples of terraced housing in Melbourne include the heritage registered Tasma Terrace, Canterbury, Clarendon Terrace, Burlington Terrace, Cypress Terrace, Dorset Terrace, Nepean Terrace and Annerly Terrace (East Melbourne), Blanche Terrace, Cobden Terrace, Holyrood Terrace (Fitzroy), Rochester Terrace and the St Vincent Gardens precinct (Albert Park), Royal Terrace, Holcombe Terrace, Denver Terrace, Dalmeny House & Cramond House, and Benvenuta (Carlton), Marion Terrace (St Kilda) and Finn Barr (South Melbourne).

=== Regional Victoria ===
Outside of Melbourne, the larger cities of Ballarat, Bendigo and Geelong are home to a range of examples, from modest rows to impressive ones, though generally only in short runs. The smaller seaside resort town of Queenscliff has a number of late 19th century examples. The towns of Portland and Port Fairy, established early in Victoria's development, have a handful of plain, mainly single-storey, verandah-less early Victorian examples. Other early country towns occasionally have a single example of the same type.

== Queensland ==
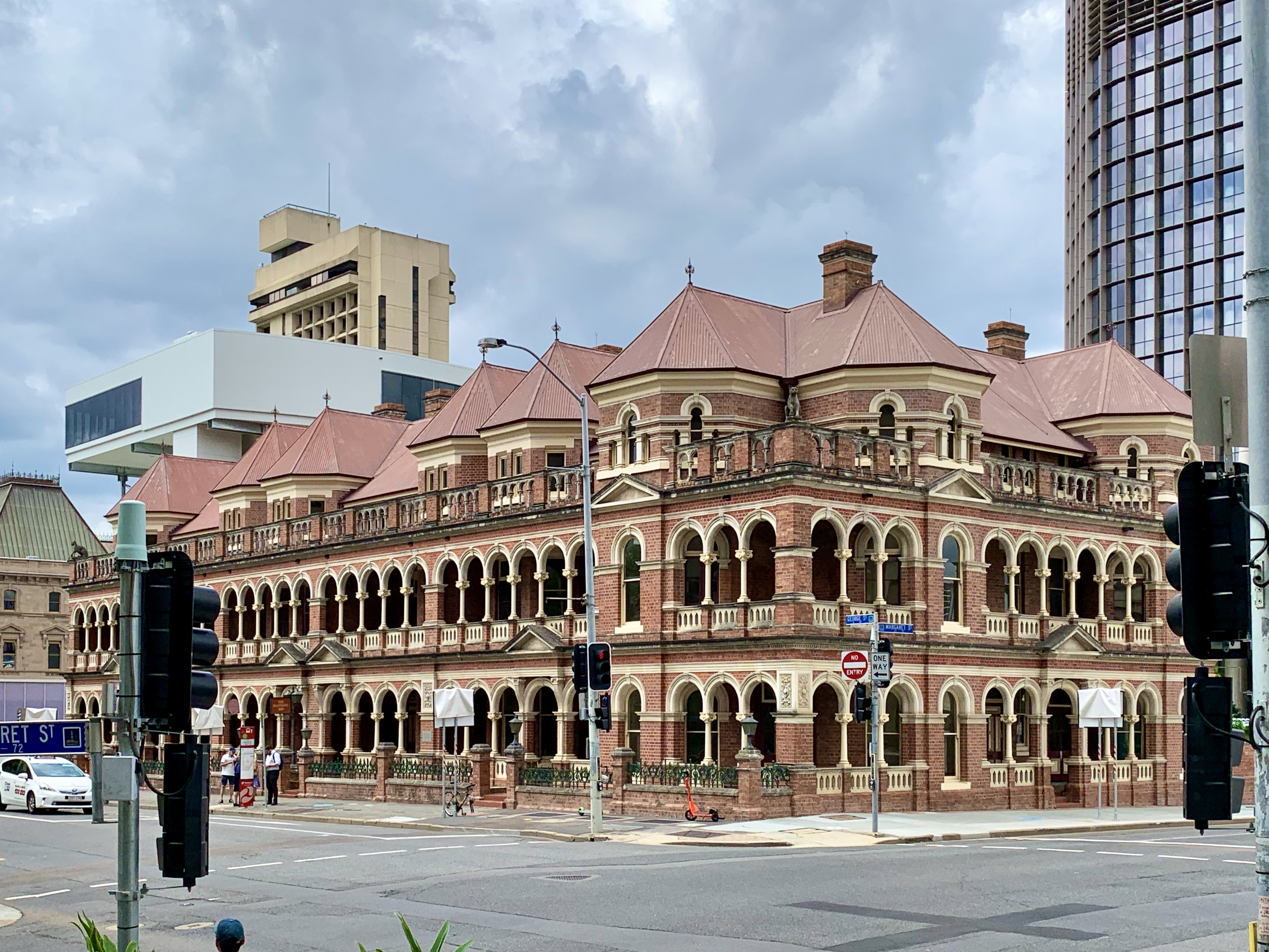
The Mansions, Brisbane CBD (1889). A row of six Victorian Romanesque terrace houses

=== Brisbane ===
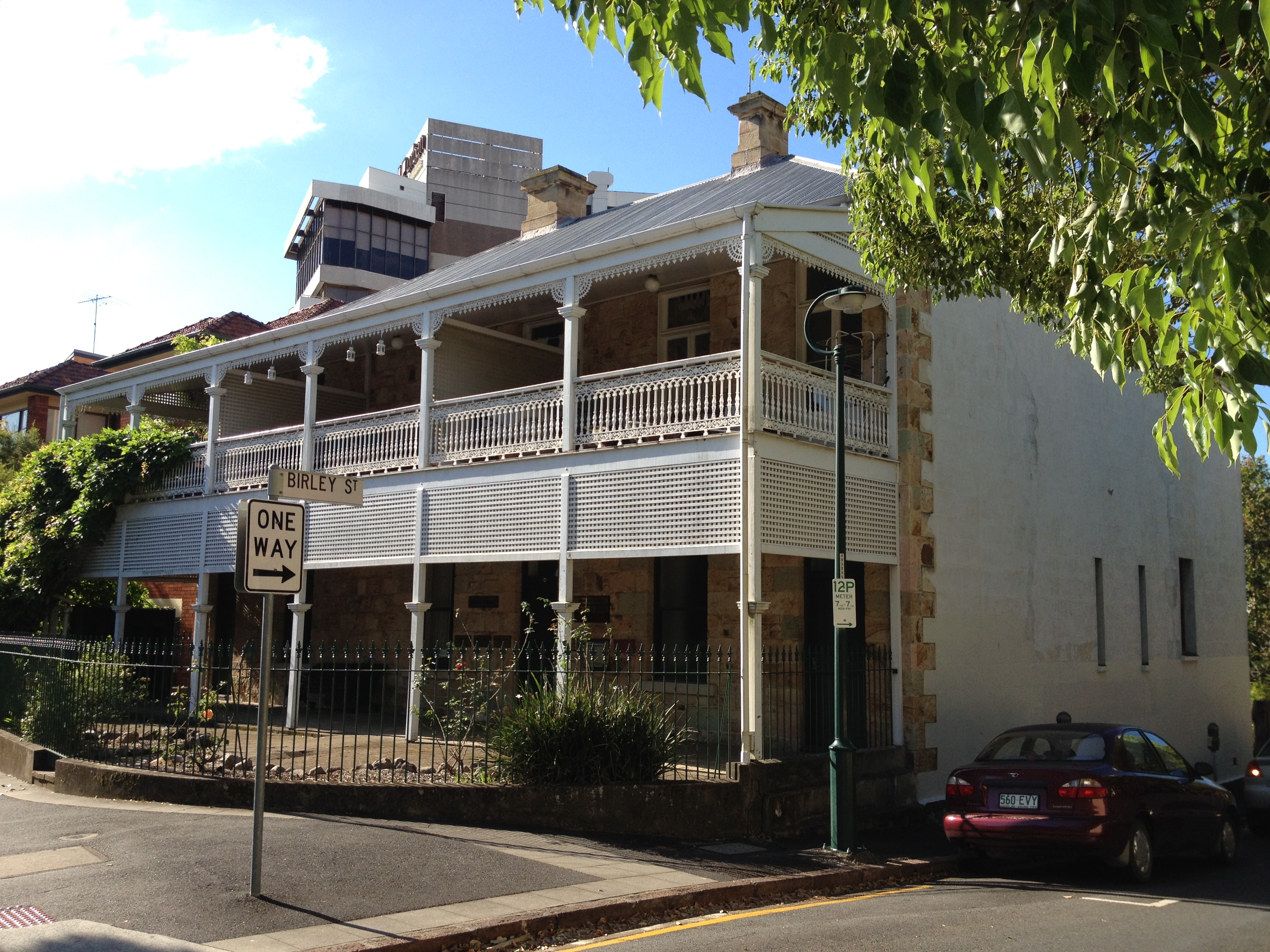
Athol Place, Spring Hill (early 1860s). The verandah displays a deep timber frieze, a hallmark of the Queensland style.

In Brisbane, Queensland, apart from government buildings, stone and attached buildings were deprecated, and in fact legislated against by the Undue Subdivision of Land Prevention Act 1885. Enacted as a public health and anti-slum measure, it set a minimum frontage of about 10 metres for each residential block, thus effectively ending the building of terraces, although a few terraces were built as a single rental project, were not subdivided, and managed to bypass the legislation.

Only a handful of examples remain, mostly clustered in the Central Business District. Notable examples include; Harris Terrace, Brisbane (1866–1867), O'Keefe's Buildings (1881) & Illawarra Buildings (1886–87), both on Petrie Terrace; The Mansions, Brisbane (1889); and Cook Terrace, Milton (1889). The houses on Edmonstone Street in West End are also of note.

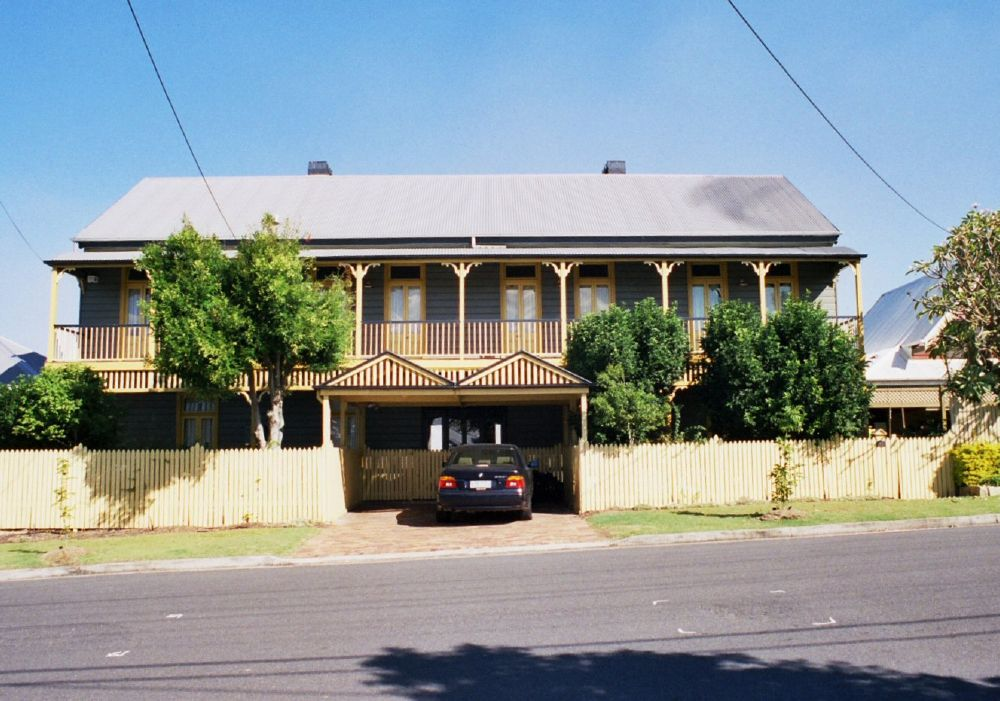
Cross Terrace, Red Hill (1887–1888), a terrace in the Queenslander style.

Nostalgic replicas became popular in Brisbane in the 1980s and 1990s in mock-Victorian style, in an attempt by developers to appeal to wealthy migrants from interstate. As a result, there are some quite convincing replica Sydney and Melbourne-style terraces along Gregory Terrace in Brisbane.

=== Regional Variations ===
There is a fair amount of regional variation present in Queensland terrace houses, with many of them incorporating elements of the Queenslander. In particular are prominent fretwork verandahs, and the high-pitched or hip roof, covered in corrugated galvanised iron. Illustrative examples include Goldsmiths Terrace, Spring Hill, (1888–89); Cross Terrace, Red Hill (1887–1888); and Watson Terrace, South Brisbane (c.1887), a row of four timber houses under one large hipped roof. The rear of the row displays strong connections to the Queenslander style. Due to the subtropical climate, the verandah is a prominent feature of Queensland terraces, and is often deeper than those in the southern states, in order to provide shade, privacy, and coolness.

== South Australia ==
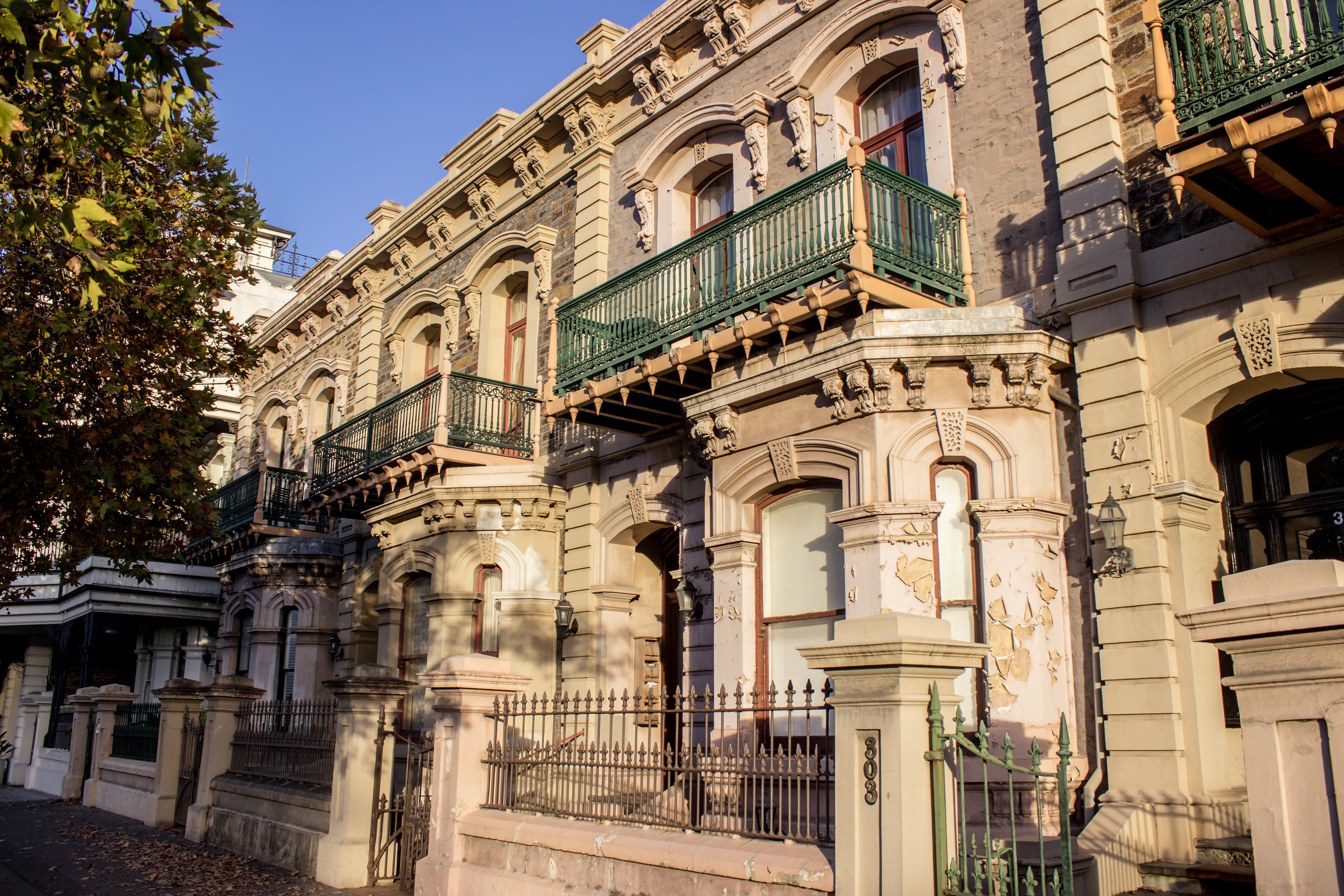
Botanic Chambers (1877) on North Terrace, Adelaide. The row was built in conjunction with the Botanic Hotel, and feature Adelaide-style unroofed balconies.

=== Adelaide ===
The city of Adelaide was founded in 1836 based on plans laid out by Colonel William Light. It is the only colony to have never received British convicts, and much of its early population increases came from migration, both through the government assisted passage scheme and through free migrants that paid their own fare. In the Victorian era, as terrace houses became a popular housing choice, South Australia's population had a distinct composition: it was a migrant society, with over two-thirds of the population born overseas, and a diverse one at that; for instance, almost 10 per cent of the colony were born in Germany. This composition goes some way to explaining the democratic advances made in the colony. In 1856, South Australia extended the vote to white male residents aged twenty-one years and over (First Nations Australians were not included), and became only the fourth place in the world to extend the vote to women in 1894.

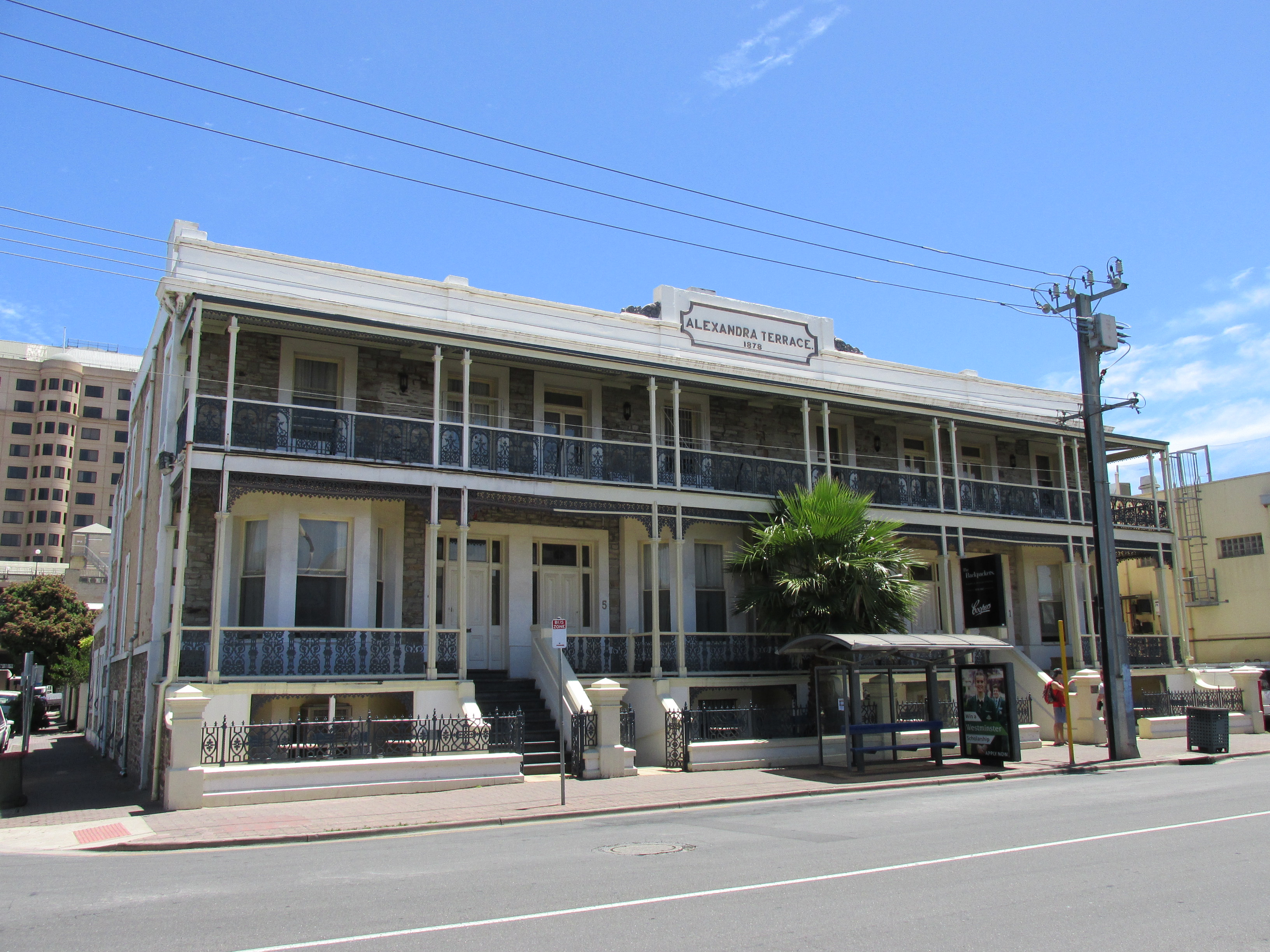
Alexandra Terrace, Glenelg (1878). As is typical of an Adelaide-style terrace, there are no dividing firewalls, and the four houses blend together.

South Australian architecture from the Victorian period never quite lost the Georgian ideals of symmetry, orderliness, and proportion. Dolphin Terrace, Adelaide (1884), a row of three houses on Archer Street show a remarkable deal of proportion and balance. The components, including the paired, keystoned windows and the projecting eaves are Italianate in fashion, but are arranged without the colossal asymmetry usually present in Italianate buildings. The 'Boom Style' exuberance of Victorian era Sydney and Melbourne, with their long rows of heavily ornamented terraces, was not echoed in South Australia. Terrace rows are generally shorter. Party walls are rarely apparent on the facade, and as a result, the divisions between the separate houses are not as clear. On Norwood Parade, a row of three houses blends seamlessly into each other, and upon first glance appear to resemble a large single house, not unlike Georgian terraces such as Cumberland Terrace, Regents Park (1826). The cast iron brackets on these three houses have been seen in the catalogue of Walter Macfarlane's Saracen Foundry in Glasgow, and were perhaps imported. An unusual example of the Melbourne-style is Albert Terrace, Adelaide (c.1880) which is one of the few South Australian terrace rows to feature a Melbourne-style parapet with name and date inscribed in stucco.

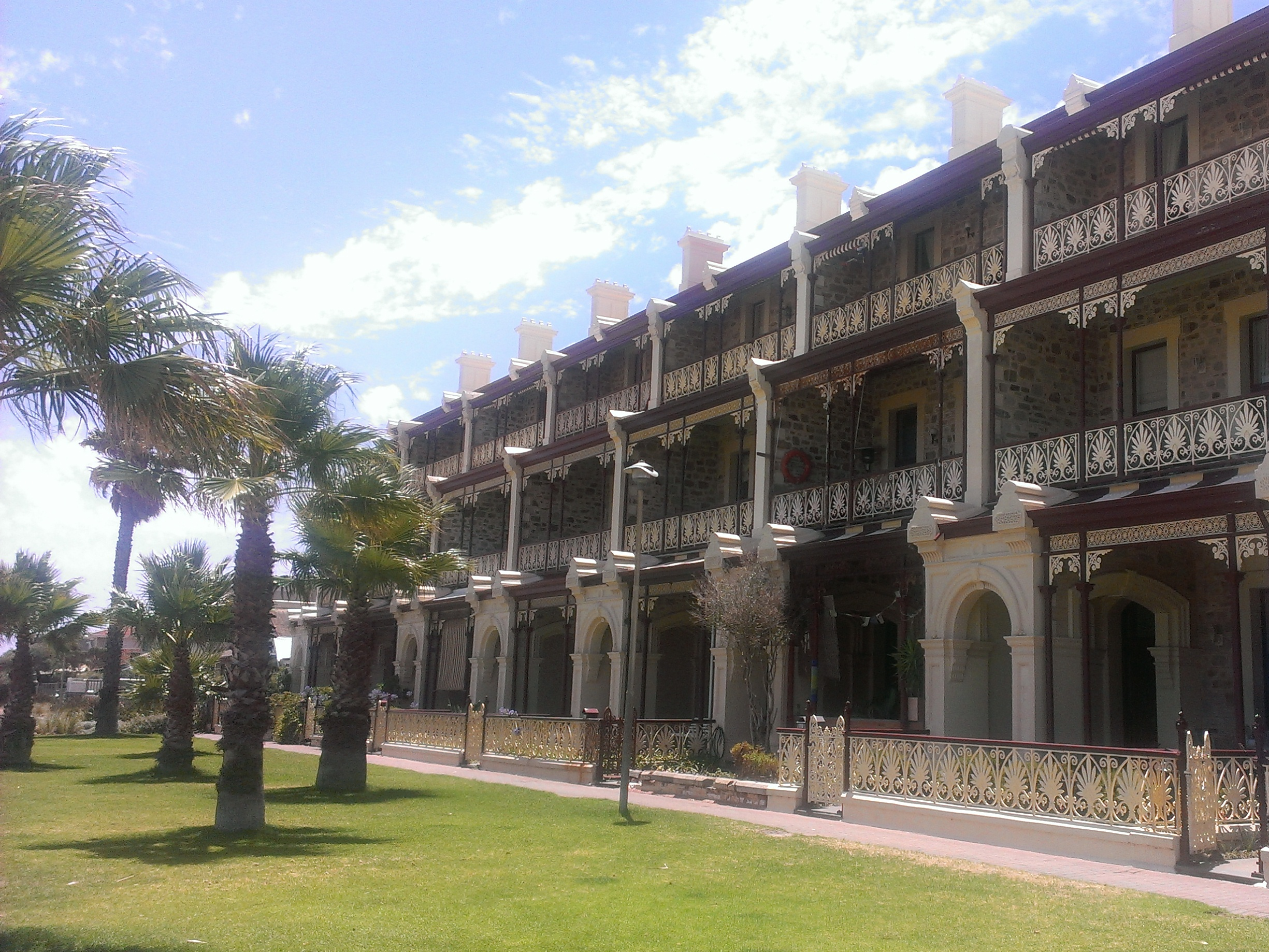
Marine Terraces, Grange Beach (1884). An exemplar of the Adelaide-style, with three storeys of setback filigree verandahs.

Adelaide-style ironwork is used with a lighter, more discreet touch than those found in other Australian cities. Unroofed, cantilever balconies are common, as are single-storey verandahs decorated with brackets and fringes, such as those on Dolphin Terrace. Verandah supports columns are often made out of wood, as at Dolphin Terrace, Darcy Lever Terrace (1878), and Böhm Terrace (1882). A defining feature of Adelaide architecture is the stepped-back balcony. This is achieved by recessing the balcony so that it sits back from the verandah. The Botanic Chambers, Adelaide (1877) is a row of seven Italianate houses that has the distinction of being of the few terrace rows in Australia built in conjunction with a pub, the Botanic Hotel (1877), both designed by the same architect, Michael McMullen. The Botanic Hotel features three levels of progressively stepped back balconies.

One of the finest terrace rows in Australia is the Marine Terraces, Grange Beach (1884), and are the only three-storey terraces ever built on Australia's coastline. They are built in the Adelaide-style, with progressively stepped back filigree screened facades. Some of the ironwork was imported from Scotland.

== Western Australia ==
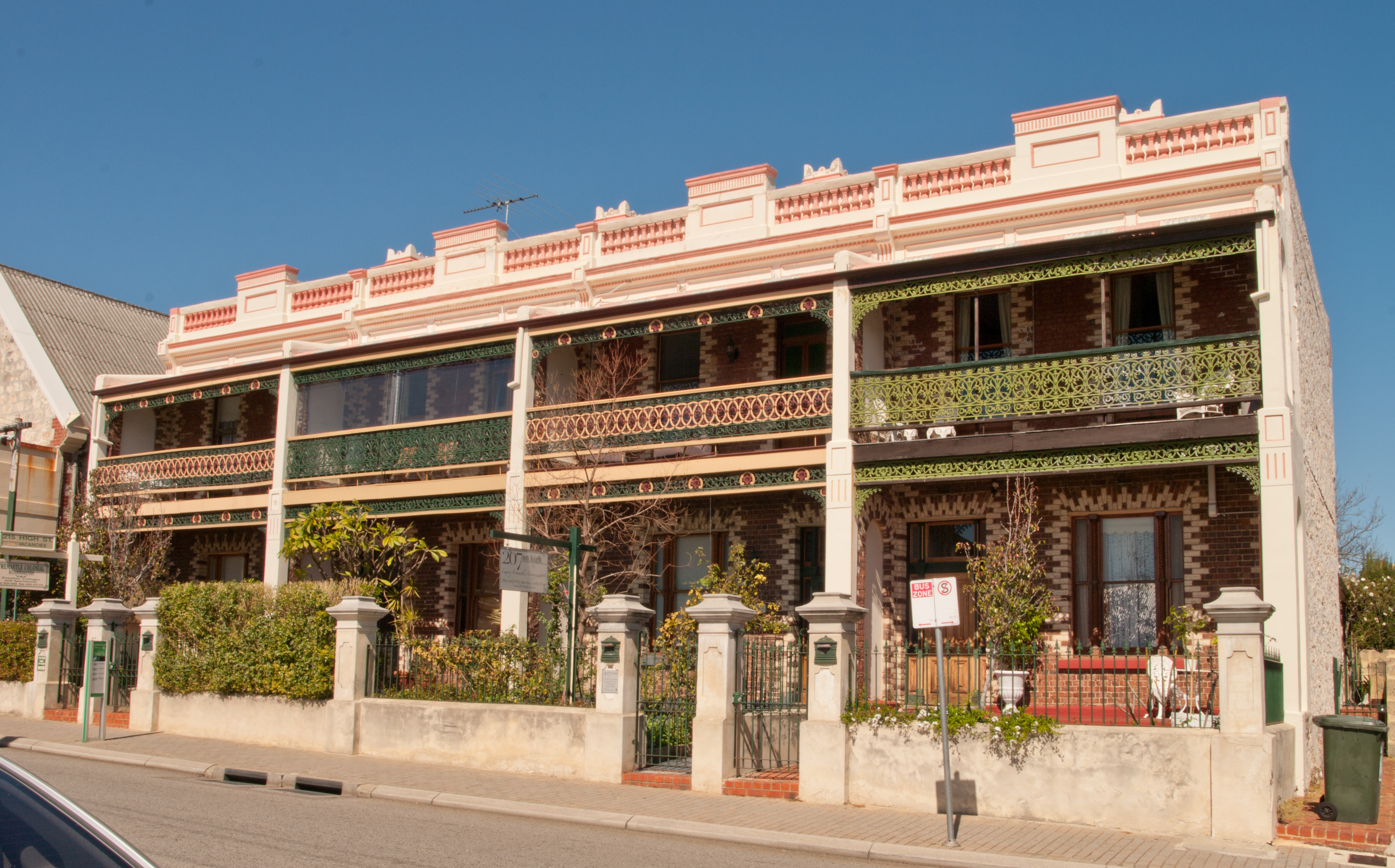
Ardmore terrace houses, Fremantle (c. 1898)

West Australian terraces were more likely to be called 'tenements' than 'terraces' and surviving examples are mostly found in the inner-city areas of Perth, and in older suburbs such as Subiaco and Fremantle. Despite being established before the eastern cities of Melbourne and Adelaide, the Swan River Colony grew slowly; in its first seventy-five years of existence, it only added just 625 settlers per year. As a consequence of this late development, the city's terraces are largely influenced by styles developed in the Eastern states.

While the rest of Australia experienced a period of economic depression in the 1890s, the West Australian gold rushes meant that the state boomed during this time, and Perth's population tripled within one decade - by 1901 it had reached 27,553. Relatively few terraces were built before this time, but the boom brought with it a flood of academically qualified architects well-versed in the building styles of the eastern states. Tenements built around this time had opulent Late-Victorian facades decorated with stucco and iron lace. A particularly notable example is a row of eight houses on Catherine Street, Subiaco, built in two stages in 1904 by Minnie and William Lloyd. Despite being ostensibly built in the era of red-brick Federation architecture, this row had all the hallmarks of a Victorian era terrace, including a high parapet bedecked with urns and a triangular pediment decorated with the emblem of Western Australia – the black swan.

It appears likely that much of the cast iron that decorated the facades of West Australian terraces was imported from eastern cities, particularly from Adelaide. The palmette pattern that appears on Minnie Lloyd's 1904 terraces in Catherine Street, Subiaco appears in the 1897 catalogue of the "Sun" Foundry in Adelaide. At Hillside, Albany (1886), a freestanding two-storey house built in the Victorian Filigree style, the cast iron columns bear the brand of Revel Adams & Co's Vulcan Foundry, Adelaide.

Terraces houses can be found in many pockets throughout Perth, including in Ellen Street, Point Street, and Holdsworth Street in Fremantle.

== Tasmania ==
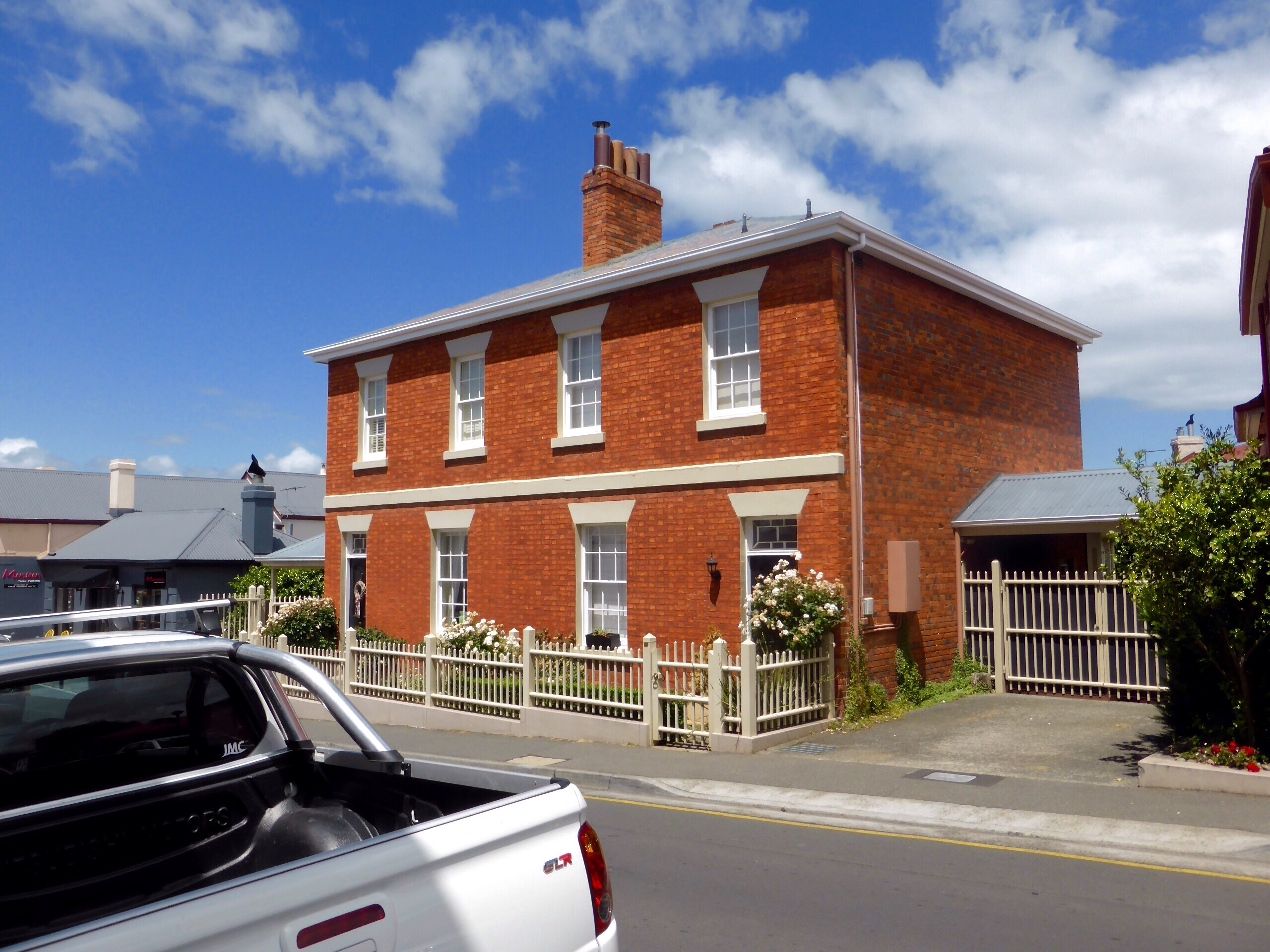
An example of an early Georgian-style terrace in Battery Point, Hobart.

Tasmania has a dual history of terrace house construction, possessing significant but separate collections of both Old Colonial Georgian style terraces, and newer Melbourne-style terraces built in the late-Victorian era.

Despite the relatively small size of its major cities in comparison with those on mainland Australia, Tasmania, being one of the oldest European settlements, has a number of examples of early terrace housing, particularly in inner Hobart. These early proto-terraces were attached cottages that shared a common roof, often resembling a single dwelling. Battery Point, Hobart contains many surviving examples of these humble attached cottages. One such example is Mr Watson's Cottages in Battery Point, a row of four attached red-brick cottages with trapeziod-shaped lintels and six-paned glass windows. Many of these early examples have much in common with New South Wales examples from the same period. Albion House, Launceston (c. 1835) displays the same rare cast iron pattern on its unroofed balcony as Horbury Terrace, Macquarie Street (c. 1836).

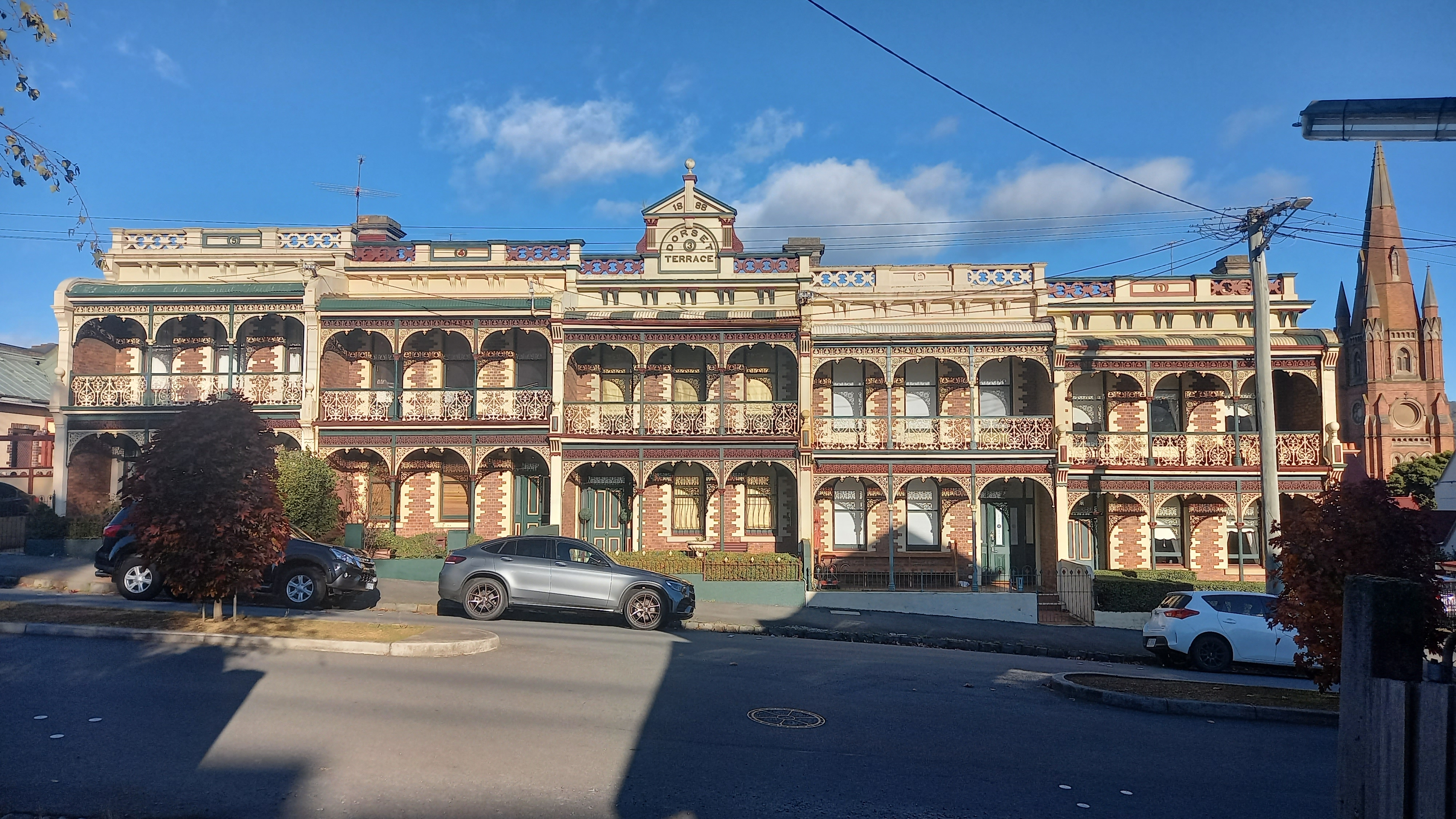
Dorset Terrace, Launceston (1888)

As Melbourne grew in size and importance, its architectural influence spread to other parts of the country. Northern Tasmania, being closer to Melbourne's centre of gravity, was touched by this influence more than Hobart, and so in places such as Launceston grand Melbourne-style terrace rows were built. They had were decorated with classic hallmarks of the Melbourne-style including high boom-style parapets and iron lacework that was cast in Melbourne, then imported to Tasmania. Significant Melbourne-style terraces in Launceston include Dorset Terrace, (1888); Wicker Terrace (c.1888); Alpha Terrace (late-1880s); Wellington Terrace (date unknown); and later, the grand Federation-era pair Esk View Terrace & Middlesex Terrace (c. 1905).

== Commercial Usages ==
Generally, terrace rows were residential in character, however many also served commercial purposes. In Victorian and Federation-era Australia, there was great demand for housing that was close to transport and commercial centres, and rows of shop-residences were often built along main, arterial roads in order to achieve this. These shop-residences, or shop-terraces, were often built in a continuous row with uniform styling and colouring, similar to residential terraces. On shop-terraces the ground-floor was used for commercial purposes such as shop or workshop, while the upper-floor was often used for residential purposes. The shop-residence became so common, it became the dominant form of retail establishment. In Newtown in 1892, 413 shop-residences are recorded, but only 20 buildings served solely as shops with no residential usage.

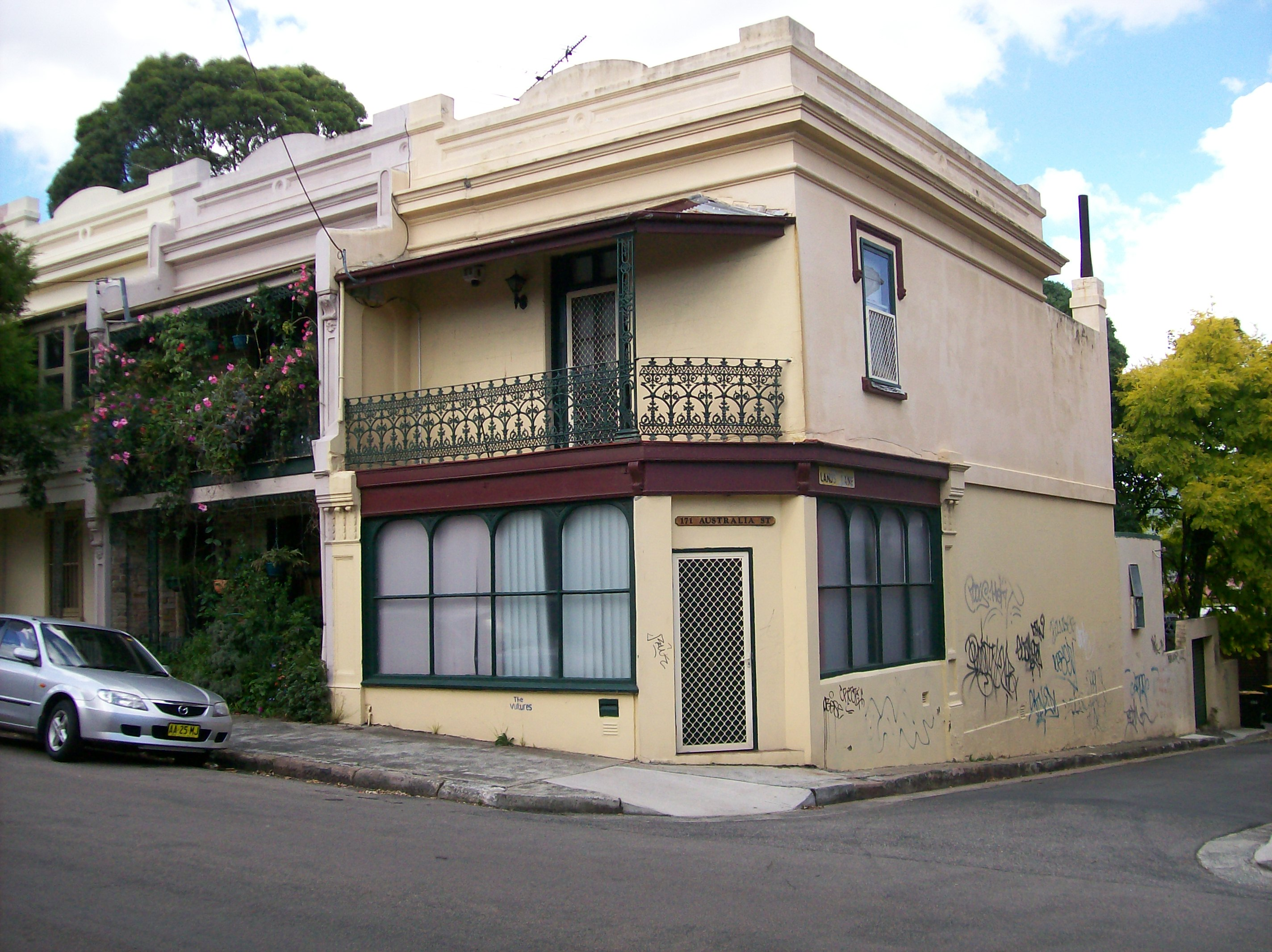
The corner-shop of Tuft's Terrace, Newtown (c.1879).

In Sydney it was particularly common for terraces in residential areas to have a corner shop built at the end of a row, often with a cantilever, wrap-around balcony overhanging the pavement. A corner shop is situated at one end of Tuft's Terrace, Newtown (c. 1879), a row of eight built for Thomas Tuft, who himself owned and lived in a brick shop-residence on King Street. All eight houses sport double-storey verandahs with Sydney-style openwork columns, separated by party walls. Early tenants of the corner-shop included grocers, fruiterers, and James Raymond, a butcher who occupied the premises from c. 1881-c. 1891.

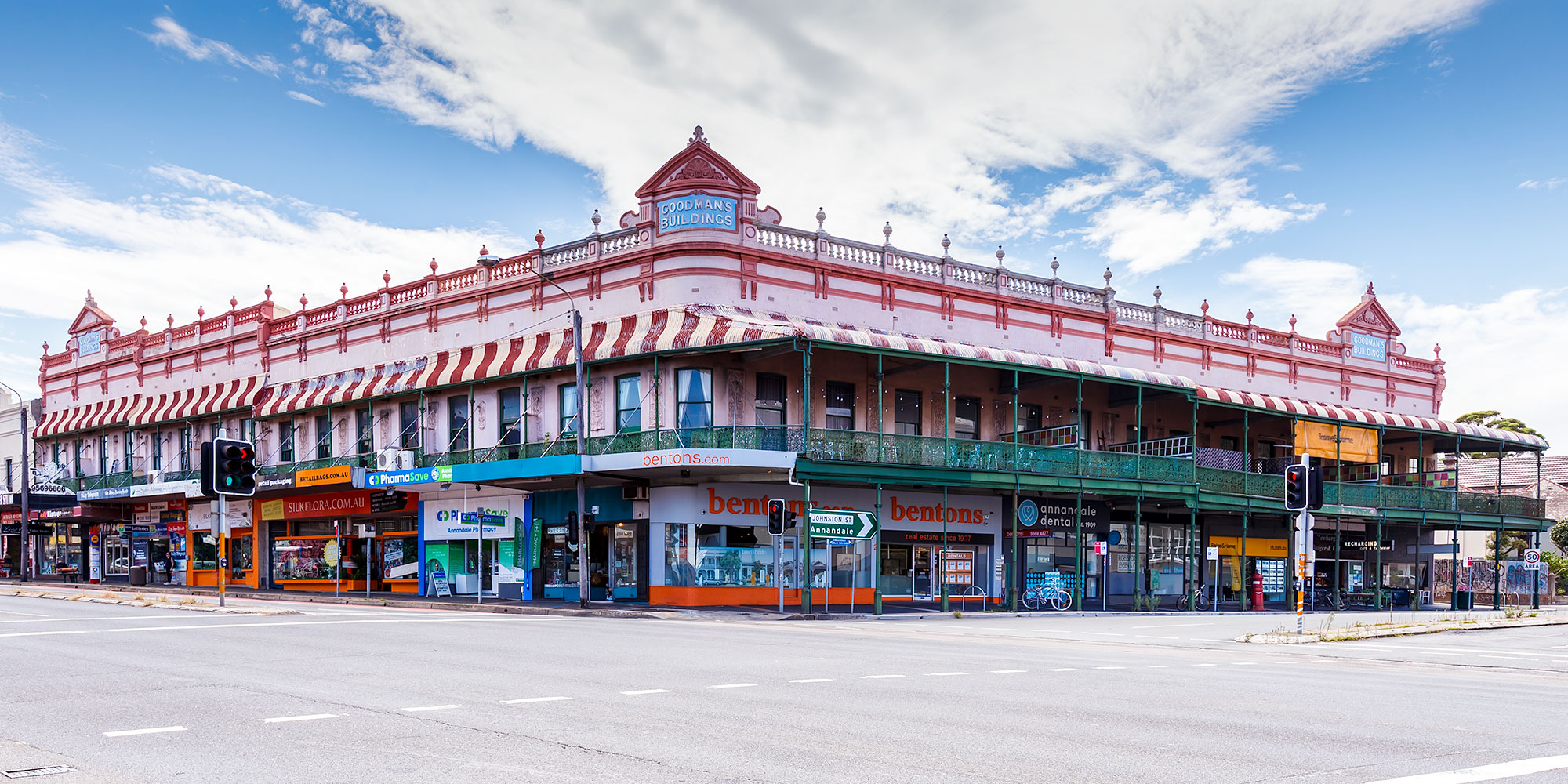
Goodman's Buildings, Annandale. Built in stages between 1890 and 1912.

In the Victorian era, one of the most common architectural styles in which these shop-terraces were built was the Victorian Filigree style, however as this style went out of fashion, the filigree verandahs and balconies were sheared off, depriving the buildings of the visually dominant element that transformed their facades and often leaving behind styleless, unembellished facades. One of the more notable shop-terraces which have retained its filigree verandah is Goodman's Buildings, Annandale (1893–1912). Designed by architects Sheerin & Hennessy it was built in stages between 1893 and 1912 for Walter Goodman, a local shoe merchant and entrepreneur. The building is home to thirteen separate shops with residences above including a grand apartment on the first floor occupied by Goodman. The row was subject to restoration works co-ordinated by the NSW Department of Planning in the late 80s which saw the restoration of the verandah and the repainting of the building in the original heritage colours.

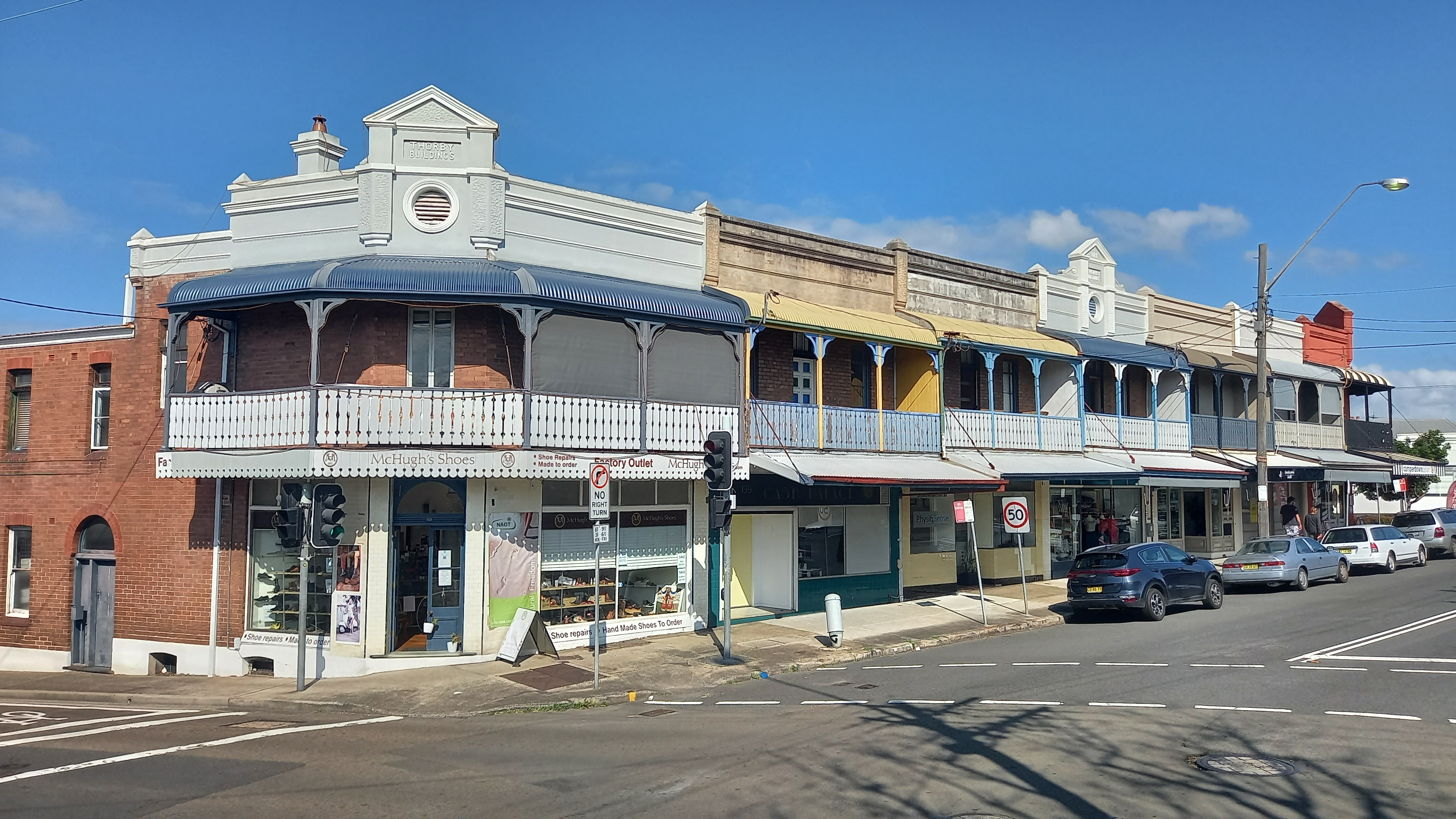
Thorby Buildings, Leichhardt (1912); a Federation Filigree shop-terrace.

Thorby Buildings, Leichhardt (1912) is a largely intact row of shop-residences built in the Federation Filigree style, although it has undergone various alterations, including the rendering of facades and the addition of corrugated iron cantilevered awnings. Its facade is decorated with a filigree screen of timber fretwork brackets and balustrading and, unusual for a Federation-era terrace, the balconies are cantilevered. Thorby Buildings retain original usages, with the ground floors still housing commercial premises and the upper floors still housing residential units.

Terraces rows often served mixed-use purposes, combining residential with commercial usages within the one row. One of the most common combinations was the placement of a corner shop-residence at the ends of a stretch of terraces, as can be seen in Susannah Place (1844); Tunneyfall Terrace, Marrickville (1885); and John Terrace, Alexandria (1890). Sometimes, terraces were built in conjunction with a pub; Narara Terrace, St Peters (1890–1895) was built in conjunction with the original Town And Country Hotel, while the Botanic Chambers, Adelaide (1877), was built in conjunction with the Botanic Hotel.

== Styles ==
Most terrace houses were built in the Australian Filigree style, which is generally split into two eras: Victorian Filigree and Federation Filigree. While these styles dominated, terrace houses were also built in other styles.

=== Old Colonial Era (1788 – c. 1840) ===
==== Old Colonial Regency ====
Earlier European buildings in Australia were built in a primitive Georgian vernacular style using whatever scarce materials were available. As European-Australian's entered a period of more relaxed prosperity, attention could be turned to aesthetics, and this coincided with the development of Regency architecture in England. Regency architecture emphasised elegance, orderliness, subtlety, and delicacy. Some of the most eminent examples of the style were terrace rows built by leading architects such as John Nash, and it is no surprise that Australians sought to emulate these examples. Horbury Terrace, Macquarie Street (c. 1836) reproduces many of the components associated with the English Regency style, including a stucco-rendered facade painted in white; a subtle cornice at the parapet; symmetrically placed eight-pane windows; and uncovered, cast-iron balconettes. Of these features, the balconettes are among the most significant, representing perhaps one of the oldest usages of ornamental cast iron in Australia. The Regency period featured an explosion of the usage of cast iron in England, and its usage in Australia in the 1830s was a forerunner to the Victorian Filigree style. A pair of townhouses (c. 1834-42) designed by John Verge display unroofed, cantilevered balconies projecting out from their street-facing facades.

=== Victorian Era (c. 1840 – c. 1890) ===
==== Victorian Regency ====
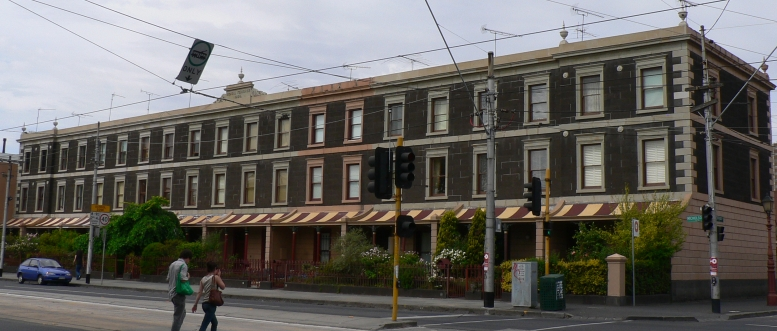
Royal Terrace, Fitzroy (1854).

A continuation of the Old Colonial Regency style into the Victorian era (c.1840 – c.1890). The economic prosperity of the 1830s came to a sudden stop when the wool boom ended in the depression of 1842–43, which effectively halted building activity for many years and left a gap in the architectural record. This depression, coupled with the introduction in New South Wales of the Building Act 1837, mark the end of the Old Colonial period and the beginning of the Victorian period. The Building Act 1837 sought to prevent fire damage by legislating the introduction of raised firewalls, parapets, and close eaves which act as significant markers of Regency-style terraces built in the Victorian era.

One of the most notable Victorian Regency terrace rows – Royal Terrace, Fitzroy (1854) – was erected at the height of Melbourne's gold rush. Built from Melbourne bluestone, the three-storeyed terrace displays Regency sensibilities in its parapet; in the orderly spacing of its windows; and in the striped, sweeping verandah roofs that are designed to mimic the sag of canvas awnings - speaking to a romantic Regency sensibility for the exotic and the tropical. A row of three Victorian Regency terraces in Millers Point (built c. 1857) are rusticated on the ground floor, with other Regency elements consisting of portico, bracketed lintel mouldings above the doors and windows, and a projecting cornice.

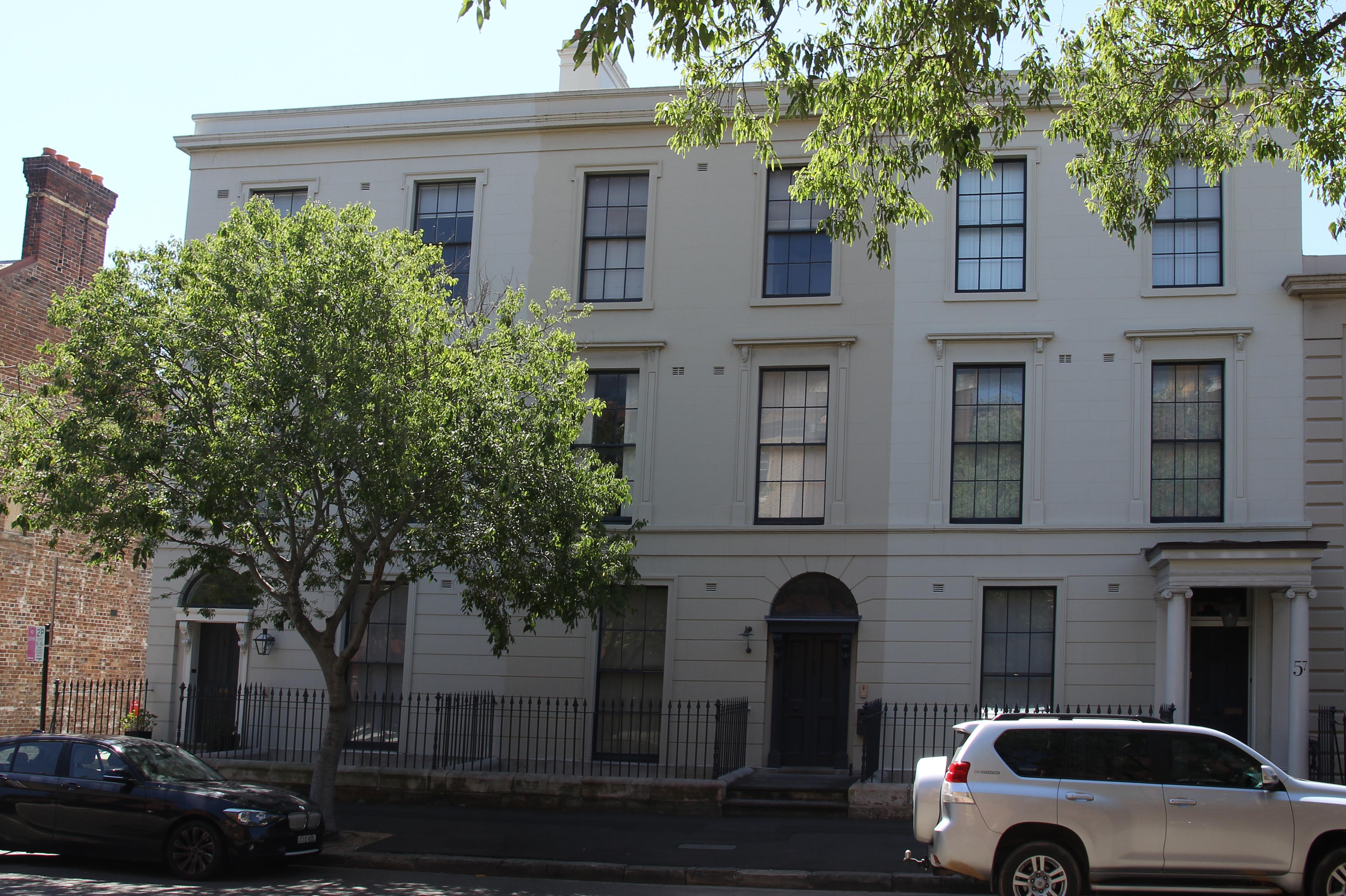
Victorian Regency terrace in Millers Point (c. 1857).

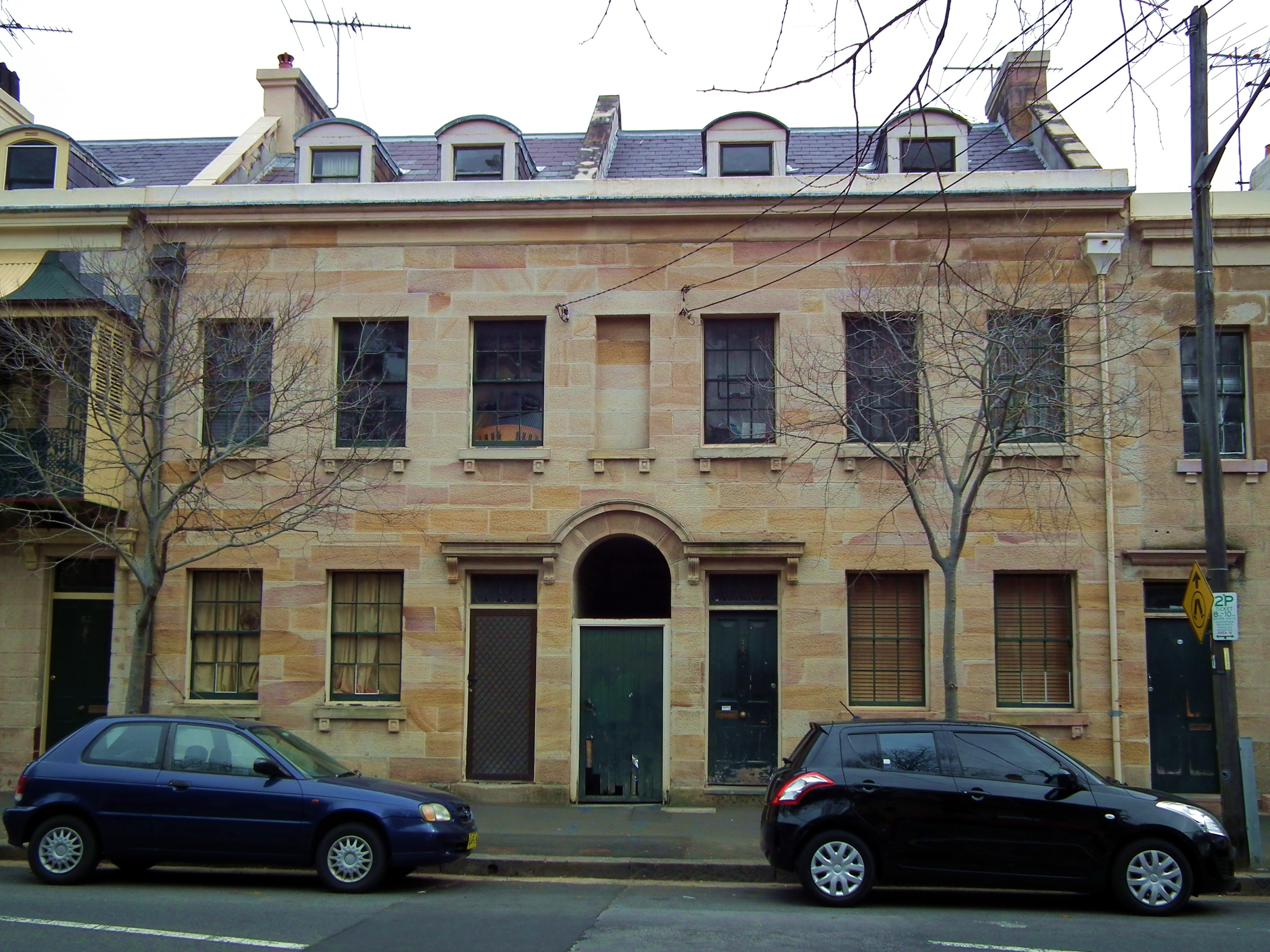
Regency style pair, Millers Point (c. 1855-1862)

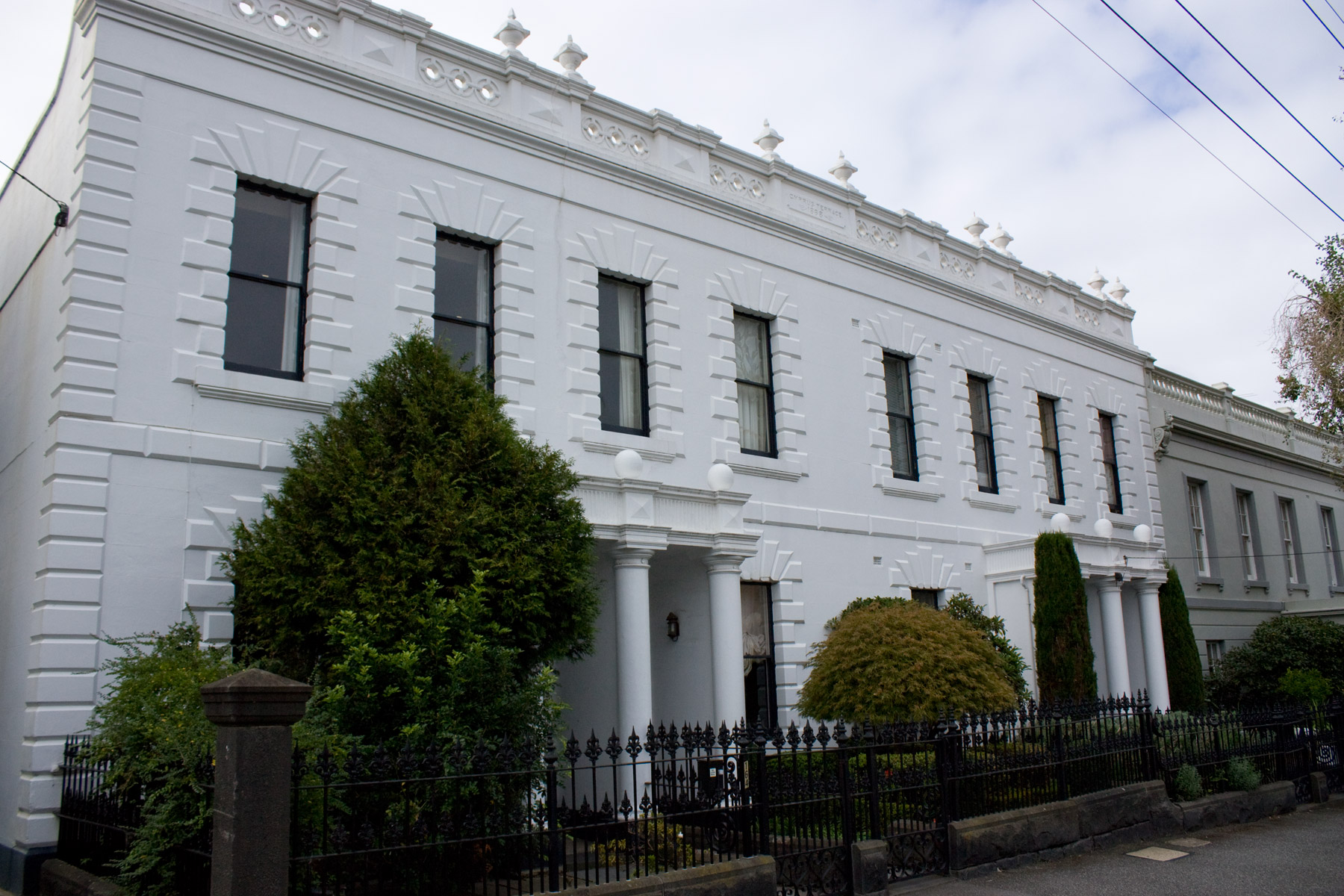
Cyprus Terrace, East Melbourne (1868).

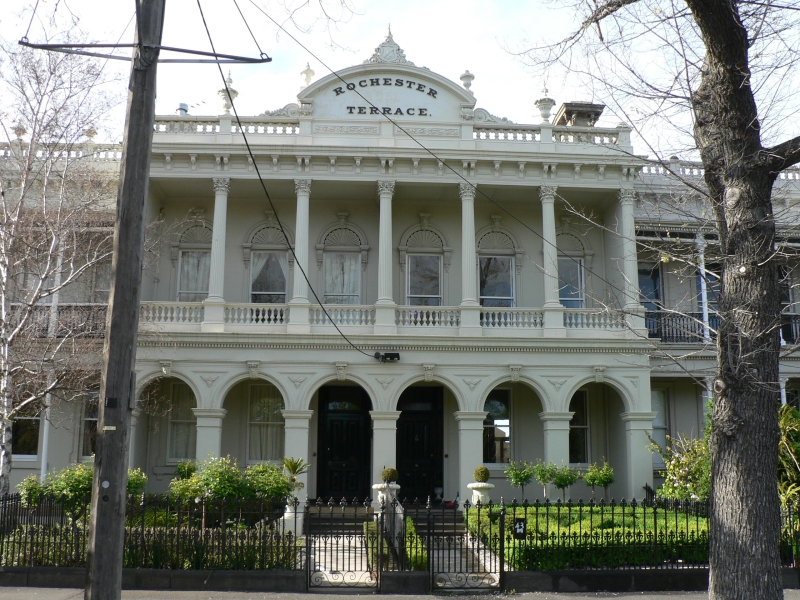
Rochester Terrace, Albert Park (1869–1879). Detail of the central pavilion.

==== Victorian Free Classical ====
In the Victorian era, Australia underwent major and rapid changes. The wool boom of the 1840s was followed by the gold rushes of the 1850s-1860s, fueling a major migration boom. In 1852, more ships sailed to Melbourne than to any other port in the world, and Australians became the richest people, with GDP per person overtaking the British and the Dutch. This migrant society enacted major democratic reforms, such as the extension of suffrage, the invention of the secret ballot, and the eight-hour day. Australia's enlightened society sought an architectural language to flaunt its newfound prosperity, and found it in an exaggerated Classical style that took inspiration from the "extroverted pomp of imperial Rome and the grandeur of the fully developed European Renaissance." The Classical style embodied solidity, permanency, reason and rationality. Buildings in the Victorian Academic Classical style were symmetrical in plan and massing, and involved correct application of one of the five architectural orders to determine proportions. Most examples of this style are non-residential. However the restrictions of this style did not suit the ebullient attitudes of the era, and many buildings were built in the Victorian Free Classical style; employing classical elements with little care shown towards the proper rules of the Academic style. Most terrace rows that feature classical components were built in this Victorian Free Classical style. A fine example of a Victorian Free Classical terrace is Drummond Terrace (1890–91), Carlton, designed by Walter Scott Law, whose facade is dominated by a three tiered colonnaded arcade.

Often, terraces built in the Victorian Classical style directly alluded to the grand rows of Neoclassical terraces of Georgian era England. Clarendon Terrace, built in 1857, is a terrace of three houses designed to look like one large neoclassical mansion. The central house features a magnificent portico of giant order Corinthian columns. One of the most notable examples is St Vincent Gardens development in Albert Park. Built in the traditional manner of a London square, grand boom-style terraces houses look out over an extensive public garden. The centrepiece is Rochester Terrace, built in two stages between 1869 and 1879 as an investment for the auctioneer W. P. Buckhurst. In the centre of the row, and flanking each end, are three classical style pavilions with Corinthian order columns and classical entablature. The row is reminiscent of the elegant crescents of Regency England, such as Carlton House Terrace, Westminster (1827–1832), and Cumberland Terrace, Regents Park (1826), both built by John Nash.

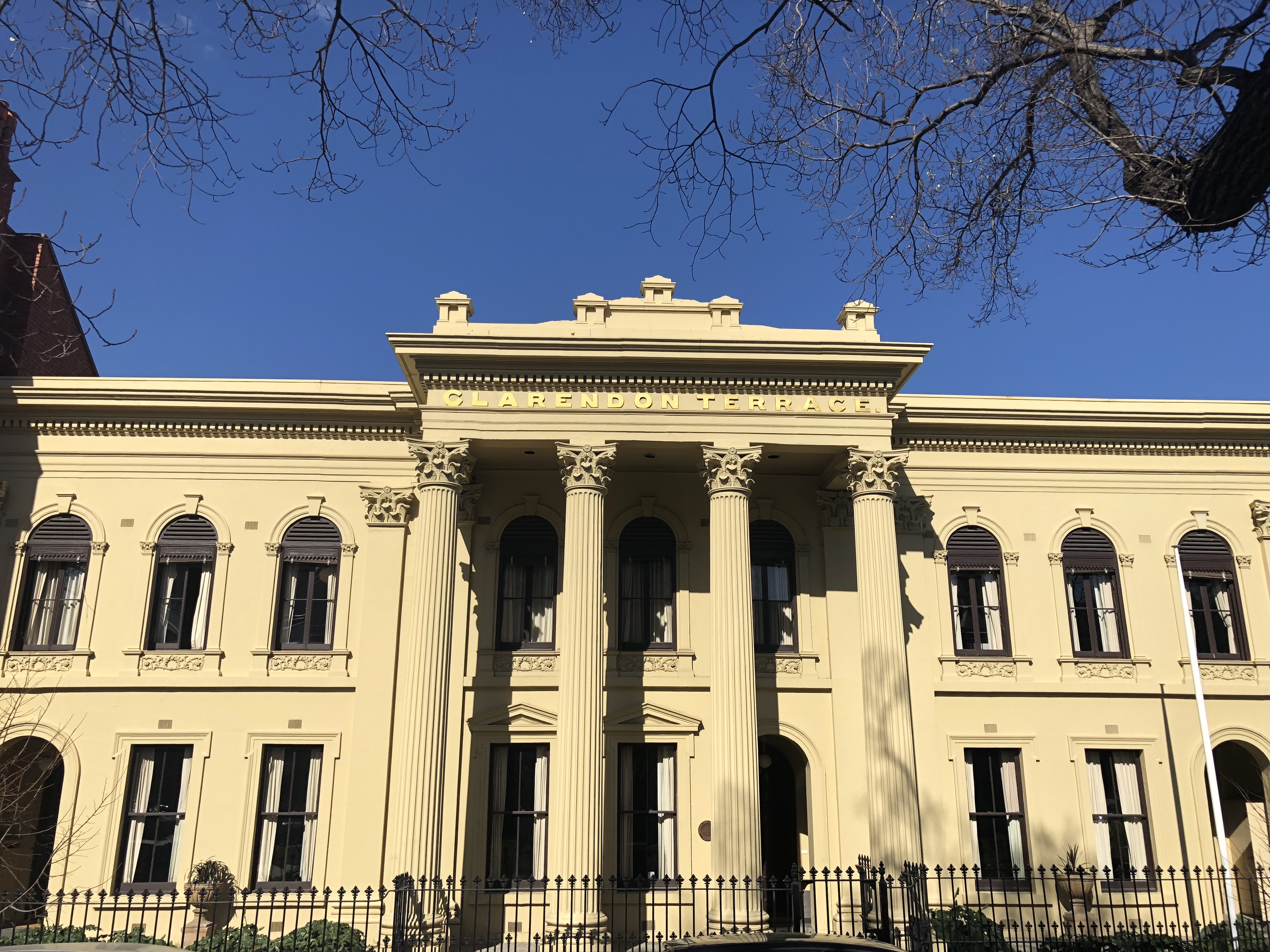
Clarendon Terrace, East Melbourne, Victoria (1857). A grand terrace of three houses designed by to look like a single large neoclassical mansion.

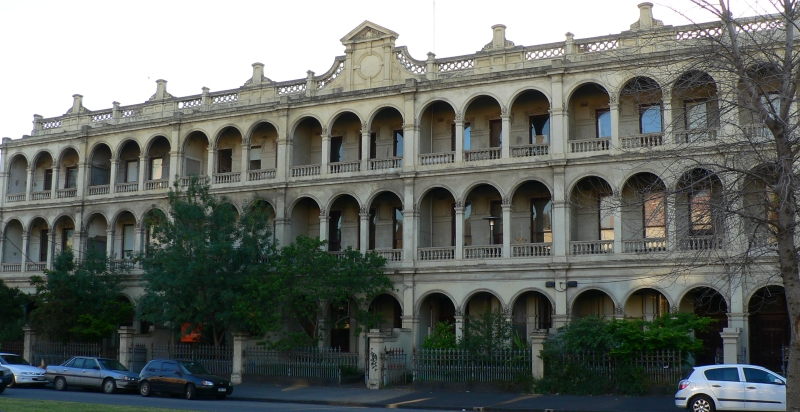
Drummond Terrace, Carlton (1890–91). A fine Victorian Free Classical terrace with three tiered arcade along the street facade.

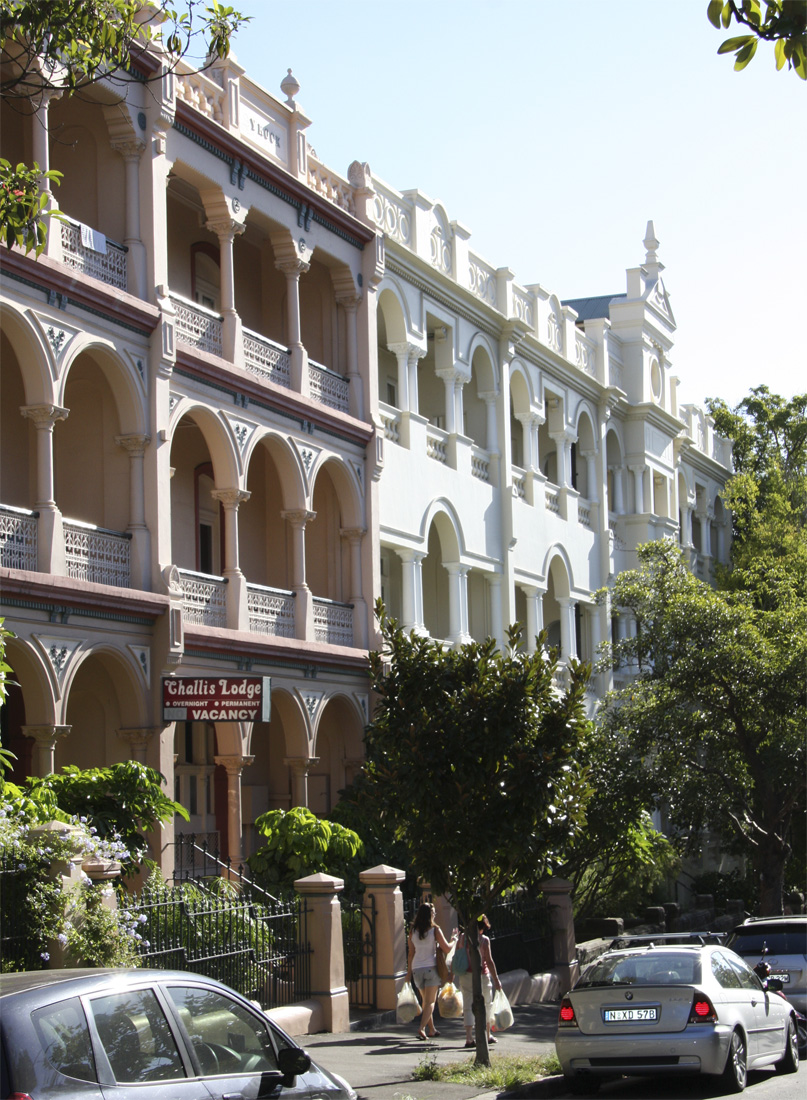
Byrock (left) and Carmelita (right) terraces on Challis Avenue in Potts Point

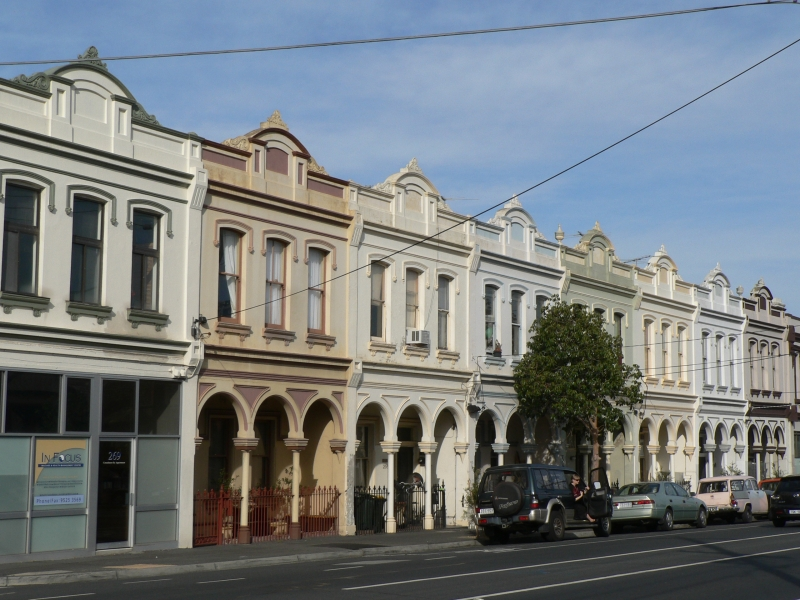
Classically arcaded terrace row, Balaclava.

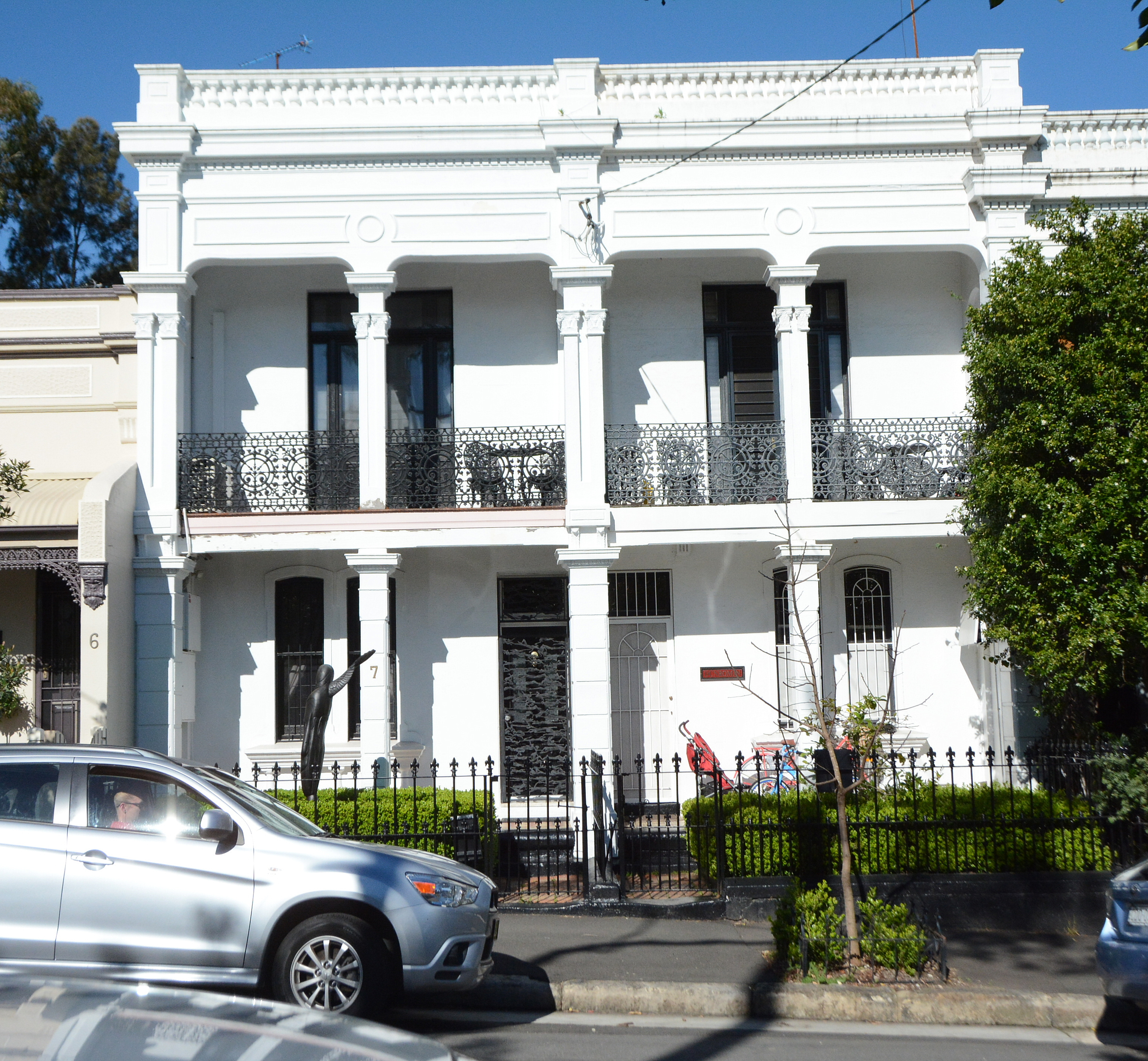
Terraces in Erskineville

==== Victorian Second Empire ====
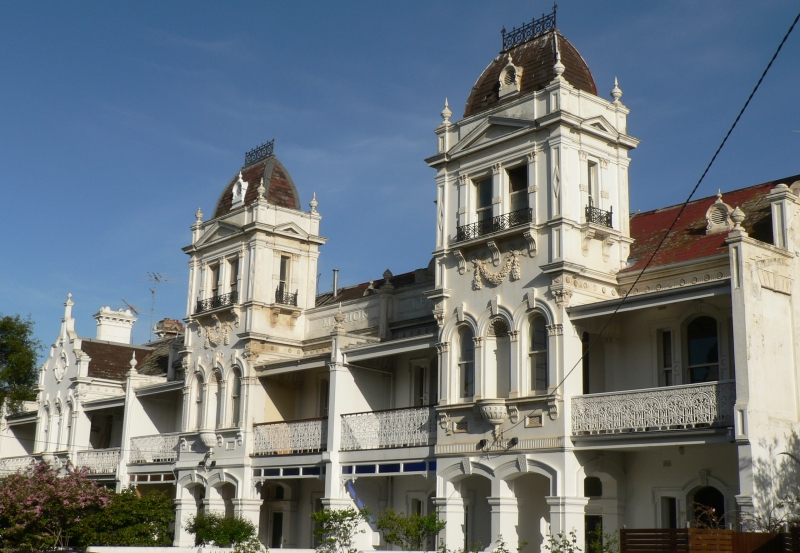
Marion Terrace, St Kilda (1883), a unique example of a terrace influenced by the Second Empire style.

The Second Empire style was an architectural style popular in 19th century Europe, and used most notably in during the reign of Emperor Napoleon III in France (1852–1871) to convey a sense of majesty and grandeur towards the Second French Empire. In Australia, the style was used mostly on lavish mansions to convey a sense of aristocracy, such as at Goodrest, South Yarra (1885); and Labassa, Caulfield North (1890). It is exceedingly rare on terrace houses, with few known examples. The best known Second Empire terrace is Marion Terrace, St Kilda (1883) a row of eight (now six) houses with two prominent three-storey towers, surmounted by curved mansard roofs with cast iron cresting. Another example is Darwin House, Fitzroy (1886).

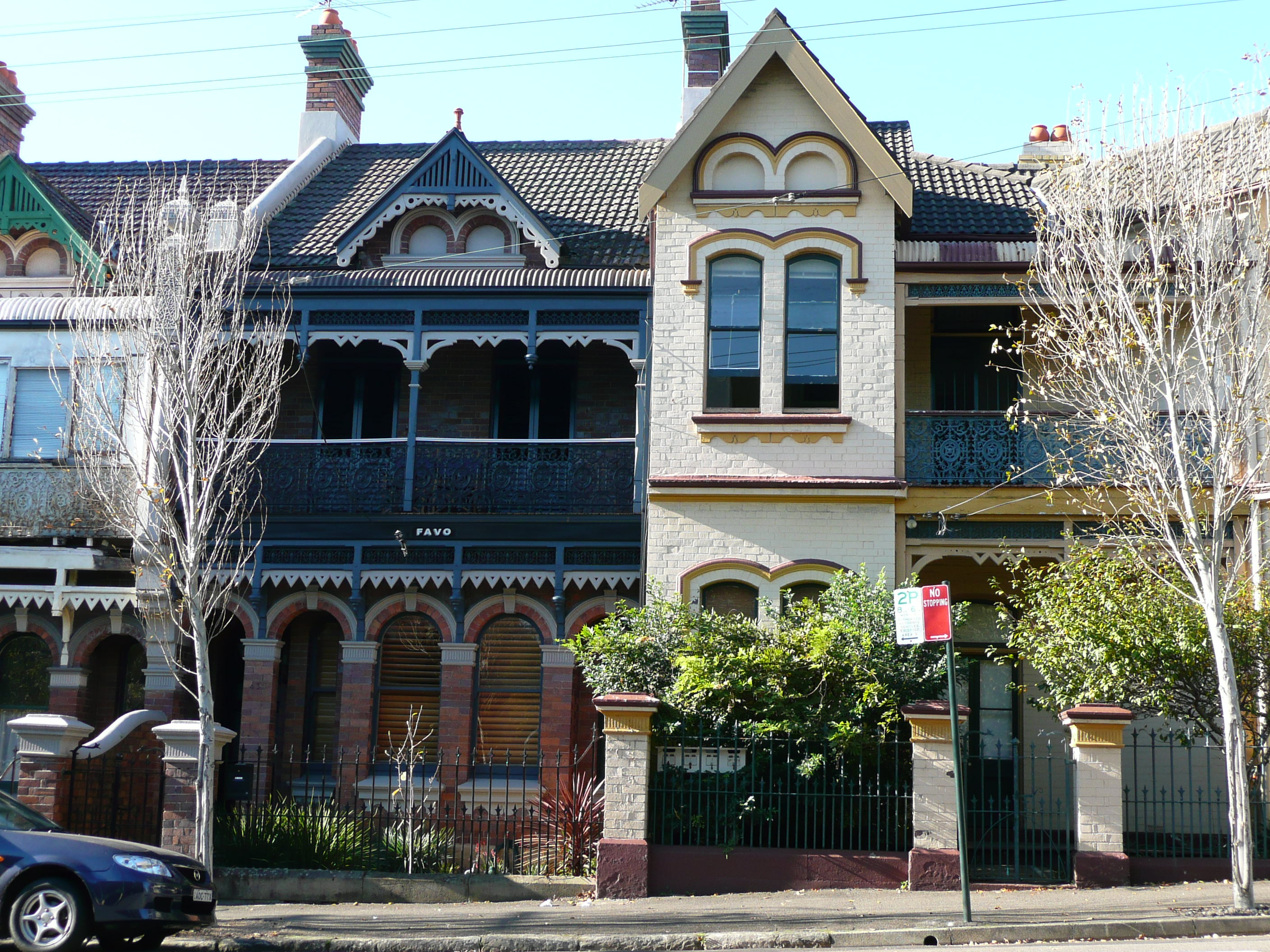
Edna, Favo, & Gaza; Glebe (c. 1899-1900), eclectic, red-brick Federation Filigree terraces demonstrating a cocktail of Queen Anne, Italianate, and Romanesque components.

=== Federation Era (c. 1890 – c. 1915) ===
==== Federation Filigree ====
In the Federation Era, the style remained essentially the same; Filigree-style terrace rows were still characterised by a filigree'd verandah screen that stood proud of the building and dominated the facade. What changed was the materials. The facades of Victorian-Era terraces varied but in contrast, one of the defining characteristics of Federation architecture is the prevalence of the unrendered, red brick facade. This was driven by a historicist interest in the architecture of the Queen Anne period, a kind of reactionary homage to an imagined England of the past. In red brick, the Federation Era had found its staple ingredient, spreading it on every external-facing wall, from train stations to substations, from mansions to terrace houses.

The most marked and relevant change in the Filigree Style was to the filigree itself. While cast iron was predominant, a variety of materials had always been used as verandah ornamentation, including wrought iron and timber. In the Federation Era, cast iron was eclipsed by timber, which became the dominant filigree component. A reactionary dismay at the standardised, industrial nature of the Victorian Era had led to a demand for novel, naturalised materials such as timber and wrought iron. Timber had a natural feeling to its usage, but in truth it was just as manufactured as cast ironwork. Advancements in technology lead to steam-powered and, later, electricity-powered machines such as bandsaws, jigsaws, and lathes. Suddenly, timber could be carved, fretted, and turned, quickly and cheaply, and vast quantities of timber verandah ornamentation became available to the mass market. Wrought iron, worked by hand and containing the all the individual quirks of a crafted commodity, was perhaps the truer expression of this desire for natural forms. Eastbourne House and terraces, East Melbourne (1906), likely designed by Robert Haddon in a florid, personal interpretation of a Federation Art Nouveau-Filigree style, uses wrought iron to smash apart established understanding of lacework balcony norms, drawing the balustrade out and down in a tendril to link up with the frieze beneath it.

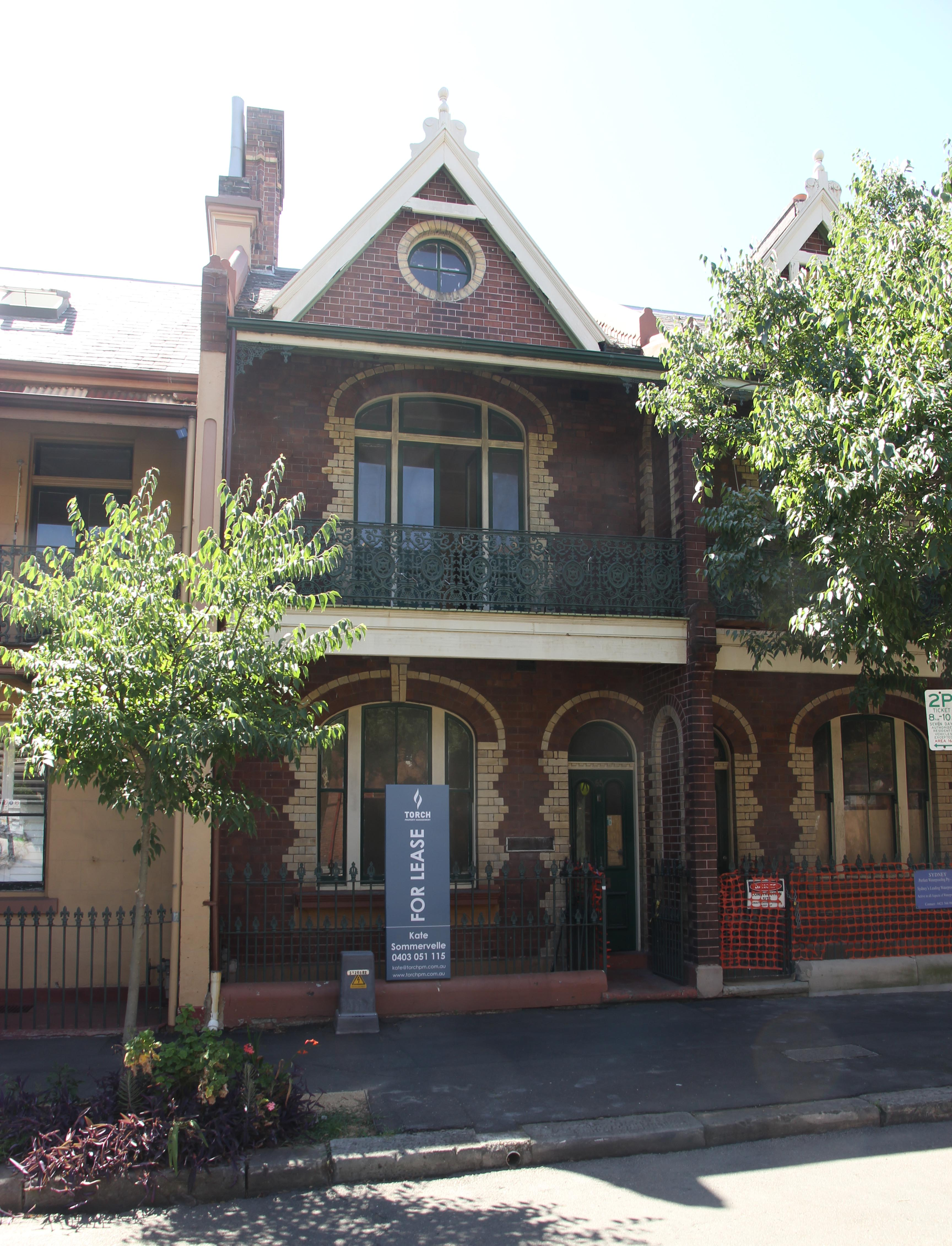
Vermont Terrace, Millers Point (1891). An early, fairly groundbreaking terrace-pair, with polychrome brick and rounded windows. Possibly designed by Morell & Kemp.

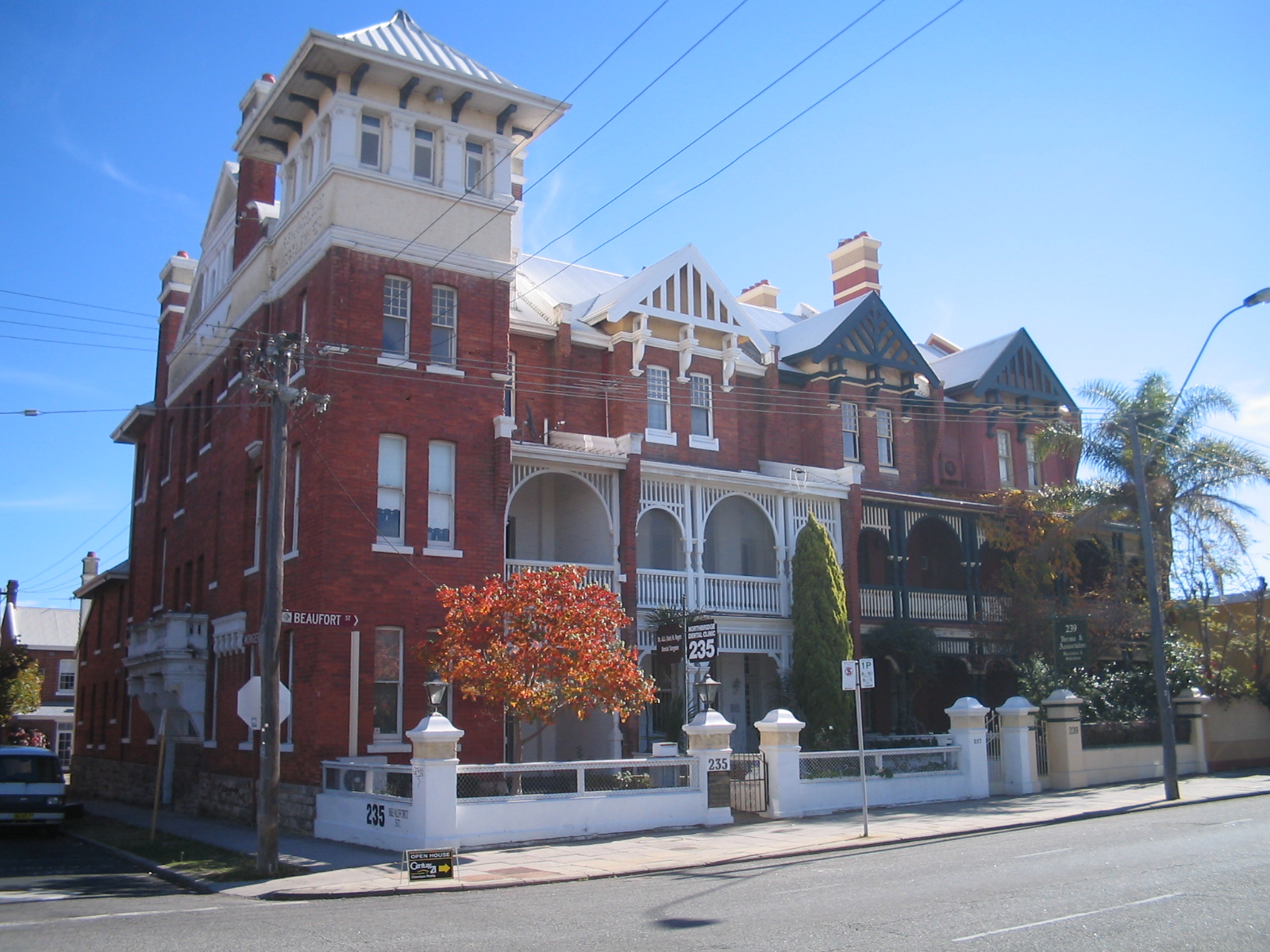
A row of Federation Queen Anne-Filigree grand-terraces, Perth (c.1897). Turned timber comprises all filigree verandah components.

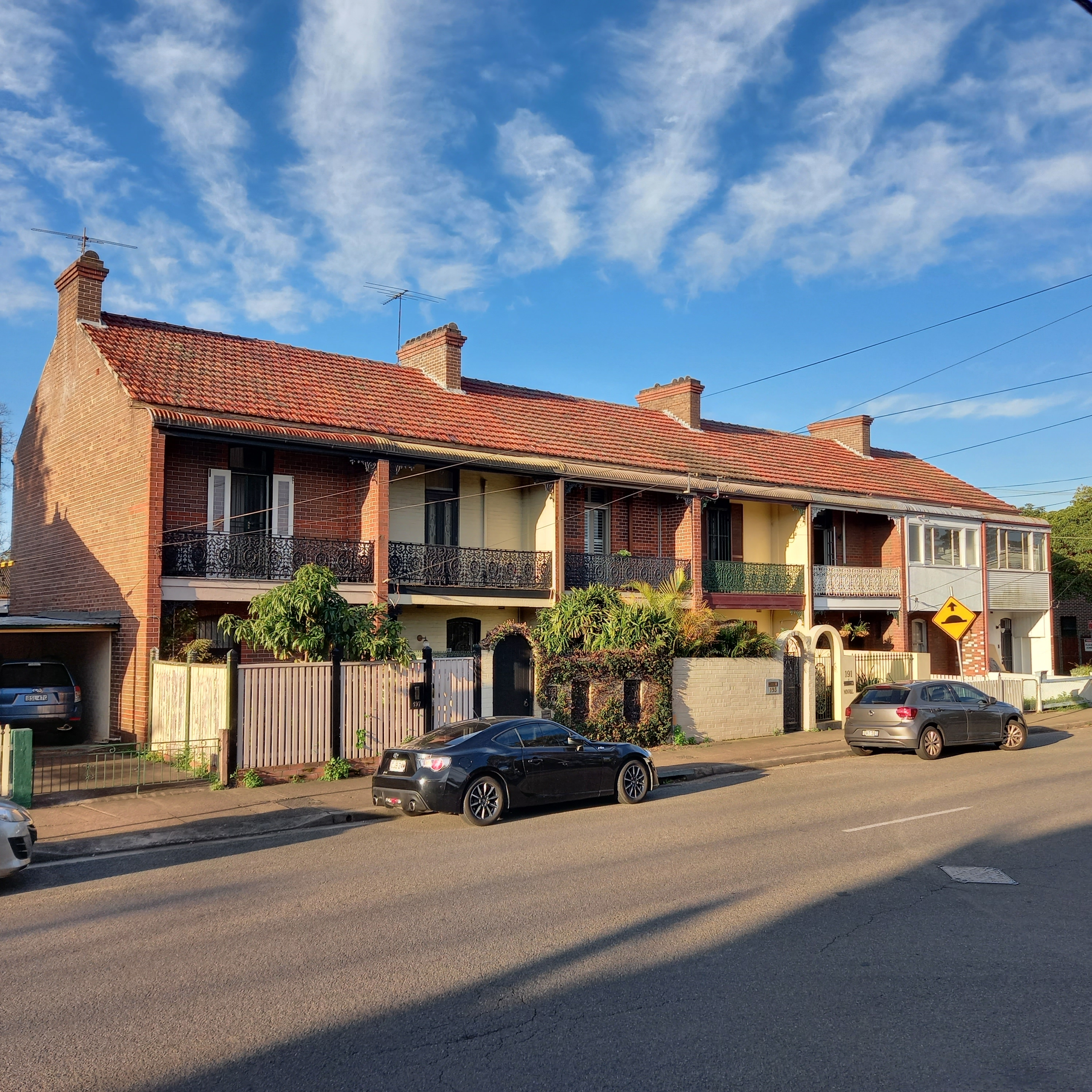
Fulham Terrace, Croydon (1904).

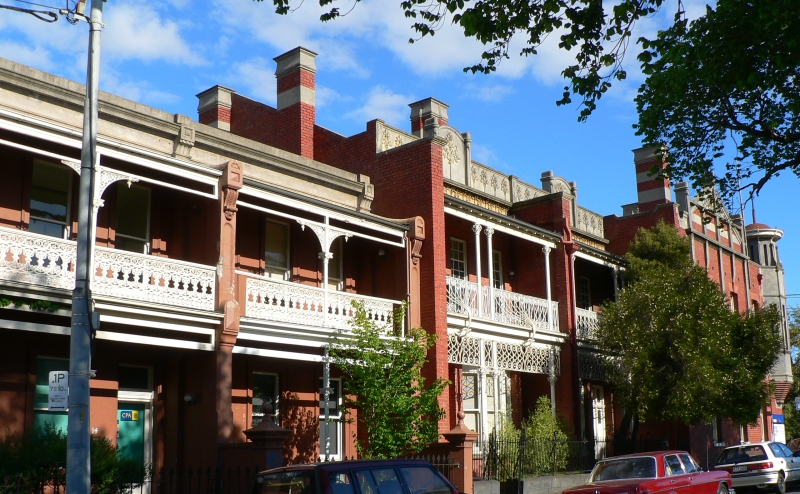
Eastbourne House and terraces, East Melbourne (1906), a private hospital with attached terrace pair, likely designed by Robert Haddon.

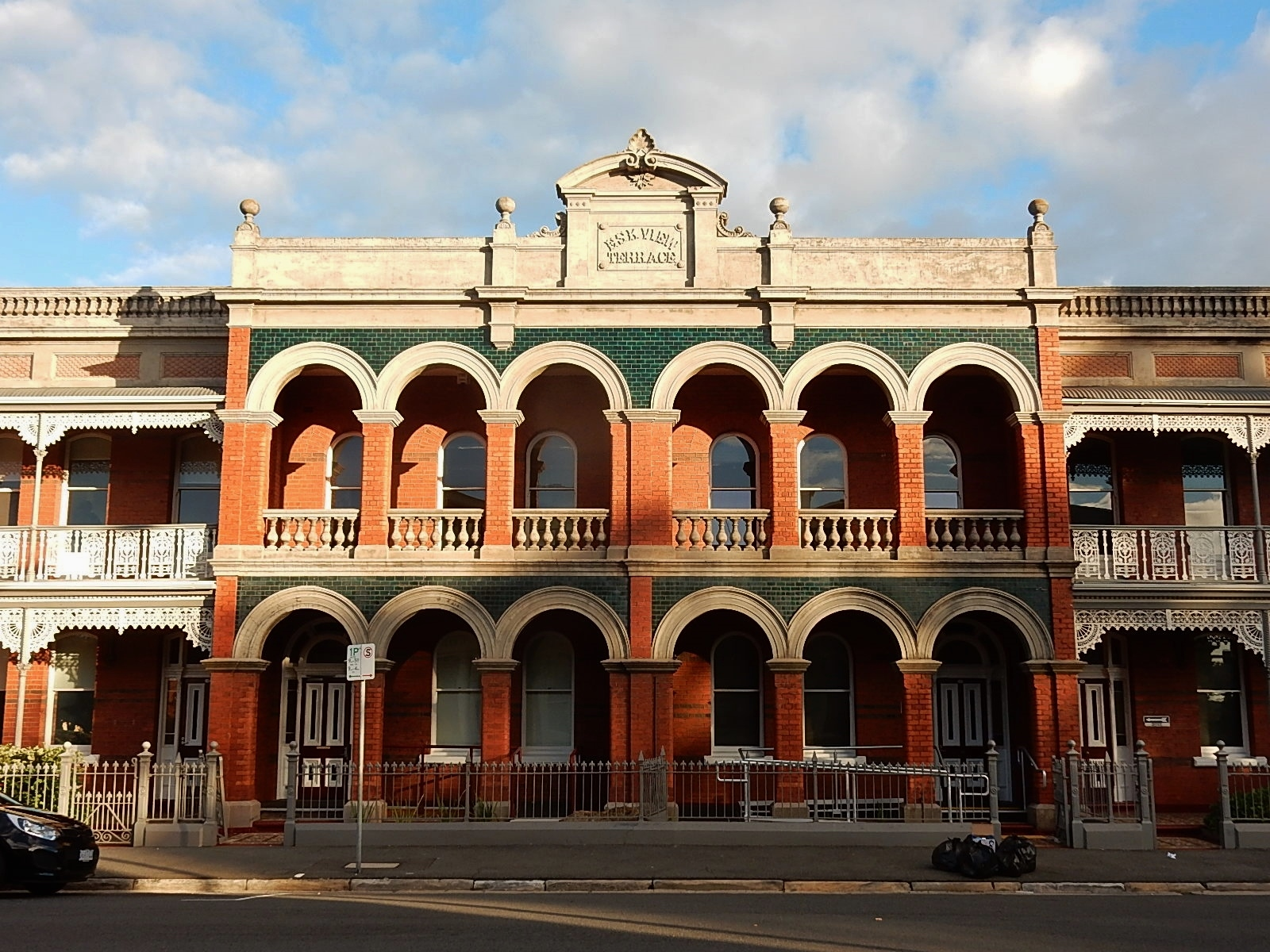
Esk View Terrace, Launceston (c.1905), built as a pair with Middlesex Terrace, further up the street.

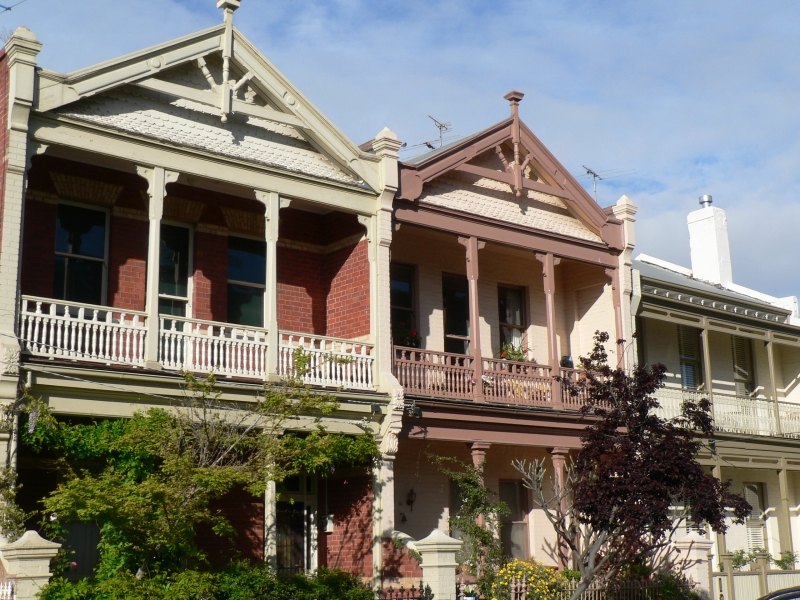
Federation Filigree terrace-pair, Albert Park, date unknown.

==== Federation Romanesque ====
Australian adaptations of Romanesque-style architecture took their lead from European and American developments in the style. Federation Romanesque architecture often complimented red-brick with terracotta wall tiles, and featured robust, blocky massing and round-headed archways.

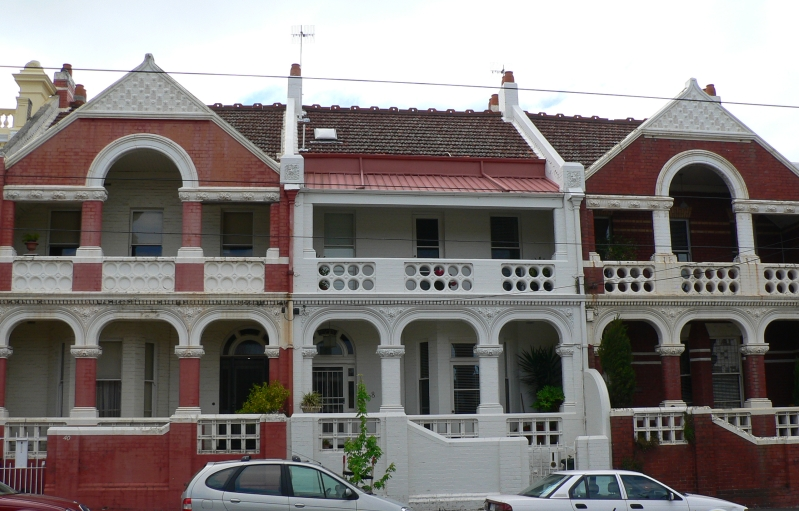
Terrace row, South Yarra (c. 1899). Frank Stapley, architect.

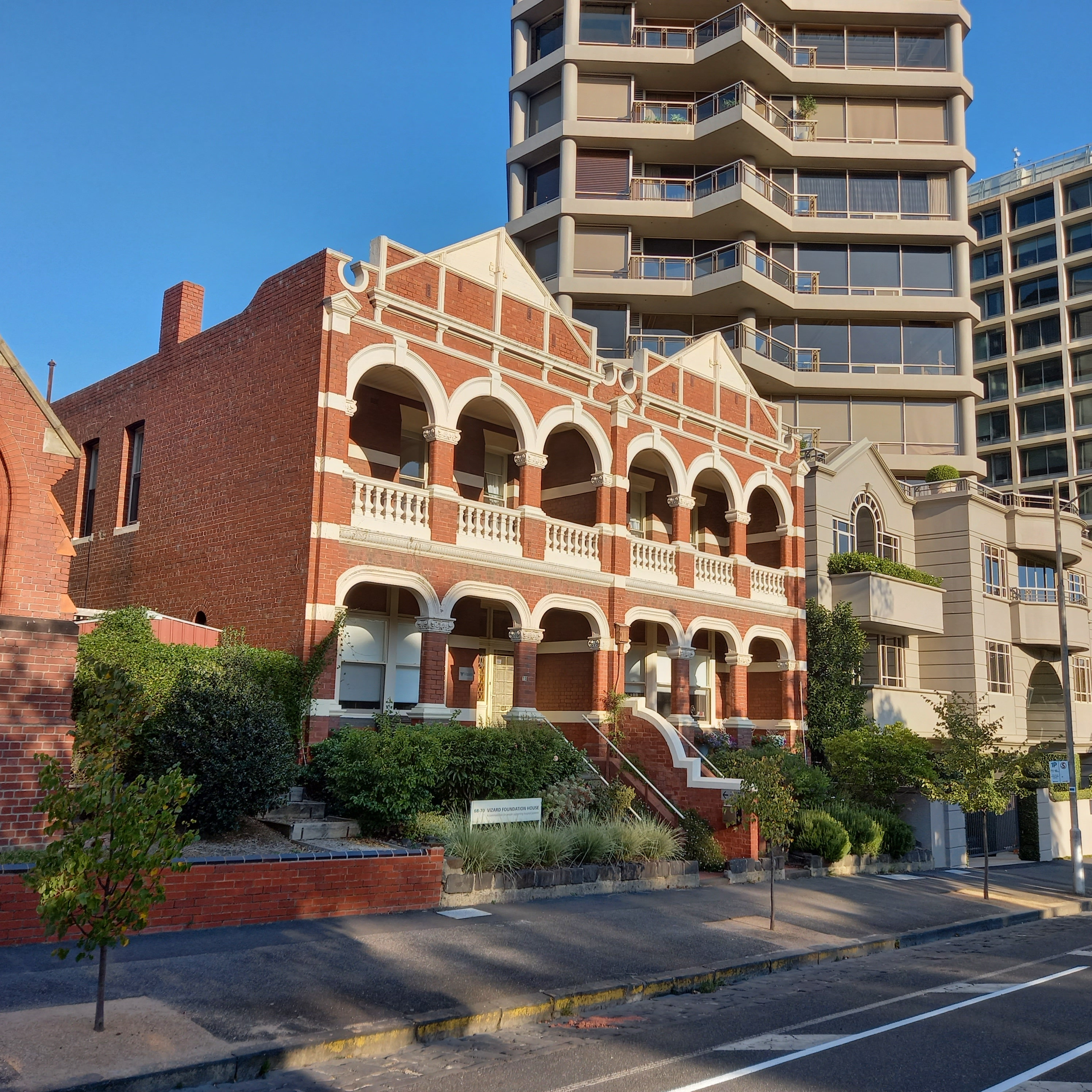
Terrace-pair, East Melbourne (c. 1908). Grainger, Kennedy & Little, architects.

== See also ==
- Architecture of Sydney
- Architecture of Melbourne
- Georgian architecture
- Mashrabiya

== Bibliography ==
- Apperly, Richard; Irving, Robert; Reynolds, Peter A Pictorial Guide to Identifying Australian Architecture: Styles and Terms from 1788 to the Present, 1989, Angus & Robertson.
- Fowles, Joseph Sydney in 1848 (annotated Facsimile edition), 1962, Ure Smith, ISBN 0-7254-0139-7
- Howells, Trevor; Morris, Colleen The Terrace Houses in Australia, 1999, Lansdowne Publishing Pty Ltd, ISBN 1-86302-649-5
- Turner, Brian Australia's Iron Lace, 1985, George Allen & Unwin Australia Pty Ltd, ISBN 0-86861-481-5
- Turner, Brian The Australian Terrace House, 1995, Angus & Robertson, ISBN 0-207-18663-4
- Robertson, E. Graeme Sydney Lace, 1962, Georgian House, Melbourne
- Robertson, E. Graeme Adelaide Lace, 1973, Rigby Limited
- Robertson, E. Graeme; Robertson, Joan Decorative Cast Iron In Australia, 1884, Currey O'Neil Ross Pty Ltd, ISBN 0-670-90253-5
