= Newcastle Inner City Bypass =

Freeway in New South Wales

Newcastle Inner City Bypass New South Wales

- Coordinates: 32°59′40.4″S 151°41′16.1″E; 32°51′51.1″S 151°42′12.6″E

General information
- Type: Motorway
- Length: 15.6 km (9.7 mi) (upon completion)
- Gazetted: July 1946 (as State Highway 23)
- Route number(s): A37 (2013–present)
- Former route number: State Route 123 (1974–2013)

Major junctions
Bennetts Green – New Lambton Heights (7.6 km)
- South end: Pacific Highway; Bennetts Green
- Warners Bay Road; Hillsborough Road; Myall Road; Carnley Avenue; Cardiff Road
- North end: McCaffrey Drive; New Lambton Heights
Jesmond – Sandgate (4.9 km)
- South end: Newcastle Road; Jesmond
- University Drive; Sandgate Road
- North end: Pacific Highway; Sandgate

Location(s)
- Region: Hunter
- Major suburbs: Windale, Mount Hutton, Hillsborough, Kotara, New Lambton Heights, Jesmond, Birmingham Gardens, Shortland

Highway system
- Highways in Australia; National Highway • Freeways in Australia; Highways in New South Wales

Newcastle Inner City Bypass is a motorway in Newcastle and Lake Macquarie, New South Wales, Australia. Originally cobbled together from a collection of arterial roads, it has been slowly upgraded and lengthened in sections over the years.

The project opened on 20 November 2026.

== Route ==
The road is divided into five sections. The first, and southernmost, section is the West Charlestown Bypass, a 6.5-kilometre-long (4.0 mi) freeway standard road, which commences at the intersection with Pacific Highway at Bennetts Green and heads in a northerly direction. The second section leads up the ridge and consists of parts of Charlestown Road and Lookout Road as a divided dual-carriageway arterial road. The third section, currently under construction, will be a freeway diverging from Lookout Road near the intersection of McCaffrey Drive, skirting around the west of John Hunter Hospital to join the next section at Newcastle Road. The fourth section is a freeway-standard bypass of Jesmond from Newcastle Road continuing north, and the fifth section is a freeway extension from the northern end of the Jesmond Bypass to terminate at the intersection with Pacific Highway at Sandgate.

With the third section of the route not yet completed, a more circuitous route through suburban roads remains in use for the gap between the second and fourth sections. From the end of the Charlestown Bypass, it is necessary to follow Lookout Road, which becomes Croudace Street, before turning left onto Newcastle Road. Approximately 1.3 km (0.8 mi) after turning left, the Inner City Bypass is rejoined by turning right at the former Jesmond roundabout.

== History ==
The Newcastle Inner City Bypass route was first planned in the 1950s to connect the Bennetts Green area to Pacific Highway at Sandgate; it was approved in 1957 and subsequently incorporated in the Northumberland County Planning Scheme. The concept of the Newcastle Inner City Bypass emerged from the decision to route the Sydney to Newcastle Freeway west of Lake Macquarie in the mid-1970s: up to that point the freeway was proposed east of Lake Macquarie and involved corridor reservations for high-standard bypasses of Swansea, Belmont and Charlestown. The corridors for Swansea and Belmont have been abandoned, however the corridor from Bennetts Green to Sandgate was maintained by the Department of Main Roads to ultimately provide a bypass of inner Newcastle.

The passing of the Main Roads Act of 1924 through the Parliament of New South Wales provided for the declaration of Main Roads, roads partially funded by the State government through the Department of Main Roads. State Highway 23 was declared along this road on 31 July 1946, from the intersection with Pacific Highway at Charlestown, along Charlestown Road via Kotara to Jesmond, and then via Birmingham Gardens along Sandgate Road to the intersection of Pacific Highway at Sandgate. The highway was redeclared along each section of the bypass as they opened.

The passing of the Roads Act of 1993 through the Parliament of New South Wales updated road classifications and the way they could be declared within New South Wales. Under this act, the declaration of Highway 23 runs from the intersection with Pacific Highway at Windale via West Charlestown Bypass, Charlestown and Lookout and Croudace Roads to Newcastle Road at Lambton, then from Newcastle Road at Jesmond to Pacific Highway at Sandgate. Despite its classification as a Highway, it still has no officially gazetted name, and is known only locally as Newcastle Inner City Bypass.

Newcastle Inner City Bypass was signed State Route 123 along its entire length in 1974, moving to new sections of the bypass as they opened. With the conversion to the newer alphanumeric system in 2013, this was replaced with route A37.

=== Construction ===
The Newcastle Inner City Bypass was not built in a contiguous fashion, with separate sections opened slowly at different times over the following 50 years.

The second section, a 2.4km-long section between Kotara and Rankin Park, was the subject of community debate regarding the location and standard of road to be constructed. In the late 1960s, the Department of Main Roads proposed to construct a major elevated roadway as part of this section, which would have required a strip acquisition of Blackbutt Reserve between Carnley Avenue and McCaffrey Drive. Community concerns against the proposal's effect on the environmentally-sensitive Blackbutt Reserve led to the abandonment of the route through Blackbutt Reserve and the existing Lookout Road section was widened and constructed as a four-lane dual-carriageway arterial road in lieu of freeway conditions, with at-grade intersections at Carnley Avenue, Hurn Street, Cardiff Road and Grandview Road, completed in 1983.

The fourth section of the bypass, a 3.2km-long section between Newcastle Road at Jesmond and Sandgate Road at Shortland and previously known as the "Jesmond to Shortland Relief Route", was the first portion of freeway-standard road to be approved in January 1981. Construction started in May 1984, and the road was opened to traffic in June 1993.

The first section, the 6.5km West Charlestown Bypass, commenced earthworks construction in July 2000, and was opened to traffic in early 2003.

Pre-construction works for the fifth (northernmost) section, the 2.3km-long section between Sandgate Road at Shortland and Pacific Highway at Sandgate, began in June 2010. The work to be completed as part of that contract was for digging a cutting where the Sandgate Road bridge has been built over the bypass and filling two other areas, including constructing retaining walls and relocating water mains. The contract for construction of that section was awarded to Reed Constructions in February 2011, with work starting in April 2011. On 28 May 2012 Roads & Maritime Services terminated its contract with Reed Constructions which had been placed in liquidation, and remaining works were completed by Thiess, the prime contractor for the Hunter Expressway. The Shortland – Sandgate section of the bypass was unofficially opened on 16 January 2014 and opened to traffic on 23 January 2014.

In June 2014, the NSW Government announced it would provide $280 million to complete the third section (i.e. Rankin Park to Jesmond section) of the bypass, including $150 million from Restart NSW. It includes building a new and improved entrance to the John Hunter Hospital. In February 2019, it was approved by the state government. Major construction began in late 2021, targeting completion in mid 2025. Construction continues into 2026. The project connected Rankin Park and Jesmond in June 2026.

The project opened on 20 November 2026.

== Interchanges ==
LGA	Location	km	mi	Destinations	Notes
Lake Macquarie	Bennetts Green	0.0	0.0	Pacific Highway (A43), Charlestown, Newcastle, Belmont, Sydney	Southern terminus of Newcastle Inner City Bypass and route A37 at traffic lights
Lake Macquarie	Bennetts Green	0.0	0.0	Lake Street, Windale	
Lake Macquarie	Hillsborough	2.2	1.4	Warners Bay Road, Charlestown, Warners Bay	Half-diamond interchange with one roundabout, northbound entry and southbound exit only
Lake Macquarie	Hillsborough	4.1	2.5	Hillsborough Road (B57), Charlestown, Warners Bay	Dogbone interchange
Lake Macquarie	Kotara South	5.3	3.3	Myall Road, Cardiff, Kotara	Northbound entry and exit only
Newcastle	Kotara	5.5	3.4	Charlestown Road/Park Avenue/Johnson Street, Cardiff, Kotara	Southbound entry and exit only
Newcastle	Kotara	5.6	3.5	Main Northern railway line through Tickhole Tunnel	
Newcastle	Kotara	6.2	3.9	Carnley Avenue, Broadmeadow	Traffic lights
Newcastle	New Lambton Heights	6.8	4.2	Cardiff Road – Cardiff	Traffic lights
Newcastle	New Lambton Heights	7.6	4.7	McCaffrey Drive – Wallsend	
Newcastle	New Lambton Heights	7.6	4.7	Lookout Road – Lambton, John Hunter Hospital	Route A37 continues north along Lookout Road at traffic lights
Newcastle	Rankin Park			Newcastle Inner City Bypass, section 3	Rankin Park to Jesmond section under construction
Newcastle	Jesmond	10.7	6.6	Newcastle Road (A15 west, A15/A37 east) – Lambton, Newcastle, Charlestown, Wallsend	Roundabout; route A37 continues east along Newcastle Road
Newcastle	Birmingham Gardens	11.7	7.3	University Drive, Birmingham Gardens, Waratah West, University of Newcastle	Roundabout interchange
Newcastle	Shortland	13.9	8.6	Sandgate Road – Shortland, Hunter Wetlands Centre	Partial offset dumbbell interchange, no southbound exit
Newcastle	Sandgate	14.8	9.2	Main North railway line	
Newcastle	Sandgate	15.6	9.7	Pacific Highway (A43), Hexham, Maitland, Taree	Northern terminus of Newcastle Inner City Bypass and route A37 at traffic lights
1.000 mi = 1.609 km; 1.000 km = 0.621 mi: Incomplete access; Route transition; Unopened

== See also ==
- Highways in Australia
- List of freeways in Australia
- List of highways in New South Wales
