= Kooragang =

- Suburb
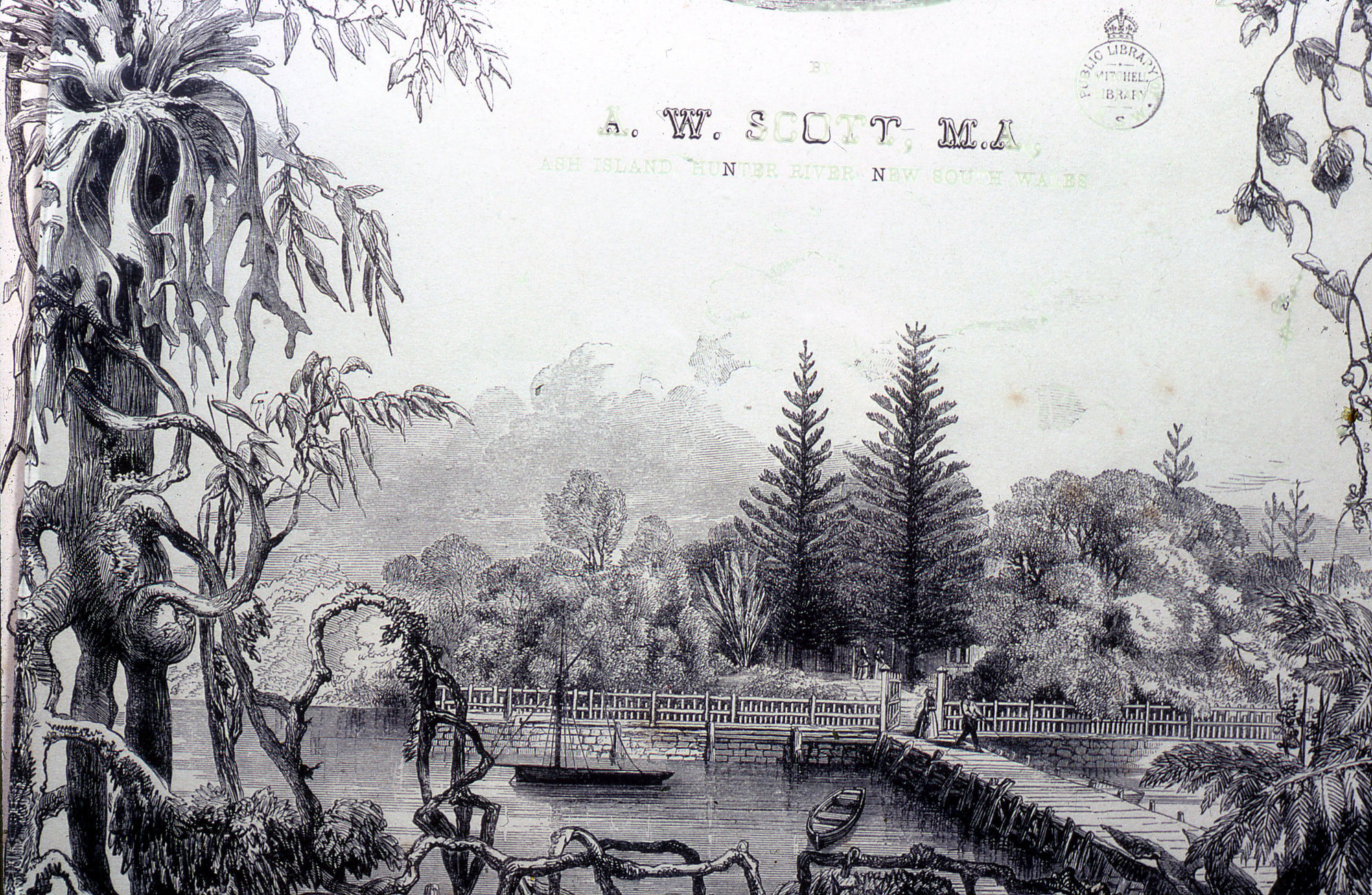
- The former Alexander Walker Scott's Estate on Ash Island

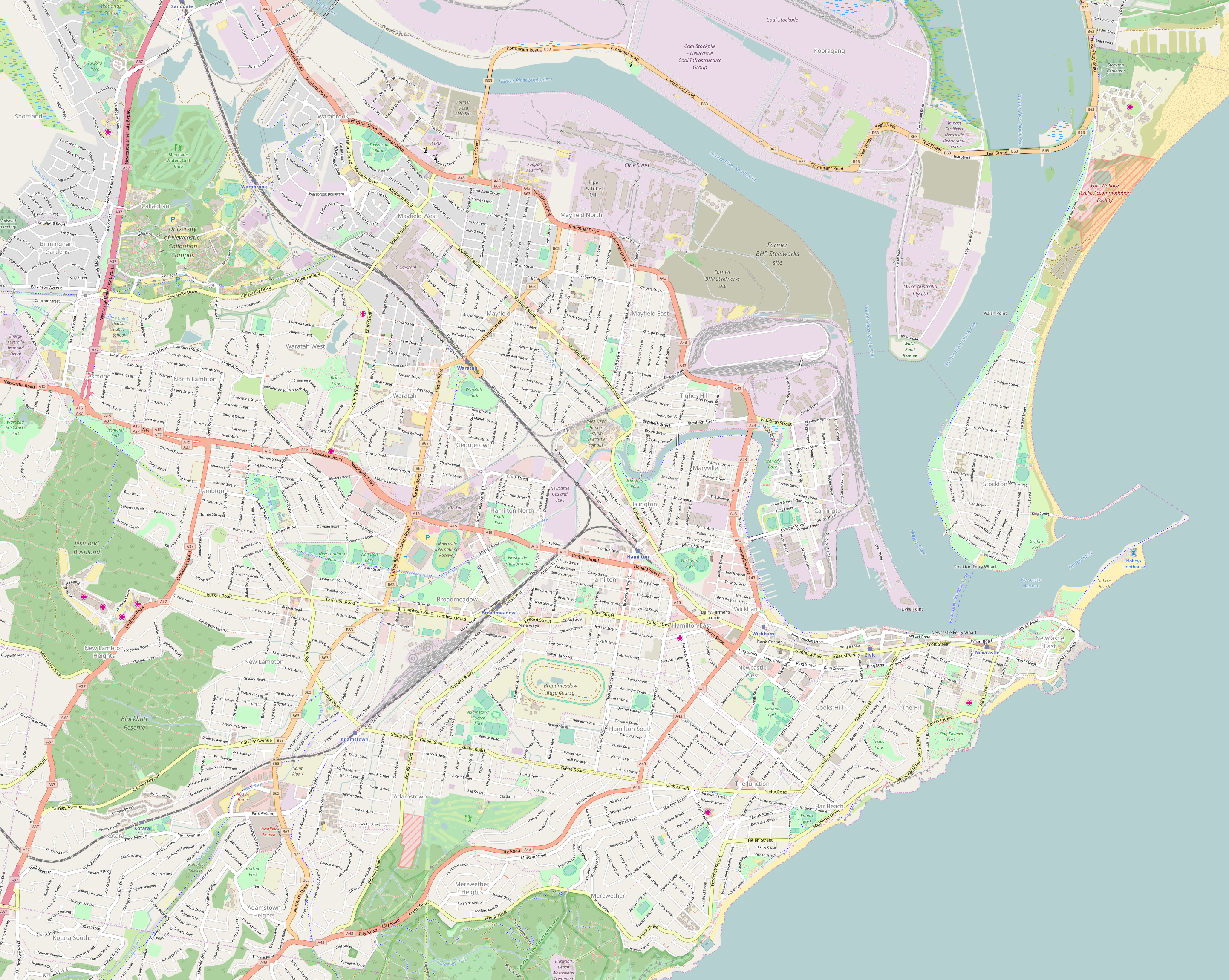
- Coordinates: 32°52′34″S 151°46′4″E
- Country: Australia
- State: New South Wales
- Region: Hunter
- City: Newcastle
- LGA: City of Newcastle
- Location: 169 km (105 mi) NNE of Sydney; 9.3 km (5.8 mi) NNW of Newcastle

Government
  - State electorate: Newcastle
  - Federal division: Newcastle

Area (Note: Area calculation is based on 1:100000 map 9232 NEWCASTLE.)
  - Total: 35.4 km^{2} (13.7 sq mi)
- Elevation (Note: Kooragang is primarily flat. The average elevation of the suburb is as shown on 1:100000 map 9232 NEWCASTLE.): 3 m (9.8 ft)

Population
  - Total: 4 (SAL 2021)
- Time zone: UTC+10 (AEST)
  - Summer (DST): UTC+11 (AEDT)
- Postcode: 2304
- County: Northumberland
- Parish: Newcastle
- Mean max temp: 21.8 °C (71.2 °F)
- Mean min temp: 14.2 °C (57.6 °F)
- Annual rainfall: 1,131.3 mm (44.54 in)
Suburbs around Kooragang
Tarro	Tomago	Fullerton Cove
Hexham	Kooragang	Fern Bay, Stockton
Sandgate	Mayfield West, Mayfield North, Carrington, Newcastle, Stockton	Stockton

Kooragang (/ˈkuːrəɡæŋ/) is the largest suburb of the city of Newcastle, in the Hunter Region of New South Wales, Australia. Dominated by Kooragang Island, the eastern part of the suburb is primarily industrial, while the western part of the suburb consists of nature reserves. Covering an area of 35.4 km^{2} (13.7 sq mi), at the 2021 census, there were 4 people living in the suburb.

== Geography ==
Kooragang extends from Stockton in the southeast, to the eastern bridge at Hexham (Note: Although known as the "Hexham bridge", there are actually two bridges crossing the Hunter River. Both are in the suburb of Tarro with the north and south ends of the bridges in Tomago and Hexham respectively.) in the northwest, a distance of 12.4 km (7.7 mi). Except for a small portion of land in Hexham, the north and south arms of the Hunter River forms Kooragang's borders. At its greatest, the suburb is approximately 3.8 km (2.4 mi) from southwest – northeast. Vehicular access to Kooragang is via three bridges. From Mayfield West the Tourle Street Bridge is the primary access to Kooragang, Stockton and Port Stephens from Newcastle suburbs. In the east of the suburb, the Stockton Bridge connects Kooragang to Stockton. Access to the western part of the suburb is via the Ash Island bridge at Hexham.

Kooragang is generally low and flat, with some build-up in the industrial area in the eastern part of the suburb, on Kooragang Island.

== History ==
Kooragang is dominated by Kooragang Island, which was created by reclaiming land, combining a number of smaller islands in the Hunter River estuary. The original islands were separated by mud flats and various channels and were first explored and surveyed by Europeans in 1801. Larger islands included Ash Island, Upper Moscheto, Moscheto Island, Dempsey Island, and Spit Island.

Ash Island was the largest of the islands, named because of the Ash trees that grew upon it. By 1821, much of Ash and other timber on the island had been harvested. In 1827 Alexander Scott was granted 1,036 ha (2,560 acres) of land there. After settling on the island in 1831, it grew as a community with many visitors. The original wooden bridge linking the island to the mainland was eventually replaced with a concrete bridge that is still used today. Fifty families lived on the island until it was devastated by the 1955 Hunter Valley floods. By the 1960s, industrial development closer to Newcastle resulted in a land reclamation scheme that combined the smaller islands into what is now Kooragang Island. The western part of Kooragang island, which is now home to the Kooragang Wetland Rehabilitation Project, is still known as Ash Island.

== Kooragang Island ==
=== Coal exports ===
The eastern and more well-known part of Kooragang Island is primarily a coal export port. It was established in 1984 by a BHP led consortium, with a capacity of 15 million tonnes per annum. By 2013 the capacity had been increased to 120 million tonnes per annum. In July 2013 a record high of 10.3 million tonnes of coal was processed through the port of Newcastle, with 83 of the 114 ships being loaded at the Kooragang terminal.

Transport of coal to Kooragang Island from Hunter valley coal mines is achieved via the Sandgate Flyover, with coal trains being moved through the port by a balloon loop.

=== Other industries ===
In addition to coal exports, many other industries exist on Kooragang Island, some having existed there since before the coal export port was established. Industries include Mountain Industries, which operates a bitumen plant, Blue Circle Southern Cement, Sims Metal recyclers and Orica Kooragang, which manufactures agricultural fertiliser and explosives for the mining industry. Orica Kooragang opened in 1969.

=== Electricity generation ===
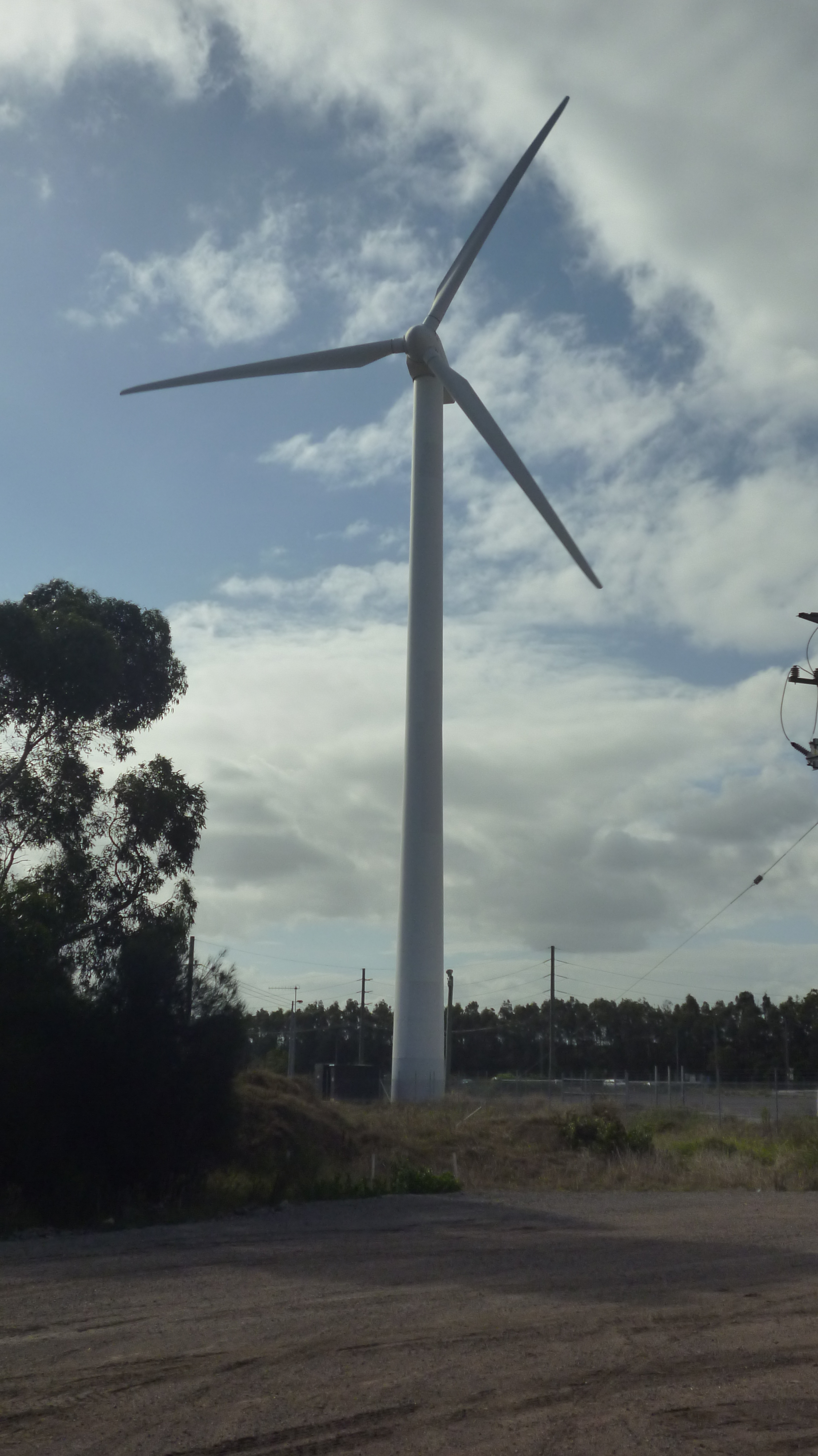
The wind turbine on Kooragang Island was a highly visible landmark for many years until its removal.

A single 600 kW wind turbine was installed on the island between Cormorant Road and the Hunter River in 1997, generating enough power for 150 homes per year. However, its future came into question because it sat on land that may be needed for a future ship turning basin. It was eventually dismantled on 29 October 2014. The turbine was later installed in Tasmania.

== Ash Island ==
Ash Island is 12 km (7 mi) west of the Newcastle CBD and covers an area of 780 ha (1,927 acres). It is accessed by a road bridge at the western end of the island. Originally, a wooden bridge was constructed to connected Ash Island from Hexham and a jetty was constructed near the Scott house. After concerns about the environmental impacts of industry the Coffey Inquiry was held in 1970 listing concerns over pollution and environmental degradation. It has over 200 species of birds and 15 species of frogs. There over 300 native plant species. It has a combination of rainforest, mangroves and saltmarshes. Europeans settlement introduced kikuyu grass to the area.

=== History ===
The Indigenous mobs of the Worimi and Awabakal were the first used the area as major food source. In 1797 Europeans discovered red cedar and ash trees. In 1801 Captain William Paterson commissioned a survey. In the 1800s industrial activity began on the island. In the 1860s the land was transformed to agricultural land and dairy farms. Ash Island has 17 dairy farms with 55 families living there. In 1921 the bridge built by the A.A Company was demolished. In 1955 all the families moved out due to major flooding. After this the NSW government took control of the land and leased it for grazing land. In the 1960s a large scale industrial development began and by 1968 become a part of Kooragang Island. In 1968, a 10 klometre railway line opened on Kooragang Island, branching off the Main Northern railway line to the west of Warabrook station. In 1984 the area was declared a Ramsar site, In 1983 Kooragang Nature Reserve was formed. In 1993 Kooragang Wetlands Rehabilitation Project was founded.

=== Notable people ===
In 1827 Alexander Walker Scott purchased 2,560 acres of land. In 1846 Scott moved his wife Harriet Calcott, step daughter Mary Ann and daughter Helena and Harriet from Sydney. Harriet Scott was 16 and her sister was 14 when they moved from Sydney to Ash Island. They were both famous artists with majority of their letters is displayed at the Australian Museum. In 1866 Scott became bankrupt and sold the property which was subdivided, cleared and drained. In 2020 Dr Bernadette Drabsh from the University of Newcastle and natural history student Rachel Klyvee released a documentary series about a project wanting the restore the scott's sister image.

Friedrich Wilhelm Ludwig Leichardt was a German born artist who visited the Hunter Region between 1842 and 1843. He was invited by Alexander Walker Scott to travel down to Ash Island. He arrived on Friday 23 September 1842 and spent 3–4 days on Ash Island. Many of his sketches are held in the National Library of Australia and State Library of New South Wales.

Conrad Marten was English artist who spent time on Charles Darwin's ship HMS Beagle. He travelled around the Hunter area between 1841 and 1852 visiting Ash Island. His drawings from the Hunter area are digitised in the State Library of New South Wales.

=== Heritage listings ===
131 Radar Station, located on Ash Island, is a heritage-listed site.
