= Warabrook =

- Suburb
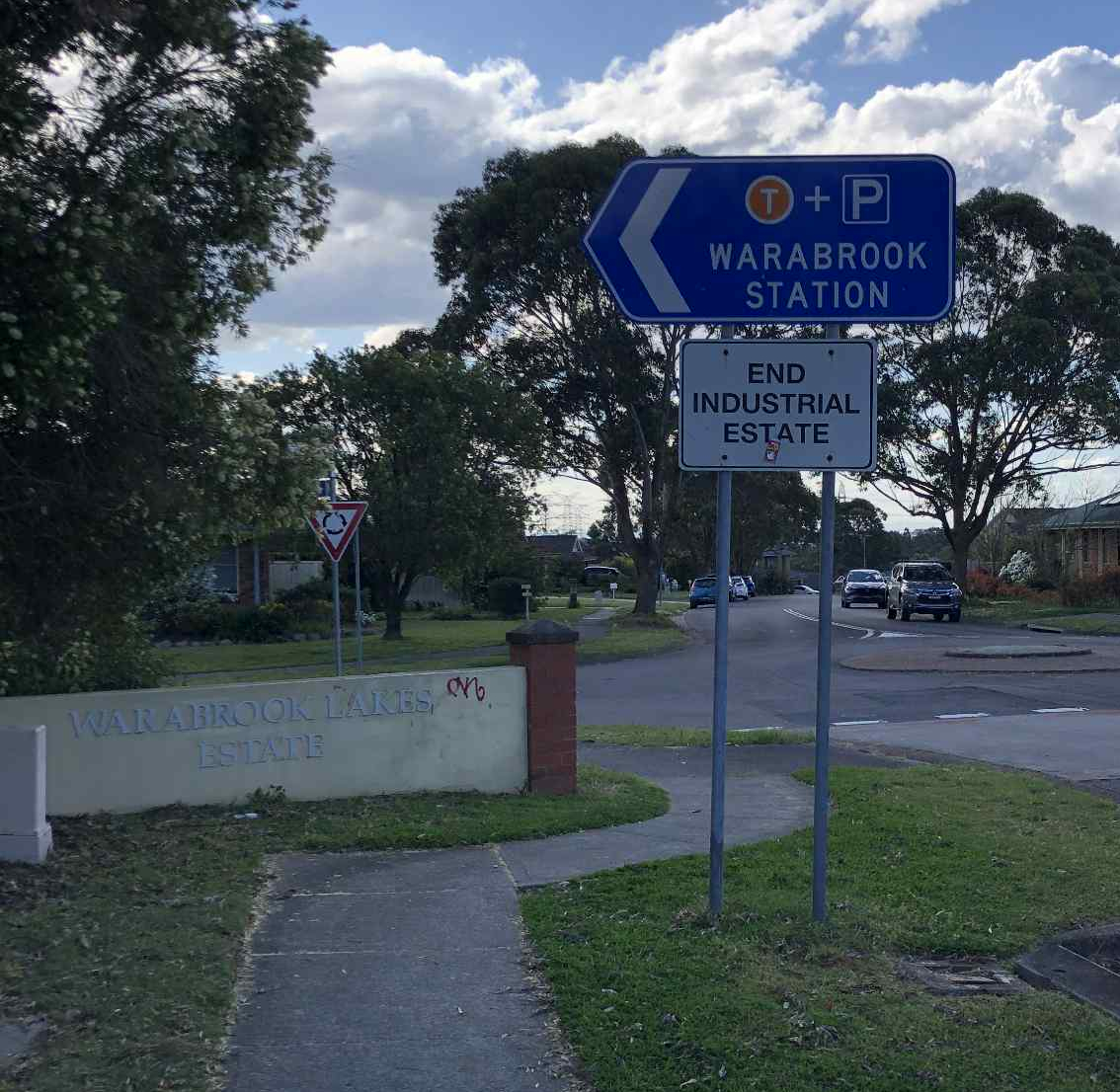
- An area of Warabrook showing a sign for the estate and towards the train station

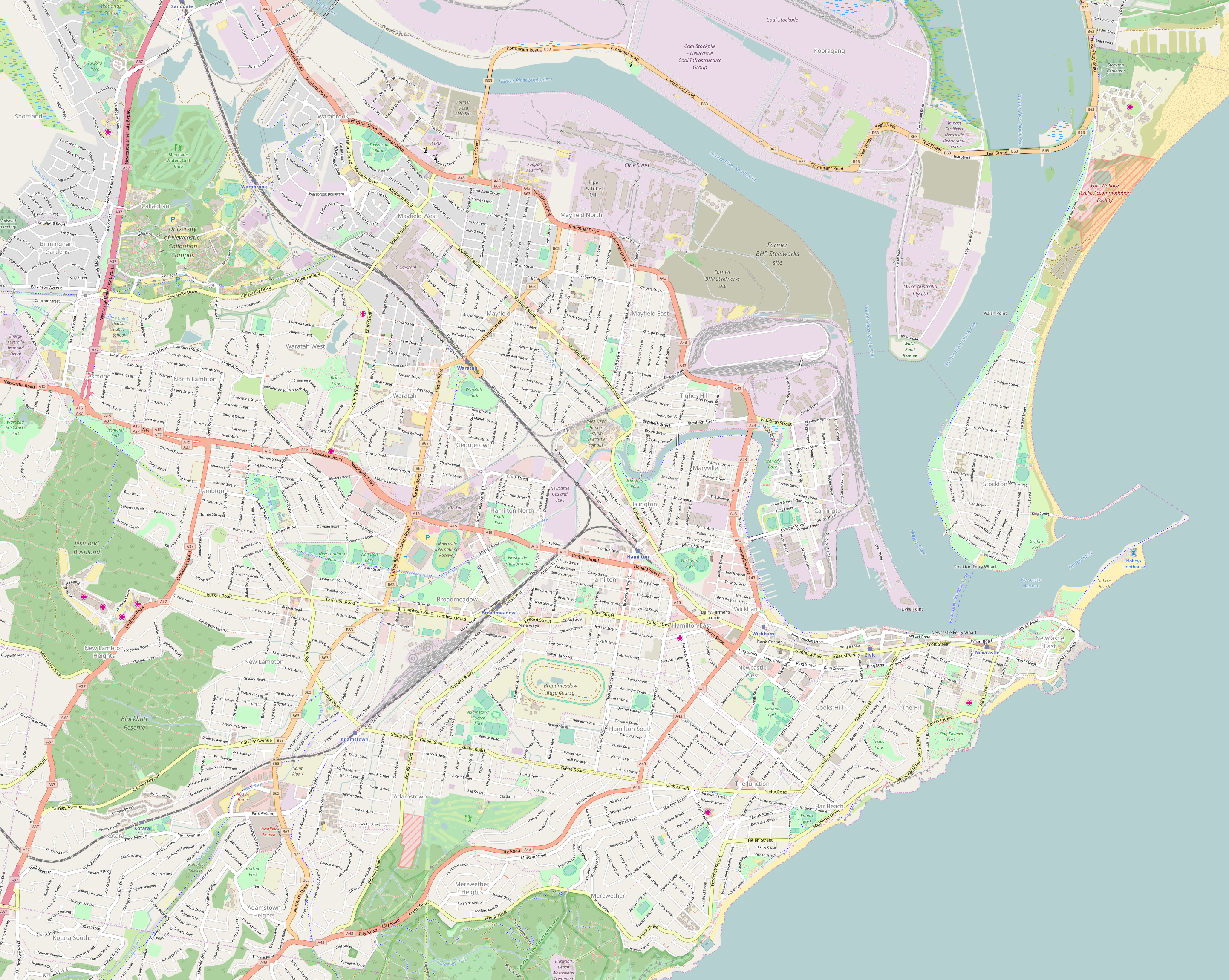
- Interactive map of Warabrook
- Coordinates: 32°52′54″S 151°43′4″E
- Country: Australia
- State: New South Wales
- City: Newcastle
- LGA: City of Newcastle
- Location: 8 km (5.0 mi) NW of Newcastle

Government
  - State electorate: Newcastle
  - Federal division: Newcastle

Area
  - Total: 1.5 km^{2} (0.58 sq mi)

Population
  - Total: 1,982 (SAL 2021)
- Postcode: 2304
- Parish: Newcastle
Suburbs around Warabrook
Sandgate	Sandgate	Mayfield West
Shortland	Warabrook	Mayfield West
Callaghan	Waratah West	Mayfield

Warabrook /ˈwɒrəˌbrʊk/ is a north-western suburb of Newcastle, New South Wales, Australia, located 8 kilometres (5 mi) from Newcastle's central business district. It is part of the City of Newcastle local government area. The suburb is primarily residential but also includes a shopping centre, an aged care facility and a light industrial area. Warabrook was originally a small agricultural base which had a cattleyard and abattoir. Warabrook has the Eucalyptus Circuit Reserve which has a cycle way and children's play equipment.

== Transport ==
Warabrook railway station opened in 1997 to serve the nearby University of Newcastle in Callaghan and Warabrook. The station is served by NSW TrainLink's Hunter Line. The railway line is part of the Newcastle-Maitland line, the first section of the Main North line from Sydney to the New England region, opened in 1857.

Warabrook is serviced by two bus routes between Jesmond and Newcastle.
