= Shortland, New South Wales =

Shortland
- Suburb
- Interactive map of Shortland
- Coordinates: 32°52′55″S 151°41′06″E
- Country: Australia
- State: New South Wales
- City: Newcastle
- LGA: City of Newcastle
- Location: 12 km (7.5 mi) NW of Newcastle; 3 km (1.9 mi) N of Jesmond

Government
  - State electorate: Wallsend
  - Federal division: Newcastle

Area
  - Total: 8.8 km^{2} (3.4 sq mi)

Population
  - Total: 4,537 (SAL 2021)
- Postcode: 2307
- Parish: Hexham
Suburbs around Shortland
Hexham	Hexham	Sandgate
Maryland	Shortland	Sandgate
Wallsend	Birmingham Gardens	Callaghan

Shortland is a suburb of Newcastle, New South Wales, Australia, located 12 kilometres (7.5 mi) from Newcastle's central business district. It is part of the City of Newcastle local government area.

== History ==
The Awabakal and Worimi peoples are acknowledged by City of Newcastle the traditional custodians of the land situated within the Newcastle local government area, including wetlands, rivers, creeks, and coastal environments. It is known that their heritage and cultural ties to Newcastle date back tens of thousands of years.

Shortland was named after Lt. John Shortland, master's mate of the Sirius, the escorting vessel to the First Fleet.

== Economic activities ==
The area is restricted in development growth due to surrounding wetlands.

== Hunter Wetlands Centre ==
The Hunter Wetlands Centre, established in 1984, is situated on 45 ha (110 acres) of rehabilitated wetlands between Shortland and Hexham Swamp. The Shortland Wetlands are part of the Ramsar Convention-recognised Hunter Estuary Wetlands, providing habitat for many species of birds and wildlife along with recreational and educational facilities for visitors.

Several unconfirmed "yowie" sightings have occurred in this area at the Wetlands.

== Facilities and landmarks ==
- The Hunter Valley Private Hospital is the oldest working private hospital in the Hunter area. It was established in 1965 and purchased by the Hunter Valley Private Hospital in 1985.
- Shortland RSL Memorial Grove is on Conmurra Circuit.

== Education ==
There are two primary schools in Shortland, Shortland Public School and Our Lady of Victories Catholic School both located on Sandgate Road.

Margaret Jurd College, originally a Ministry of the Uniting Church, provides students facing challenges in education an alternative secondary school option.

The University of Newcastle moved from Tighes Hill to the edge of the suburb in 1966. The site of the University was later absorbed into the suburb of Callaghan (named for Sir Bede Callaghan, University Chancellor 1977-1988).

== Sport and recreation ==
Recreational facilities include the Hunter Wetlands Centre, Shortland Waters Golf Course, netball courts, and sporting ovals. Parks and reserves include Tuxford Park, Alister Street Reserve, Northcote Park and Coral Sea Avenue Reserve.

== Transport ==
Sandgate Road is the main transport thoroughfare. Sandgate Road overpasses the Shortland to Sandgate section of the Newcastle Inner City Bypass, opened in 2014. Works on the environmentally sensitive Shortland to Sandgate section included a 1.9-kilometre dual carriageway, a 60-metre grade separated interchange, a signalised intersection, two bridges over Deepbridge Creek and two bridges over the Main Northern Railway. The project also included sediment basins to control run-off and provide habitat for the endangered green and golden bell frog.

Shortland is serviced by Newcastle Buses. The closest railway stations are Sandgate railway station and Warabrook railway station (University), on NSW TrainLink's Hunter Line.
