= Tourle Street Bridge =

- Carries: Tourle Street
- Crosses: Hunter River
- Locale: Kooragang, New South Wales
- Owner: Transport for NSW

Characteristics
- No. of lanes: 4

History
- Opened: 6 May 2009; June 2018 (duplicated)

The Tourle Street Bridge is a pair of road bridges that carry Tourle Street across the Hunter River from Mayfield West to Kooragang in Newcastle, New South Wales, Australia.

The original steel truss bridge opened on 20 February 1965. On 6 May 2009 a two-lane replacement concrete bridge opened immediately to the east overcoming restrictions on vehicle height with the original demolished.

In June 2018, a nearly identical northbound bridge opened on the site of the 1965 bridge with the 2009 built bridge becoming one way southbound.
