= Sandgate Flyover =

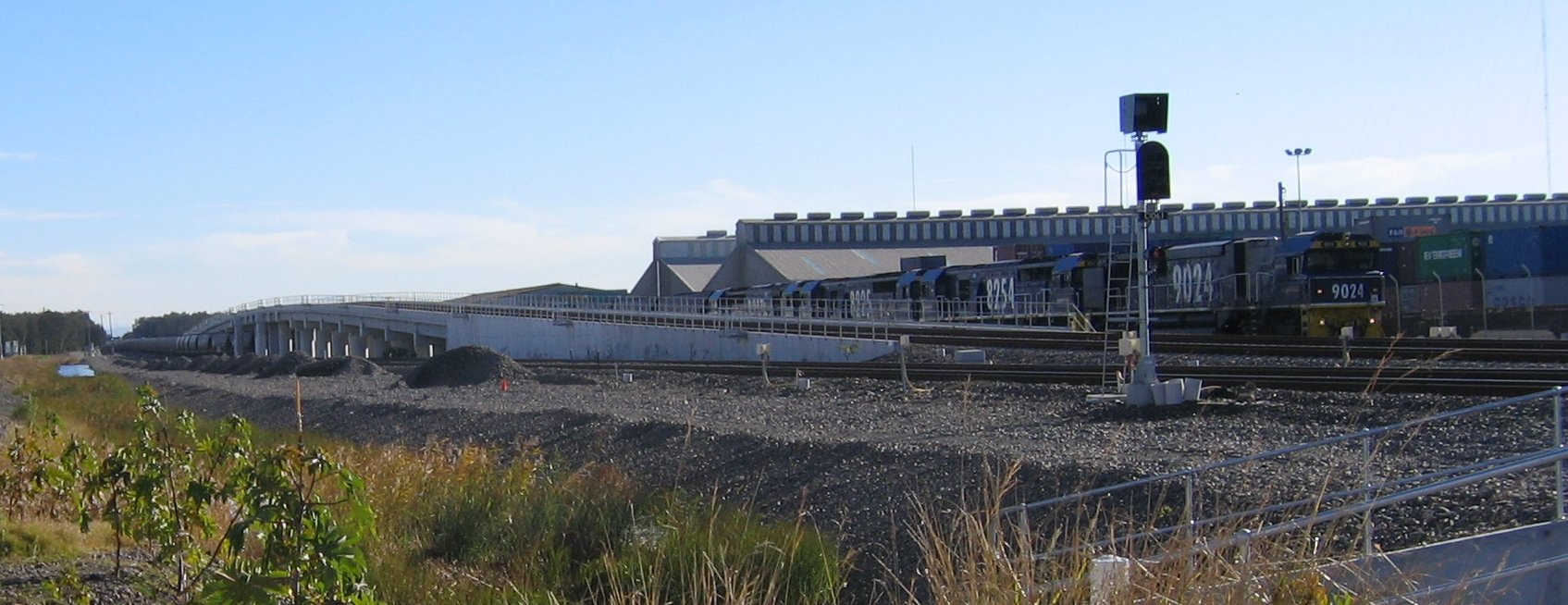
- The Sandgate Flyover, with a Kooragang-bound coal train passing underneath
- Coordinates: 32°52′19″S 151°42′10″E
- Carries: Main North Line
- Crosses: Kooragang Island line
- Locale: Sandgate, City of Newcastle, New South Wales, Australia
- Begins: Sandgate station (east)
- Ends: Ironbark Creek (west)
- Named for: Sandgate
- Owner: Transport Asset Manager of New South Wales
- Maintained by: Australian Rail Track Corporation

Characteristics
- Design: Grade-separated railway flyover
- Material: Prestressed concrete

Rail characteristics
- No. of tracks: 2
- Track gauge: 4 ft 8 1/2 in (1,435 mm) standard gauge

History
- Constructed by: John Holland Group; Arup Group; Union Switch & Signal
- Construction start: May 2006
- Construction cost: A$80 million
- Opened: 14 November 2006
- Inaugurated: 24 November 2006 by Mark Vaile, Deputy Prime Minister
- Replaces: At-grade junction

Location
- Interactive map of Sandgate Flyover

The Sandgate Flyover is a grade-separated railway flyover that carries the Main North Line across the Kooragang Island line, located in Sandgate, in the City of Newcastle local government area of New South Wales, Australia.

== Description ==
Situated to the west of the Sandgate station, the overpass was built in 2006 by the Australian Rail Track Corporation to allow coal trains to access the Port of Kooragang without conflicting with services on the Main North Line. The previous at-grade junction required that approximately 120 coal trains per day had to cross from the coal lines over the main lines to reach the branch line to the port. The main lines also carried about 120 trains per day. At the time of its construction, it was estimated that the project, once completed, would increase bulk coal handling capacity of between 15 and 20 million tonnes (17 and 22 million short tons) per annum.

At the time of the construction of the flyover, the main lines were raised over the junction of the coal lines to the Kooragang branch, so that the conflict between trains was eliminated. The junction improved line speeds with the 25 km/h (16 mph) points replaced by ones that allowed trains to operate at 60 km/h (37 mph). The flyover opened on 14 November 2006.

Adjacent to the flyover lies a siding used by Crawfords Freightlines.

== See also ==
- List of railway bridges in New South Wales
