= Callaghan, New South Wales =

Callaghan
- Suburb
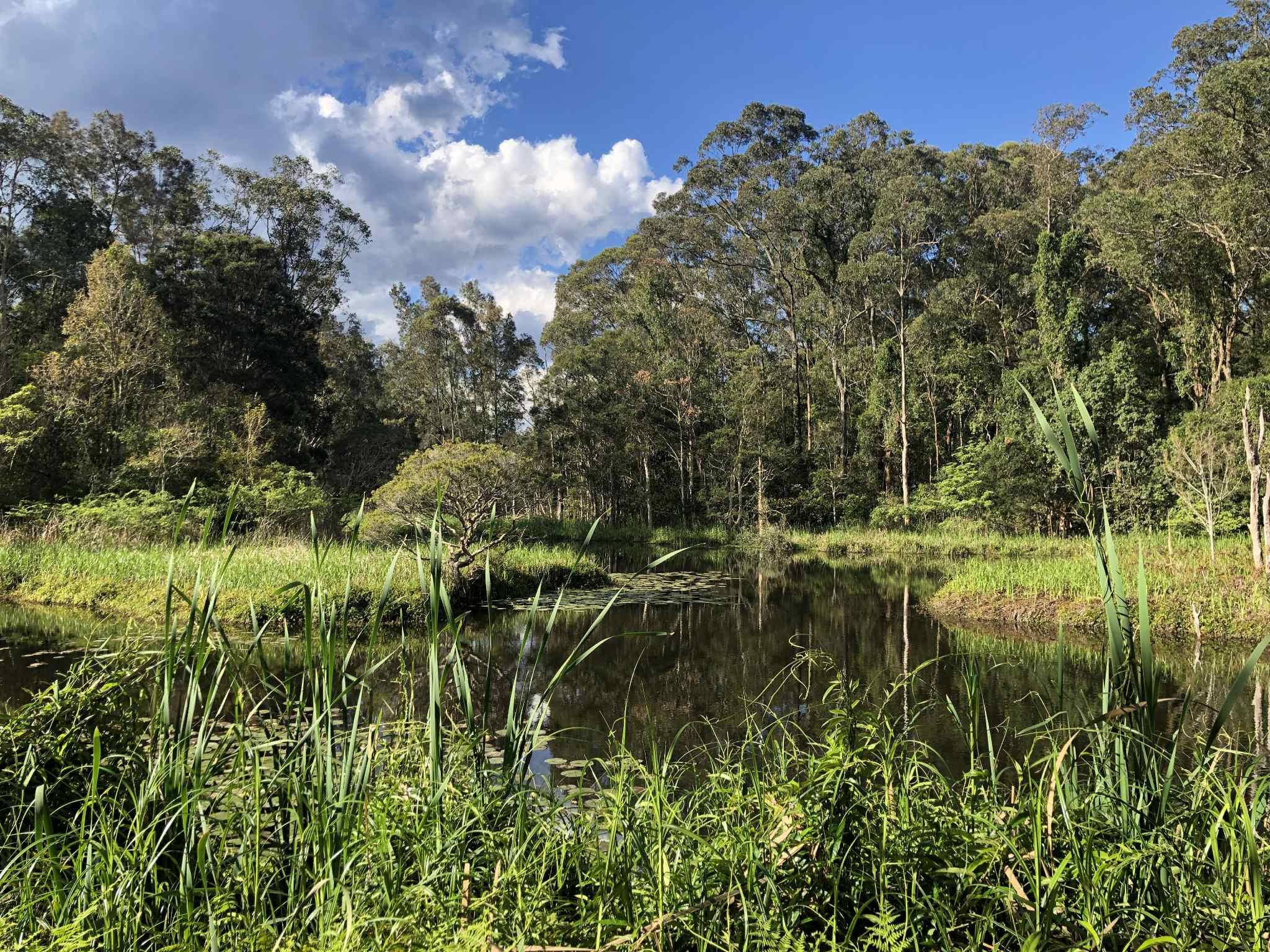
- Wetlands in Northern Callaghan

- Coordinates: 32°53′24″S 151°42′04″E
- Country: Australia
- State: New South Wales
- City: Newcastle
- LGA(s): City of Newcastle
- Location: 10 km (6.2 mi) WNW of Newcastle; 2 km (1.2 mi) NE of Jesmond; 24 km (15 mi) SE of Maitland; 61 km (38 mi) NNE of The Entrance; 153 km (95 mi) NNE of Sydney

Government
  - State electorate(s): Wallsend
  - Federal division(s): Newcastle
- Elevation: 44 m (144 ft)

Population
  - Total(s): 1,358 (SAL 2021)
- Postcode: 2308
- Parish: Newcastle
Suburbs around Callaghan
Shortland	Shortland	Warabrook
Birmingham Gardens	Callaghan	Warabrook
Jesmond	North Lambton	Waratah West

Callaghan (/kæləɡən/ KAL-ə-gən) is a suburb of Newcastle, New South Wales, Australia 10 kilometres (6 mi) from Newcastle's central business district. It contains the main campus of the University of Newcastle, which is the entirety of the suburb. It is served by Warabrook railway station on NSW TrainLink's Hunter Line.

Callaghan borders the suburbs of Shortland, Waratah West, and Warabrook.

== History ==
The Aboriginal people in this area, the Awabakal, were the first people of this land.

The suburb was named after Sir Bede Callaghan (1912–1993), who was Chancellor of the University of Newcastle from 1977 to 1988.

Callaghan had a population of 1,326 in 2016.

== Places ==
The Forum Sports and Aquatic Centre is located within the University of Newcastle and includes a number of sporting facilities – a heated indoor pool, five outdoor ovals and a gymnasium. It opened to general members of the public.
