= Church and Watt Street Terrace Group =

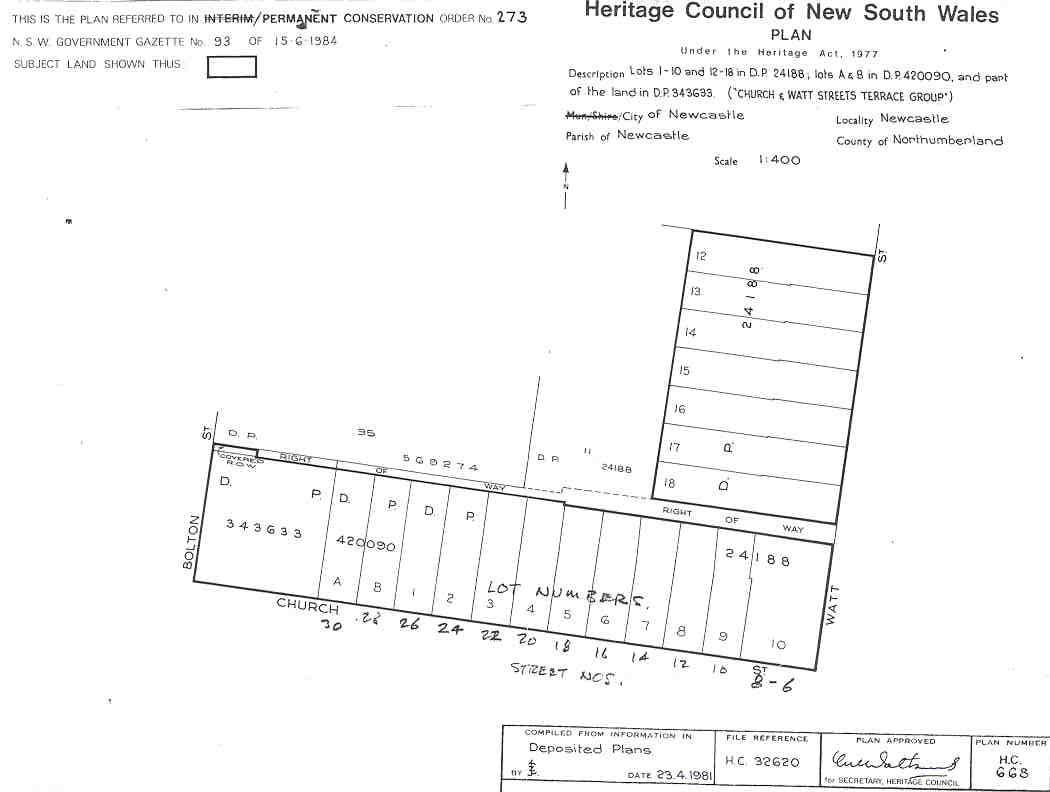
- Heritage boundaries

- Location within New South Wales Location within Australia
- 32.9299°S 151.7830°E
- Location: Church Street, Newcastle, City of Newcastle, New South Wales, Australia

Site notes
- Architectural style: Victorian Filigree
- Owner: Jejeep Pty Ltd; Johnpat Nominees Pty Ltd; Kiap Bros Transport Pty Ltd; Kiztwo Pty Ltd

New South Wales Heritage Register
- Official name: Church and Watt Street Terrace Group
- Type: state heritage (complex / group)
- Designated: 2 April 1999
- Reference no.: 273
- Type: Terrace
- Category: Residential buildings (private)

The Church and Watt Street Terrace Group is a heritage-listed precinct along Church and Watt Streets, Newcastle, New South Wales, Australia. It was added to the New South Wales State Heritage Register on 2 April 1999.

== Description ==
The precinct includes four neighbouring sites listed as constituent elements:

Grand Hotel at 32 Church Street
Buchanan Terraces at 10-30 Church Street
Macquarie House at 8 Church Street
Watt Street terraces at 50-62 Watt Street

== Heritage listing ==
The Church and Watt Street Terrace Group was listed on the New South Wales State Heritage Register on 2 April 1999.
