= Waratah railway station =

Railway station in New South Wales, Australia

Waratah
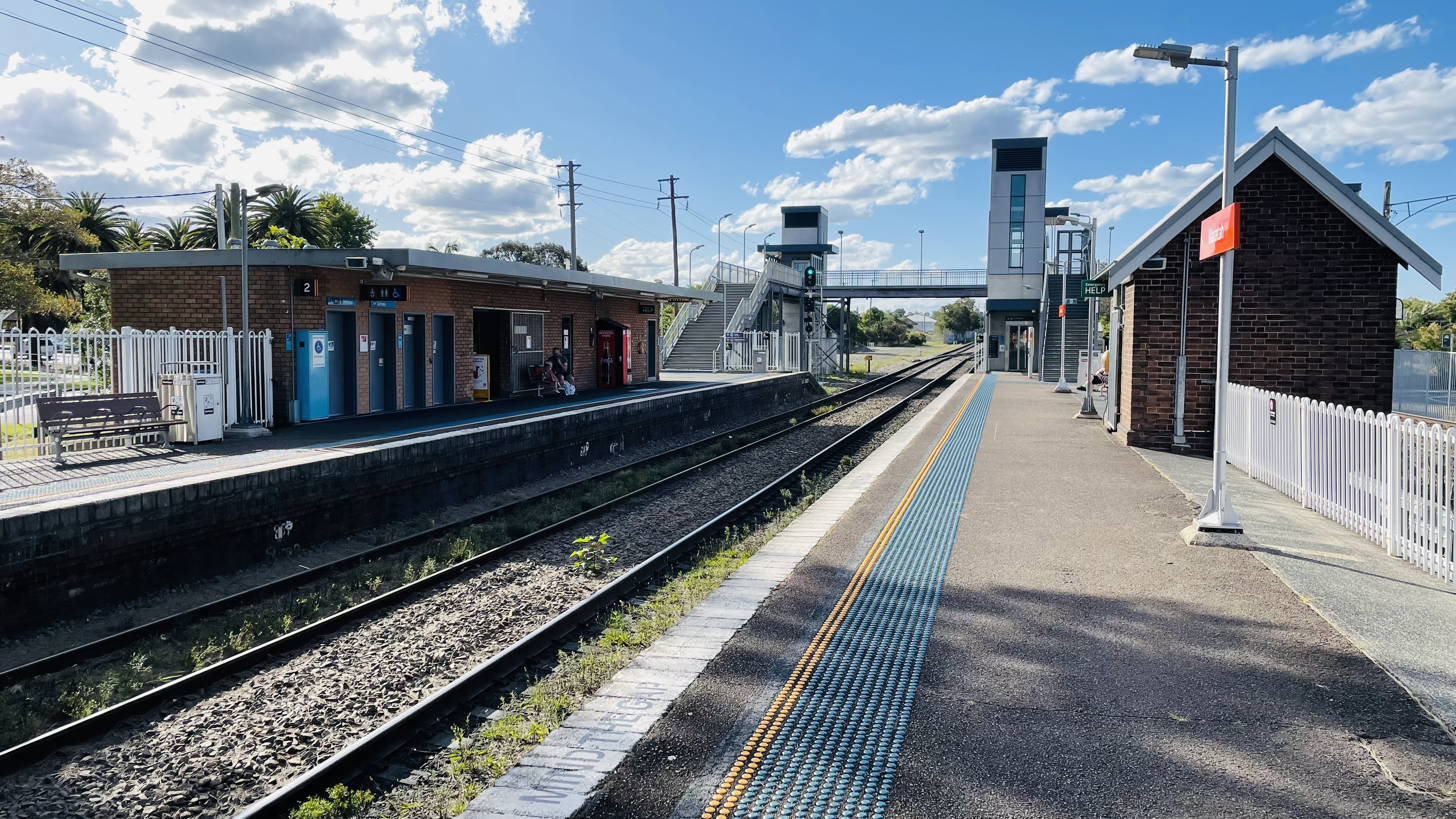
- Westbound view from Platform 1, November 2022

General information
- Location: Station Street, Waratah; Australia
- Coordinates: 32°54′09″S 151°43′53″E
- Owner: Transport Asset Manager of New South Wales
- Operator: Sydney Trains
- Line: Main Northern
- Distance: 165.96 kilometres (103.12 mi) from Central
- Platforms: 2 side
- Tracks: 4
- Connections: Bus

Construction
- Structure type: Ground
- Accessible: Yes

Other information
- Status: Weekdays: Staffed: 6 am–2 pm: Weekends and public holidays: Unstaffed
- Station code: WTH
- Website: Transport for NSW

History
- Opened: 9 March 1858; 168 years ago

Passengers
- 2025: 86,555 (year); 237 (daily) (Sydney Trains, NSW TrainLink)

Services
Preceding station	Intercity Trains	Following station
Warabrook towards Dungog or Scone	Hunter Line	Hamilton towards Newcastle Interchange
Location

Waratah railway station is a train station in Waratah, New South Wales, Australia and is located on the Main Northern railway line. It serves as the station for both Waratah and neighbouring suburb Mayfield. Waratah railway station is currently in use and has services to Newcastle Interchange, Hamilton, Maitland among others.

== History ==
Waratah railway station opened 9 March 1858, and since then has seen four different station buildings with the newest one being built in 1986. The original line was duplicated in 1864 and coal roads were constructed in 1914. It is suggested by early documents that Waratah was initially intended to be the transport to Sydney, New South Wales — the line was referred to as 'Homebush to Waratah Railway'.

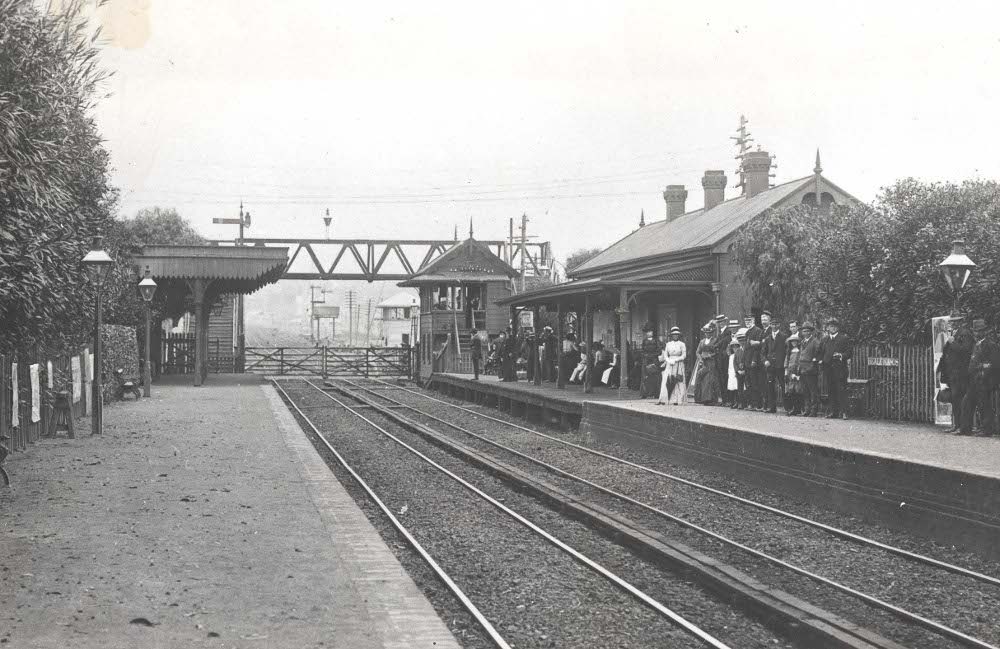
The station c.1910

== Platforms and services ==
Waratah has two side platforms. It is serviced by Sydney Trains Hunter Line services travelling from Newcastle to Maitland, Singleton, Muswellbrook, Scone, Telarah and Dungog. Waratah Station has a bridge accessed via stairs or lift which connects Waratah to Mayfield. It has a bathroom. It uses the Opal card system. There is a vending machine.

Platform	Line	Stopping pattern	Notes
1	HUN	services to Newcastle	
2	HUN	services to Maitland, Telarah, Dungog, Singleton, Muswellbrook and Scone	

== Transport links ==
Newcastle Transport operates one bus route via Waratah station, under contract to Transport for NSW — the 24: Wallsend to Marketown via Jesmond, University of Newcastle, Waratah, Carrington and Newcastle Interchange. Nearby stops have routes for the 12 and 27 services.

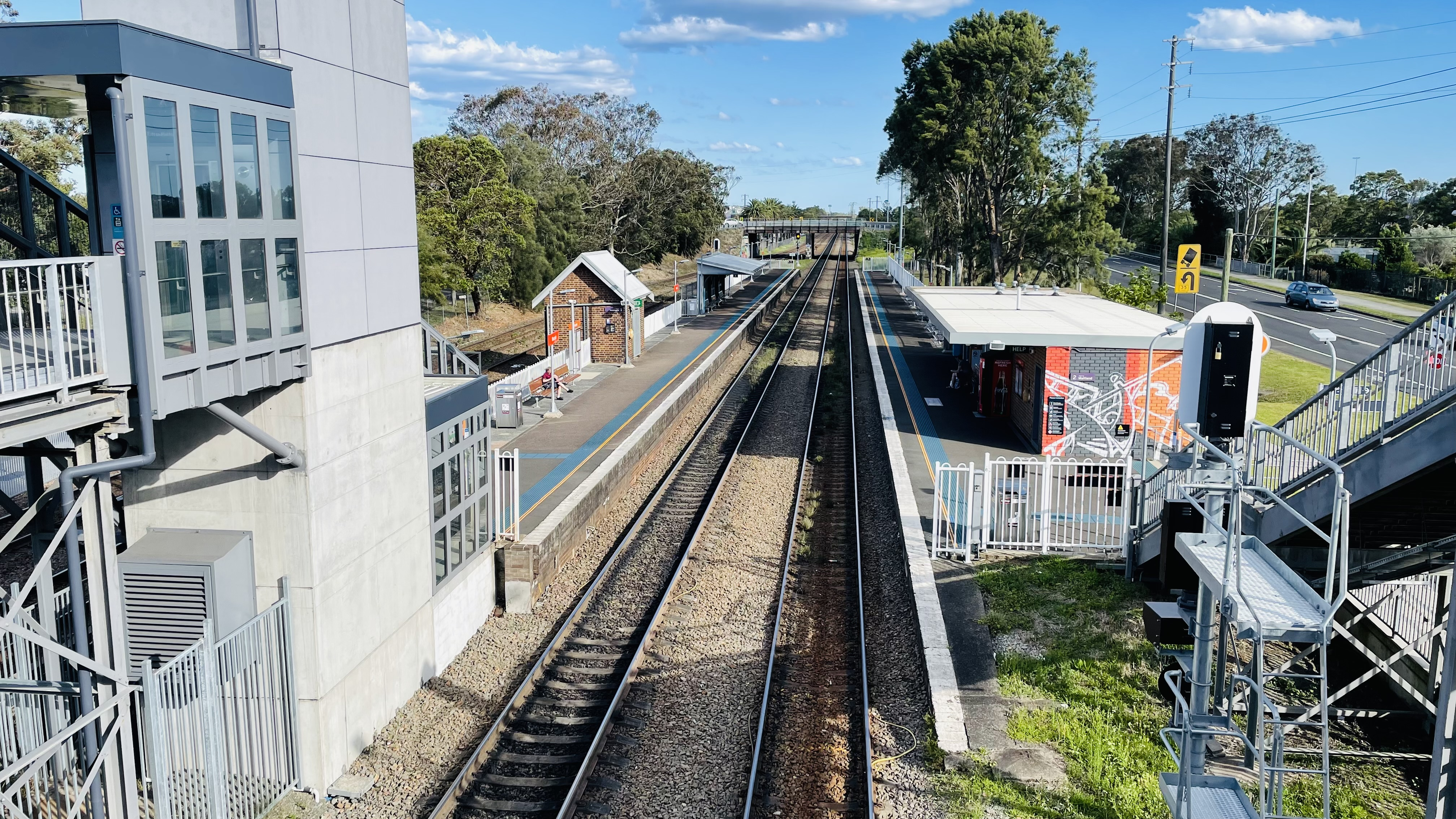
Looking east from the footbridge

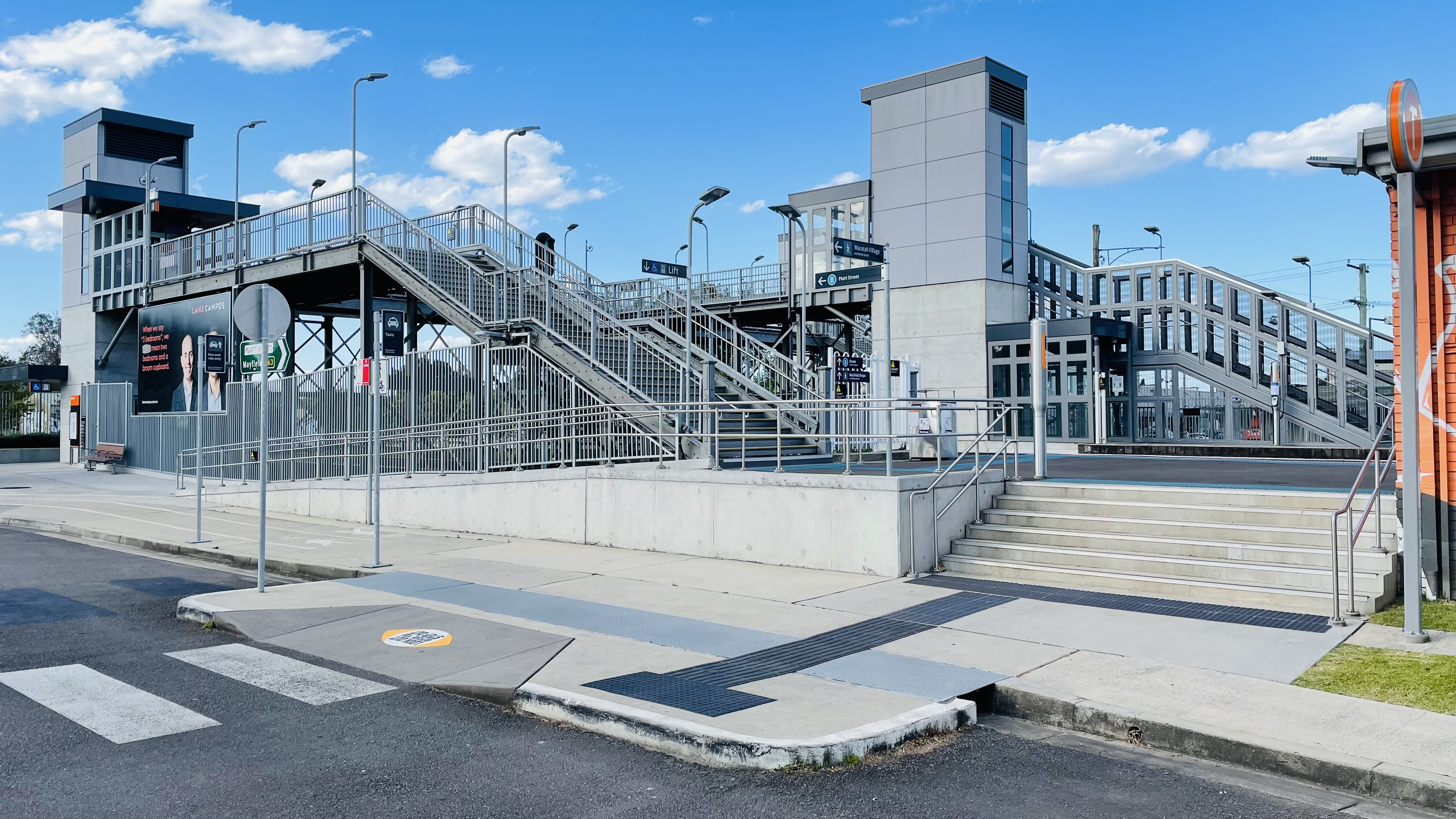
Entrance on Platt Street

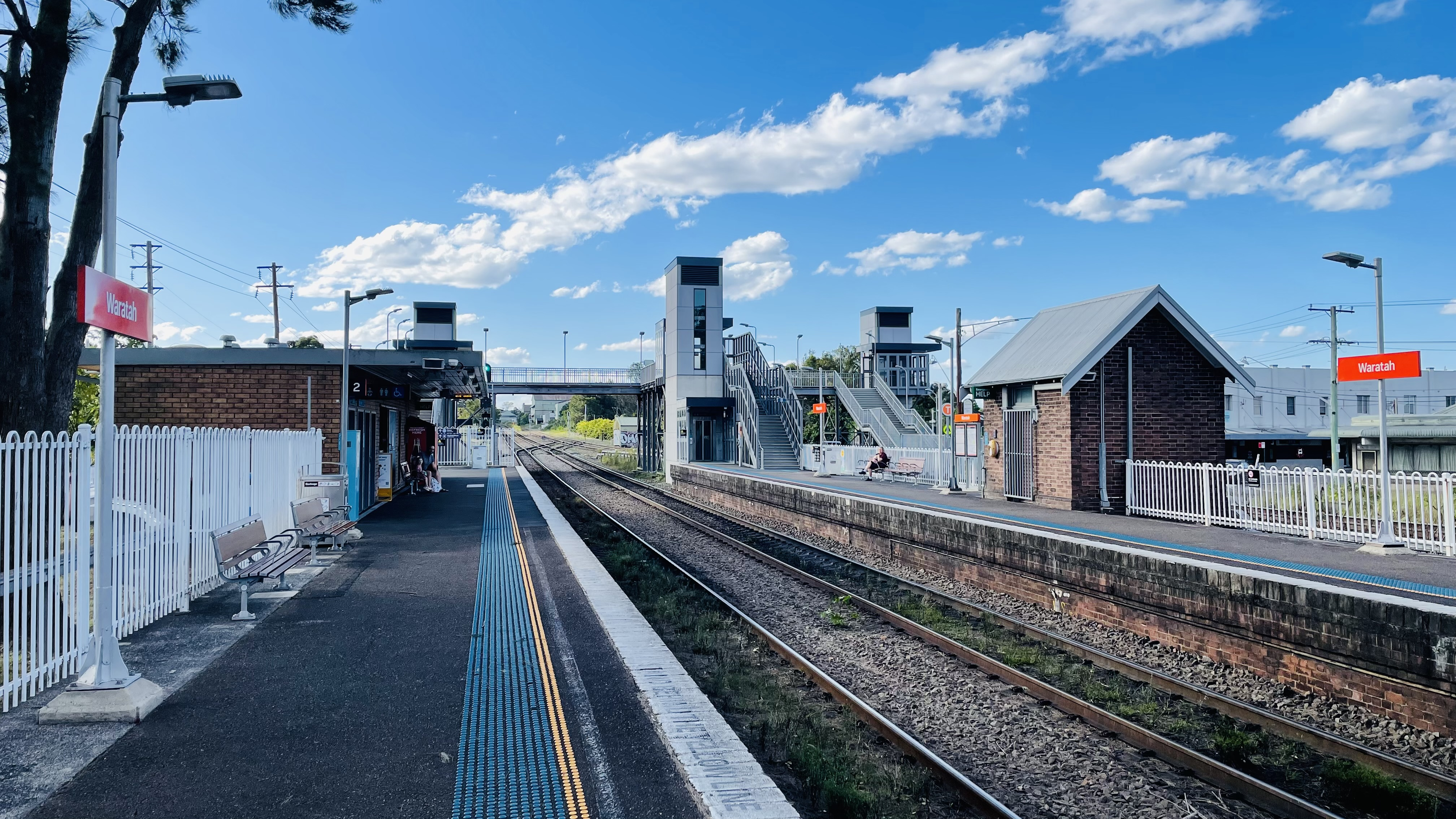
Platform 2
