= North Lambton =

- Suburb
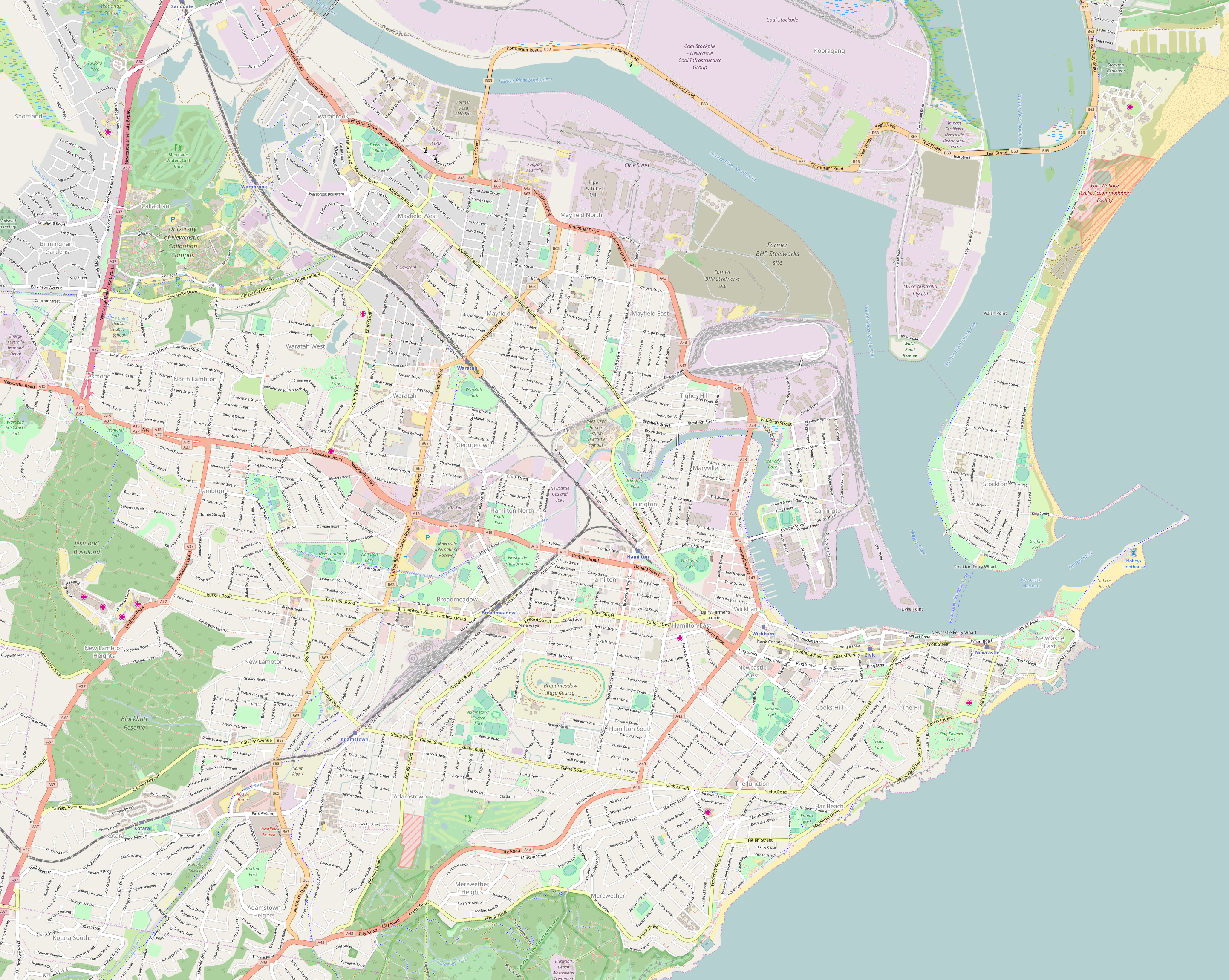
- Coordinates: 32°54′14″S 151°42′14″E
- Country: Australia
- State: New South Wales
- City: Newcastle
- LGA: City of Newcastle
- Location: 9 km (5.6 mi) WNW of Newcastle; 1 km (0.62 mi) E of Jesmond; 29 km (18 mi) SE of Maitland; 61 km (38 mi) N of The Entrance; 151 km (94 mi) NNE of Sydney

Government
  - State electorate: Wallsend
  - Federal division: Newcastle

Area
  - Total: 1.5 km^{2} (0.58 sq mi)
- Elevation: 52 m (171 ft)
- Postcode: 2299
- Parish: Newcastle
Suburbs around North Lambton
Birmingham Gardens	Callaghan	Waratah West
Jesmond	North Lambton	Waratah West
Jesmond	Lambton	Lambton

North Lambton is a suburb of Newcastle, New South Wales, Australia, located 9 kilometres (6 mi) from Newcastle's central business district. It is part of the City of Newcastle local government area. North Lambton is a mostly housed area close to the Lambton City Centre.
