= Mayfield West =

- Suburb
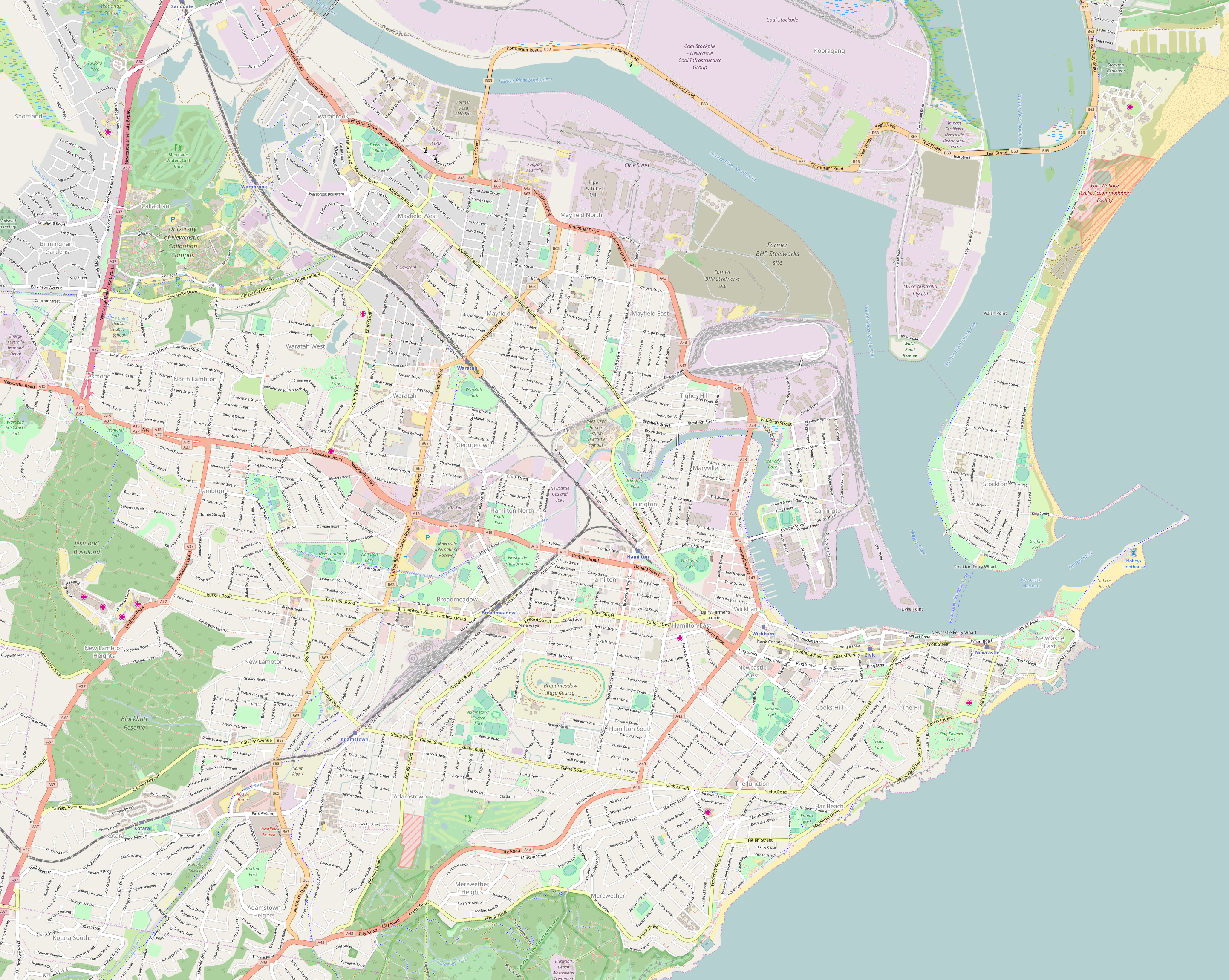
- Coordinates: 32°53′24″S 151°43′34″E
- Country: Australia
- State: New South Wales
- City: Newcastle
- LGA: City of Newcastle
- Location: 8 km (5.0 mi) NW of Newcastle
- Established: 1969

Government
  - State electorate: Port Stephens
  - Federal division: Newcastle

Area
  - Total: 2.4 km^{2} (0.93 sq mi)
- Postcode: 2304
- Parish: Newcastle
Suburbs around Mayfield West
Sandgate	Kooragang	Kooragang
Warabrook	Mayfield West	Mayfield North
Waratah West	Waratah	Mayfield

Mayfield West is a suburb of Newcastle, New South Wales, Australia, located 8 kilometres (5 mi) from Newcastle's central business district. It is part of the City of Newcastle local government area.

== History ==
The Aboriginal people, in this area, the Awabakal, were the first people of this land. One of the first European settlers was John Laurie Platt.
