= Birmingham Gardens =

- Suburb
- Coordinates: 32°52′55″S 151°39′54″E
- Country: Australia
- State: New South Wales
- City: Newcastle
- LGA: City of Newcastle
- Location: 11 km (6.8 mi) from Newcastle

Government
  - State electorate: Wallsend
  - Federal division: Newcastle

Area
  - Total: 0.7 km^{2} (0.27 sq mi)
- Postcode: 2287
Suburbs around Birmingham Gardens
	Shortland
Wallsend	Birmingham Gardens	Callaghan
Jesmond	Jesmond	North Lambton

Birmingham Gardens (/ˈbɜːrmɪŋhæm/ BUR-ming-ham) is a suburb of Newcastle, New South Wales, Australia, bordering the University of Newcastle 11 kilometres (7 mi) west-northwest of Newcastle's central business district. It is part of the City of Newcastle local government area.

Birmingham Gardens had a population of 2,376 in 2016.

== Origins ==
The Birmingham Gardens area was first subdivided in the 1930s. The area was expanded in the 1960s with the price of land being the attraction. The name Birmingham Gardens was given by Mr.T.M.Burke who originally subdivided the area after the English town of Birmingham. Originally owned by Newcastle Wallsend Coal Co & sold to Commonwealth Oil Refineries.

== Today ==
Birmingham Gardens, residents include a majority of people aged over 55 and a number of university students renting near the University of Newcastle. A few families now live in Birmingham Gardens. Birmingham Gardens also has Harold Myers Park which includes play equipment.
