= Sandgate, New South Wales =

Sandgate
- Suburb
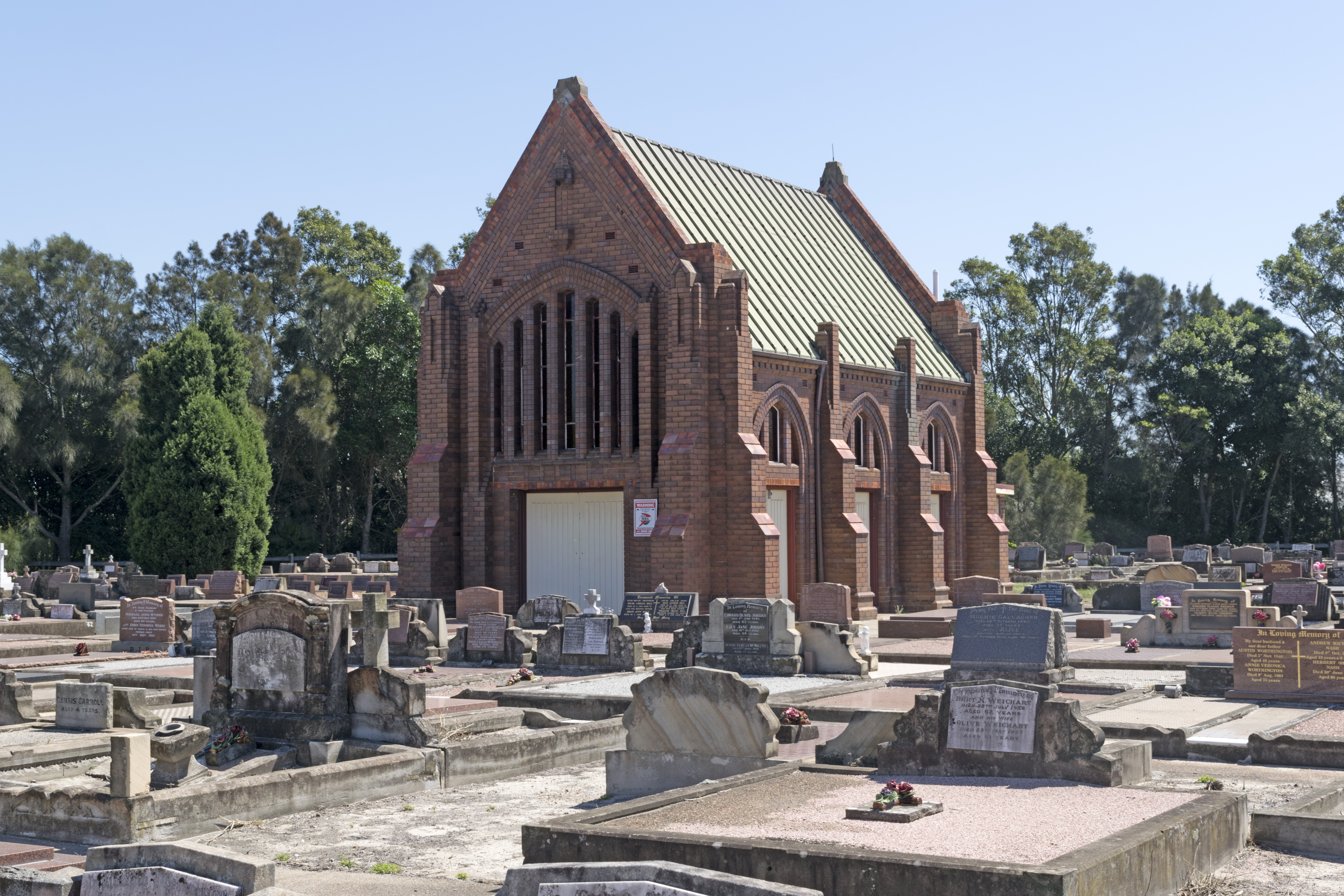

- Interactive map of Sandgate
- Coordinates: 32°52′4″S 151°42′22″E
- Country: Australia
- State: New South Wales
- City: Newcastle
- LGA: City of Newcastle
- Location: 11 km (6.8 mi) NW of Newcastle

Government
  - State electorate: Newcastle
  - Federal division: Newcastle

Area
  - Total: 2.3 km^{2} (0.89 sq mi)

Population
  - Total: 276 (SAL 2021)
- Postcode: 2304
- Parish: Newcastle
Suburbs around Sandgate
Hexham	Hexham	Kooragang Island
Shortland	Sandgate	Kooragang
Shortland	Warabrook	Mayfield West

Sandgate is a suburb of Newcastle, New South Wales, Australia, located 11 kilometres (6.8 mi) from Newcastle's central business district. It is part of the City of Newcastle local government area. The Awabakal and Worimi people were the first to live in Newcastle.

It has a railway station on the Hunter Line. Within the suburb is the largest cemetery in Newcastle, Sandgate Cemetery, which includes the now-derelict rail-head station, formerly used by funeral trains from Honeysuckle near Newcastle.

== See also ==
- Sandgate Cemetery
- Sandgate Flyover
