= Sandgate railway station, New South Wales =

Railway station in New South Wales, Australia

Sandgate
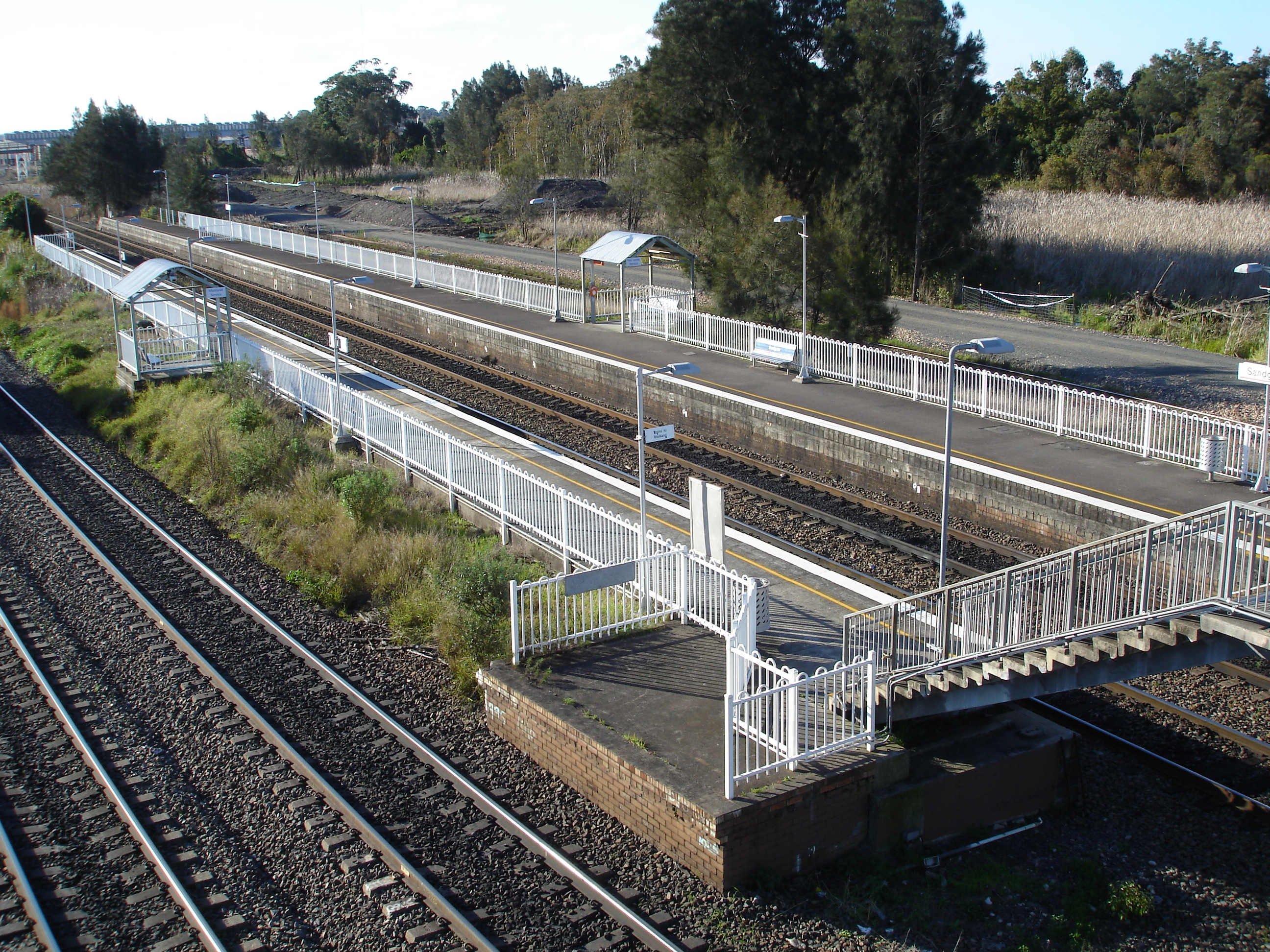
- Westbound view of the station platforms, August 2006

General information
- Location: Astra Street, Sandgate; Australia
- Coordinates: 32°52′19″S 151°42′10″E
- Owner: Transport Asset Manager of New South Wales
- Operator: Sydney Trains
- Line: Main Northern
- Distance: 170.51 kilometres (105.95 mi) from Central
- Platforms: 2 side
- Tracks: 6

Construction
- Structure type: Ground
- Accessible: No

Other information
- Station code: SDG
- Website: Transport for NSW

History
- Opened: 1881; 145 years ago
- Former names: Grant's Creek

Passengers
- 2025: 7,784 (year); 21 (daily) (Sydney Trains, NSW TrainLink)

Services
Preceding station	Intercity Trains	Following station
Hexham towards Telarah or Scone	Hunter Line	Warabrook towards Newcastle Interchange
Location

Sandgate railway station is located on the Main Northern line in New South Wales, Australia. It serves the western Newcastle suburb of Sandgate, opening in 1881 as Grant's Creek.

A one kilometre branch diverged behind the station in a north-westerly direction for Sandgate Cemetery. This closed on 13 October 1985. Following the completion of the Sandgate Flyover in November 2006, Sandgate station is flanked by two coal lines on either side.

== Platforms and services ==
Sandgate has two side platforms. It is serviced by Sydney Trains Intercity Hunter Line services travelling between Newcastle, Maitland and Telarah on an hourly basis. It is also service by one early morning service to Scone.

Platform	Line	Stopping pattern	Notes
1	HUN	services to Newcastle	
2	HUN	services to Maitland & Telarah	1 early morning service to Scone

== Trackplan ==
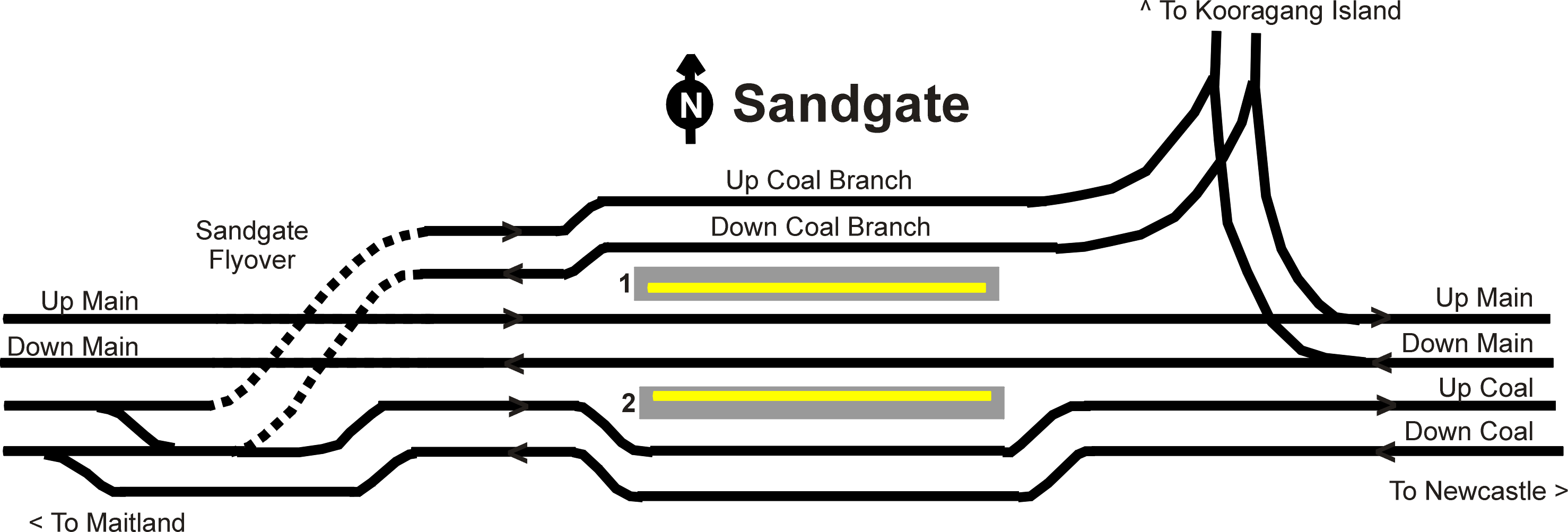
Track layout following the construction of the Sandgate Flyover
