= Waratah West =

- Suburb
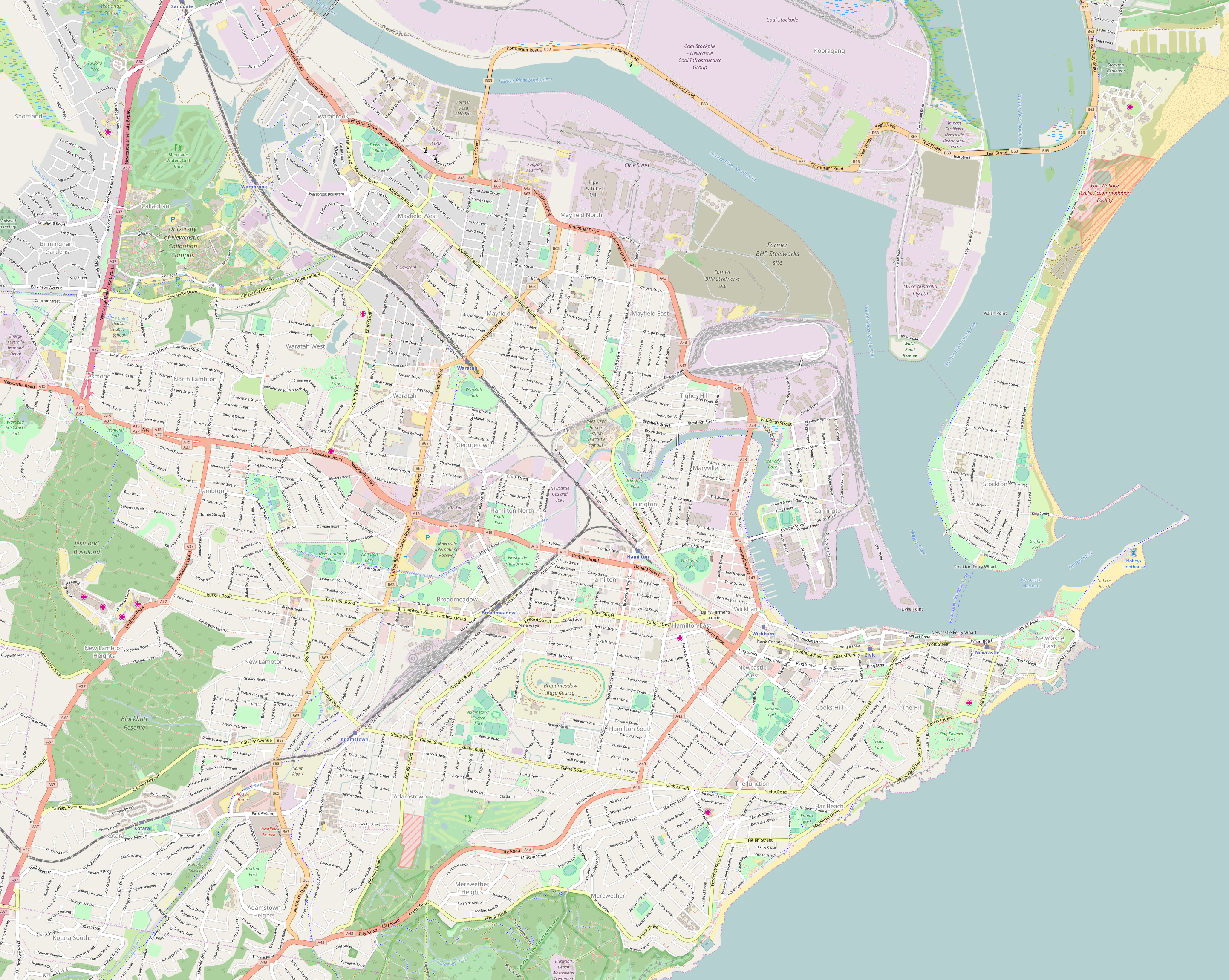
- Coordinates: 32°54′4″S 151°42′54″E
- Country: Australia
- State: New South Wales
- City: Newcastle
- LGA: City of Newcastle
- Location: 8 km (5.0 mi) WNW of Newcastle

Government
  - State electorate: Wallsend
  - Federal division: Newcastle

Area
  - Total: 1.4 km^{2} (0.54 sq mi)
- Postcode: 2298
- Parish: Newcastle
Suburbs around Waratah West
Callaghan	Warabrook	Mayfield
North Lambton	Waratah West	Waratah
North Lambton	Lambton	Waratah

Waratah West is a suburb of Newcastle, New South Wales, Australia, located 8 kilometres (5 mi) from Newcastle's central business district. It is part of the City of Newcastle local government area.

== History ==
The Aboriginal people, in this area, the Awabakal, were the first people of this land.

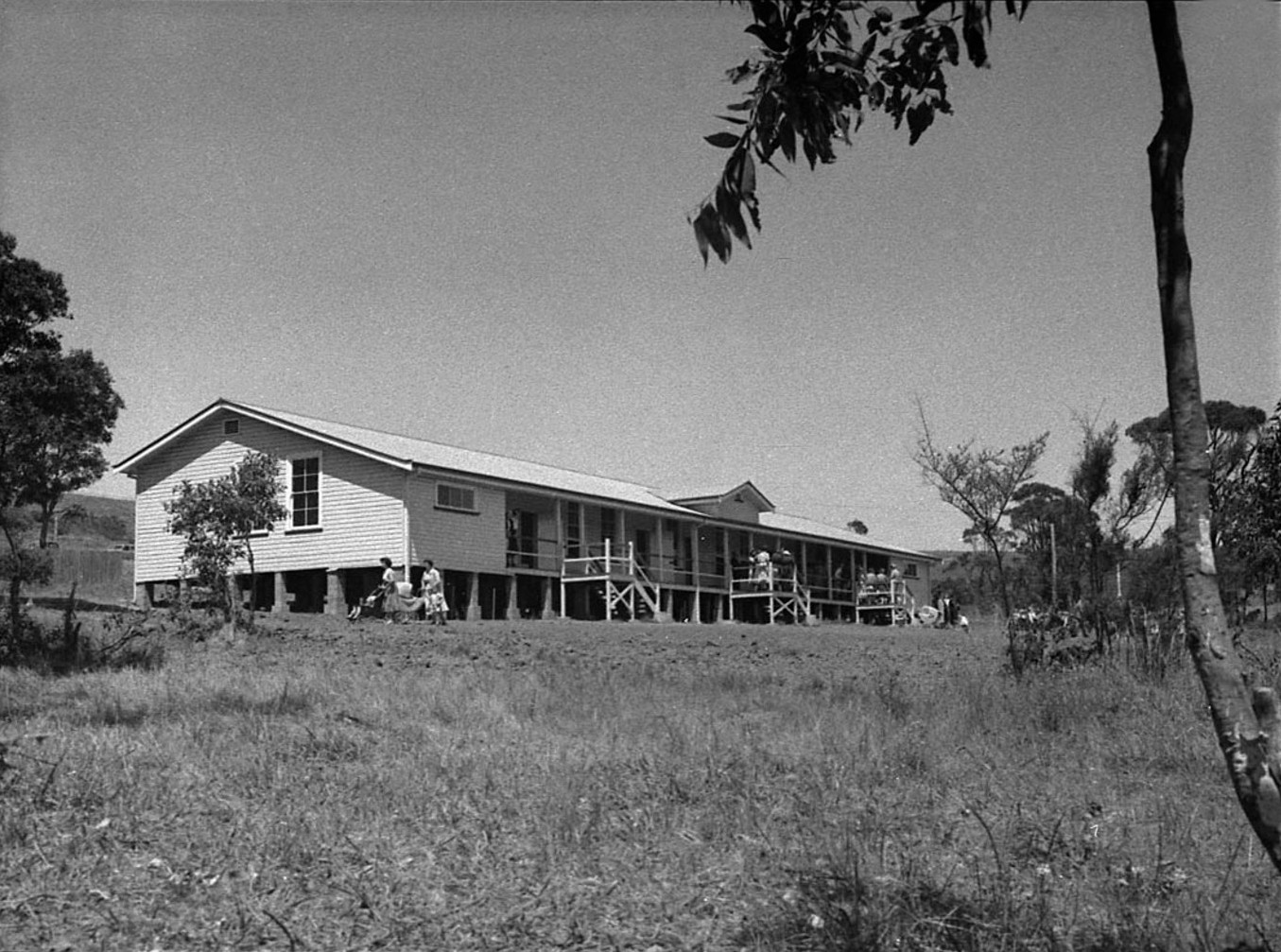
School at Waratah West in 1955

== Today ==
Waratah West Public School is a co-ed government primary located on 22 Leonora Parade.
