= Warabrook railway station =

Railway station in New South Wales, Australia

Warabrook
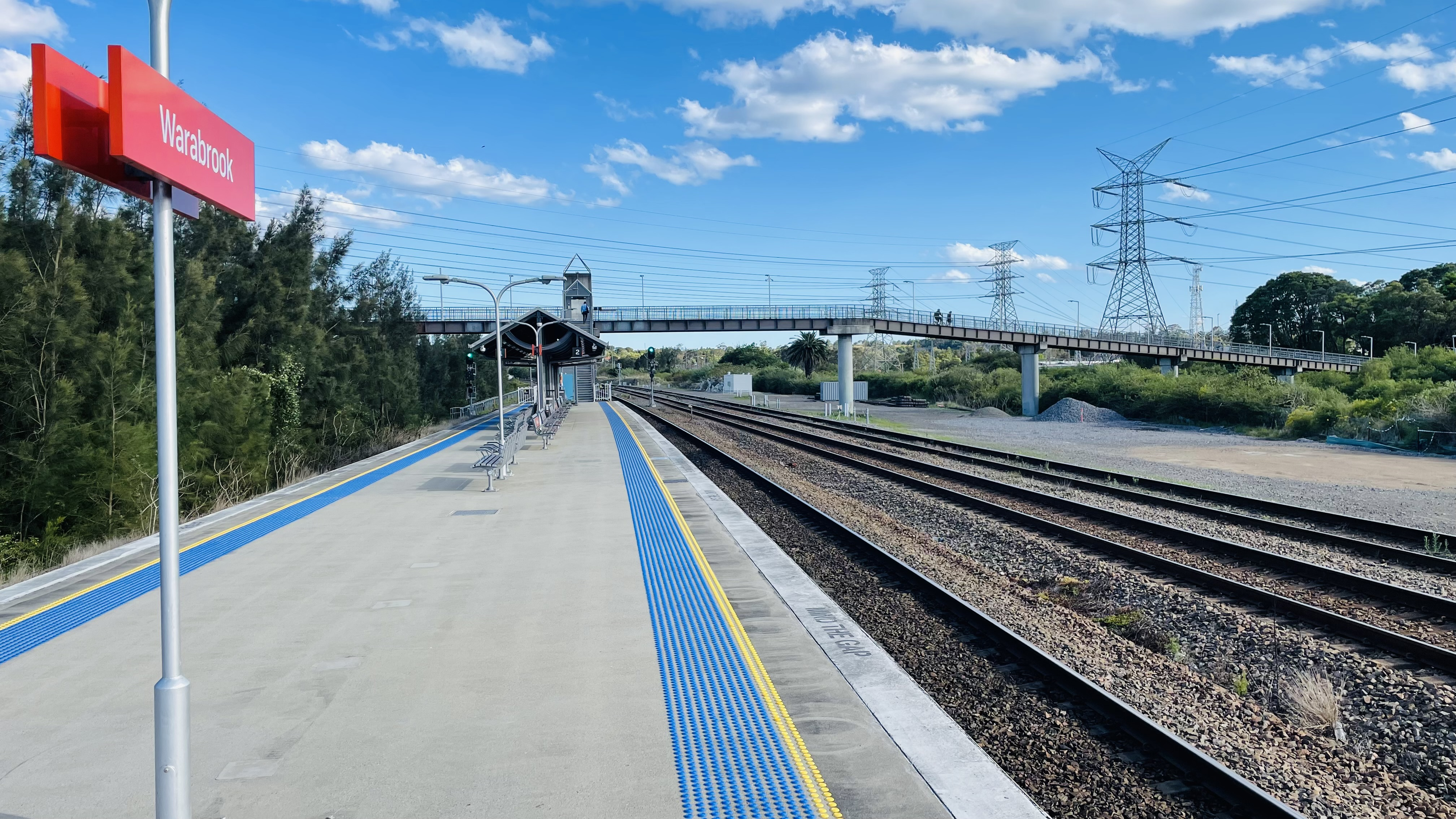
- Eastbound view, November 2022

General information
- Location: Warabrook Boulevard, Warabrook; Australia
- Coordinates: 32°53′14″S 151°42′36″E
- Owner: Transport Asset Manager of New South Wales
- Operator: Sydney Trains
- Line: Main Northern
- Distance: 168.69 kilometres (104.82 mi) from Central
- Platforms: 2 (1 island)
- Tracks: 4

Construction
- Structure type: Ground
- Accessible: Assisted access

Other information
- Station code: WBK
- Website: Transport for NSW

History
- Opened: 23 October 1995; 30 years ago
- Former names: Warabrook (University)

Passengers
- 2025: 106,792 (year); 293 (daily) (Sydney Trains, NSW TrainLink)

Services
Preceding station	Intercity Trains	Following station
Sandgate towards Telarah or Scone	Hunter Line	Waratah towards Newcastle Interchange
Beresfield towards Dungog or Scone	Hunter Line	Waratah towards Newcastle Interchange
Location

Warabrook railway station is located on the Main Northern line in New South Wales, Australia. It was opened on 23 October 1995, and serves the western Newcastle suburb of Warabrook and the University of Newcastle.

== Platforms and services ==
Warabrook has one island platform with two faces. It is serviced by Sydney Trains Hunter Line services travelling from Newcastle to Maitland, Singleton, Muswellbrook, Scone, Telarah and Dungog.

Platform	Line	Stopping pattern	Notes
1	HUN	services to Newcastle	
2	HUN	services to Maitland, Telarah, Dungog, Singleton, Muswellbrook & Scone	

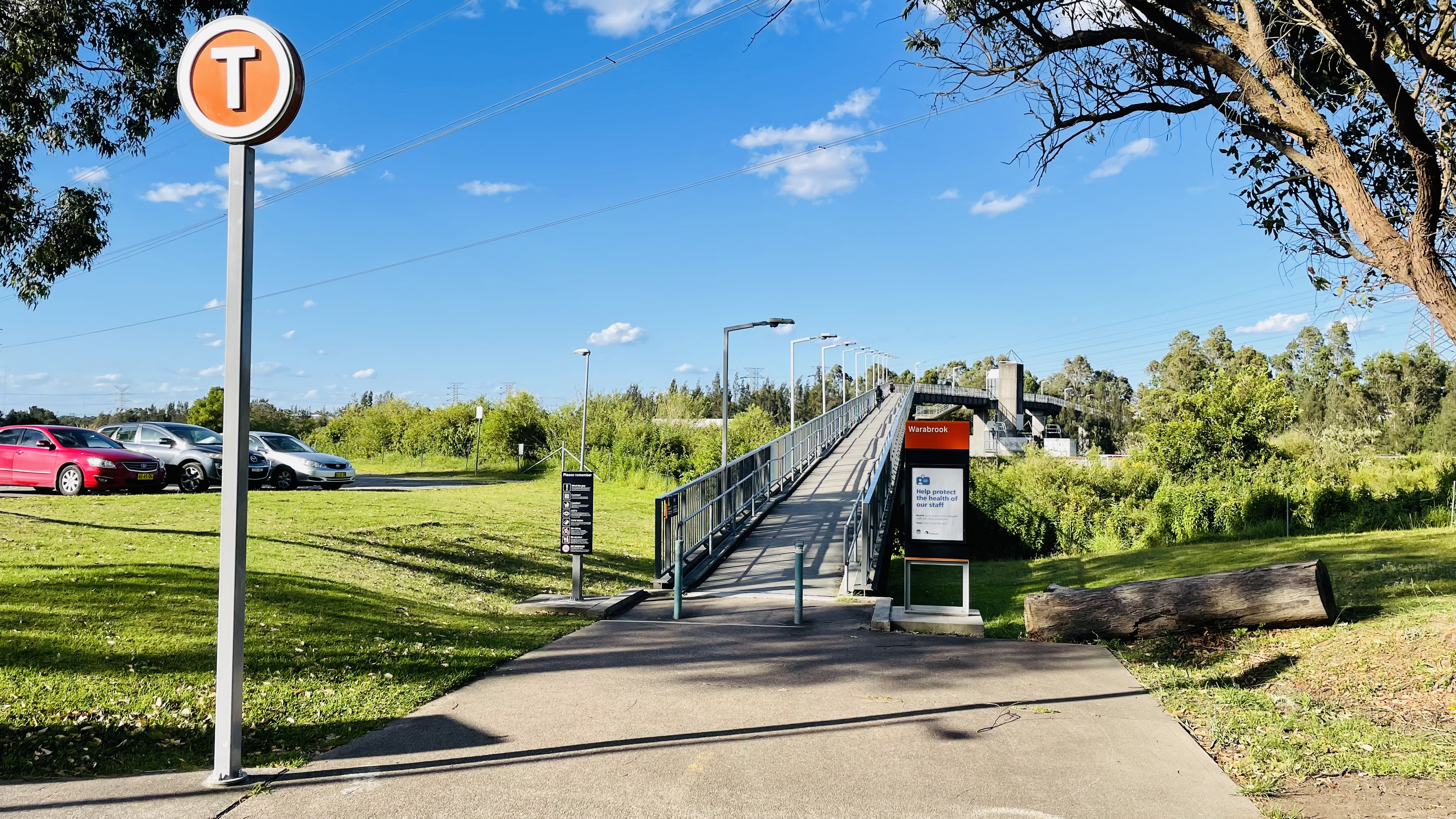
Entrance from University

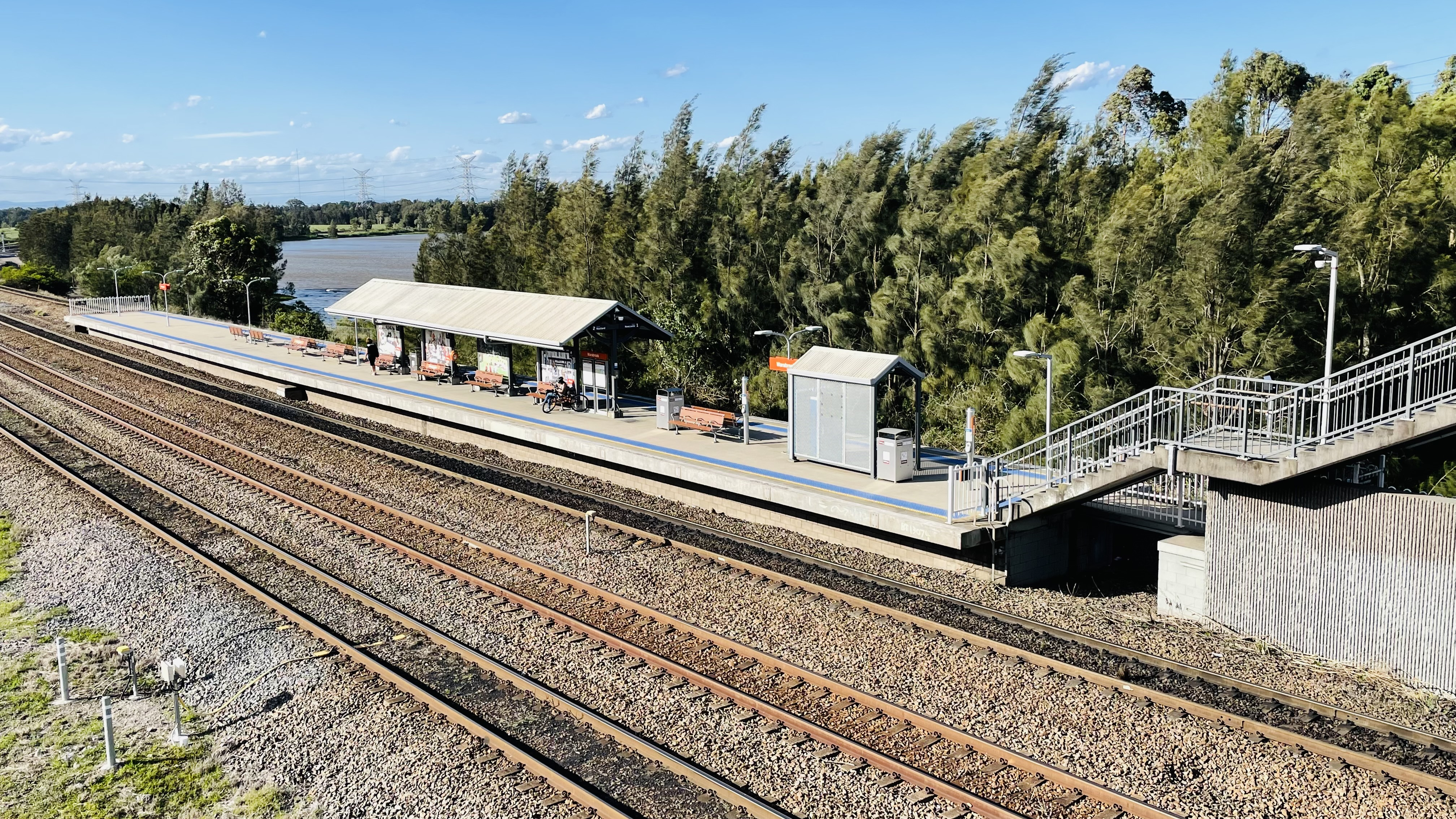
Platforms viewed from footbridge
