= City of Newcastle =

- Local government area
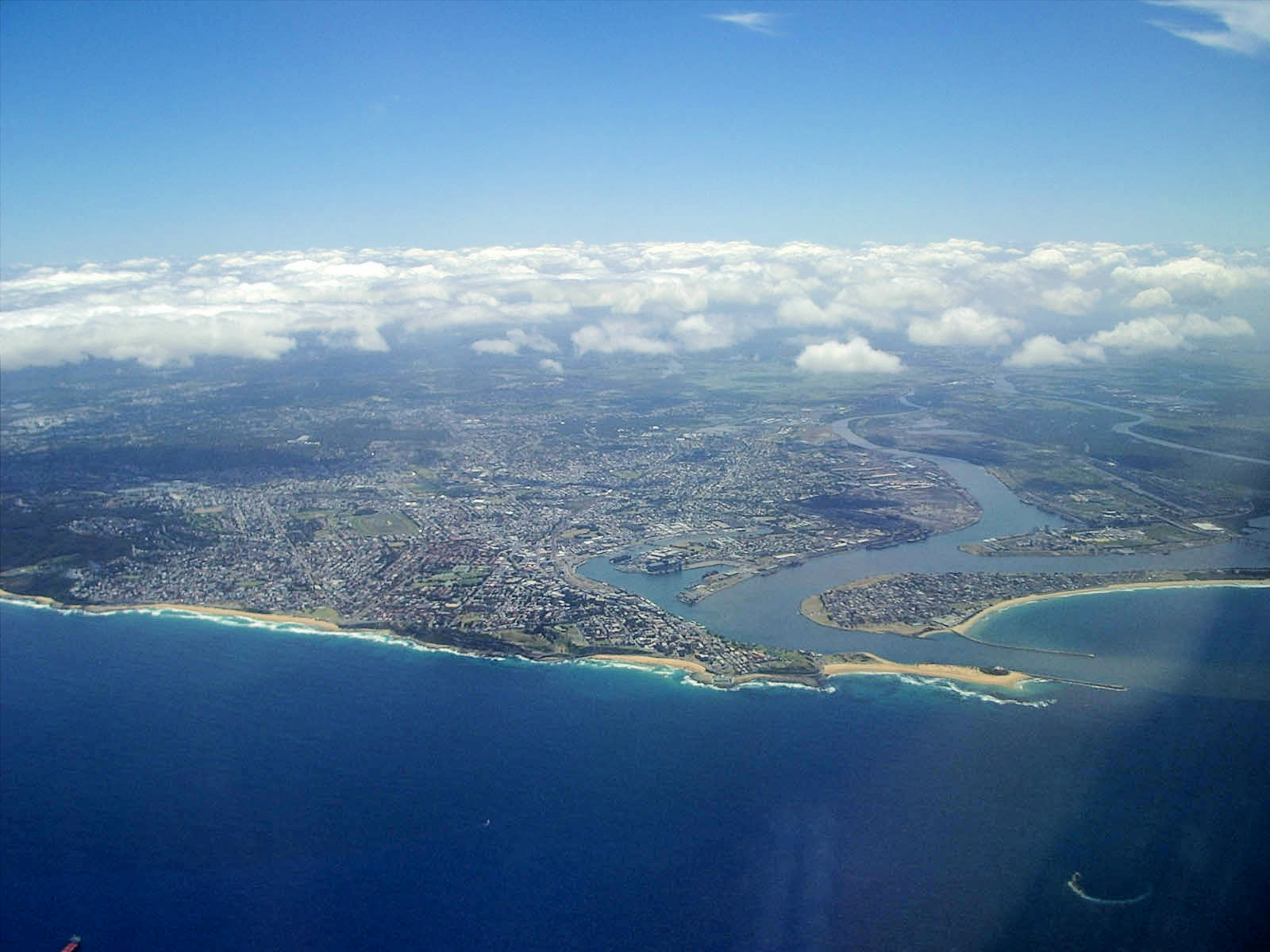
- Location in Greater Newcastle Aerial view of Newcastle

- Interactive map of City of Newcastle
- Coordinates: 32°55.7′S 151°46.9′E
- Country: Australia
- State: New South Wales
- Region: Hunter (Greater Newcastle)
- Location: 162 km (101 mi) NNE of Sydney
- Council seat: 12 Stewart Avenue, Newcastle West

Government
  - Lord Mayor: Gavin Morris (Independent)
  - State electorates: Newcastle; Wallsend; Charlestown; Port Stephens
  - Federal division: Newcastle

Area
  - Total: 186.8 km^{2} (72.1 sq mi)

Population
  - Total: 168,873 (LGA 2021) ([[List of cities in Australia by population|39th]])
  - Density: 918.1/km^{2} (2,378/sq mi)
- Time zone: UTC+10 (AEST)
  - Summer (DST): UTC+11 (AEDT)
- County: Northumberland
- Website: City of Newcastle
LGAs around City of Newcastle
Maitland	Port Stephens	Port Stephens
Cessnock	City of Newcastle	Tasman Sea
Lake Macquarie	Lake Macquarie	Tasman Sea

The City of Newcastle is a local government area in the Hunter region of New South Wales, Australia. The City of Newcastle incorporates much of the area of the Newcastle metropolitan area.

The Lord Mayor-elect of the City of Newcastle Council is Gavin Morris, an Independent politician elected at a by-election in April 2026.

== History ==
The Awabakal and Worimi peoples are acknowledged by council as the traditional custodians of the land and waters of Newcastle.

=== Municipality of Newcastle ===
Following the passing of the Municipalities Act 1858 by the New South Wales parliament, the Municipality of Newcastle was proclaimed on 7 June 1859. The new Municipality was divided into three wards – City, Macquarie, and Honeysuckle. Eight years later, the Municipalities Act 1867 classified the Newcastle Municipality as a "Borough".

=== Creation of modern council ===
The Greater Newcastle Act 1937 merged the City of Newcastle with 10 of its suburban municipalities to form the City of Greater Newcastle. The Act also transferred parts of the Lake Macquarie Shire and Tarro Shire to the new city. The amalgamations and transfers took effect from 2 April 1938.

The newly created City of Greater Newcastle was subsequently renamed to City of Newcastle on 23 March 1949.

Municipality	Date established	Population			
Municipality	Date established	1891	1901	1911	1921
Adamstown	31 December 1885	2,030	2,420	2,660	3,959
Carrington	28 March 1887	2,137	2,547	2,685	3,115
Hamilton	11 December 1871	4,844	6,124	7,908	14,196
Lambton	26 June 1871	3,436	3,159	2,796	3,691
Merewether	20 August 1885	4,399	4,547	4,151	5,908
New Lambton	1 August 1889	1,548	1,578	1,827	3,550
Stockton	12 October 1889	2,417	2,549	2,106	4,598
Wallsend	27 February 1874	6,945	6,997	6,007	6,446
Waratah	23 February 1871	2,718	3,080	4,419	12,192
Wickham	25 February 1871	6,582	7,752	8,434	12,151

=== 21st Century proposed amalgamation ===
After a 2015 review by the NSW Government Independent Pricing and Regulatory Tribunal found that Newcastle City Council was not "fit for the future", it was recommended that the City of Newcastle merge with Lake Macquarie City Council. However, the Minister for Local Government subsequently proposed that Newcastle City Council instead merge with Port Stephens Council to form a new council with an area of 1,045 km^{2} (403 sq mi) and support a population of approximately 230,000. The outcome of an independent review was completed by mid–2016. On 14 February 2017, the NSW Government announced it would not be proceeding with further regional council mergers, including the Newcastle City Council and Port Stephens Council merger.

== Suburbs, towns and villages ==
The towns and villages in the City of Newcastle are split into four wards – Ward 1, Ward 2, Ward 3, Ward 4. These include:

Ward 1

- Carrington
- Cooks Hill (Note: Shared with Ward 2.)
- Islington
- Maryville
- Mayfield
- Mayfield East
- Mayfield North
- Mayfield West
- Newcastle
- Newcastle East
- Newcastle West
- Stockton
- The Hill
- Tighes Hill
- Warabrook
- Wickham

Ward 2

- Adamstown
- Adamstown Heights (Note: Shared with Lake Macquarie City Council.)
- Bar Beach
- Broadmeadow
- Cooks Hill (Note: Shared with Ward 1.)
- Hamilton
- Hamilton East
- Hamilton South
- Kotara (Note: Shared with Ward 3.)
- Merewether
- Merewether Heights
- Newcastle West
- The Junction

Ward 3

- Birmingham Gardens
- Callaghan
- Georgetown
- Jesmond
- Hamilton North
- Kotara
- Lambton
- New Lambton
- New Lambton Heights
- North Lambton
- Rankin Park
- Wallsend (Note: Shared with Ward 4.)
- Waratah
- Waratah West

Ward 4

- Beresfield
- Black Hill
- Elermore Vale
- Fletcher
- Hexham
- Lenaghan
- Maryland
- Minmi
- Sandgate
- Shortland
- Tarro
- Wallsend

== Demographics ==
At the 2021 census, there were 168,873 people in the City of Newcastle local government area, of these 49.1 per cent were Male and 50.9 per cent were Female. Aboriginal and Torres Strait Islander people made up 4.4 per cent of the population, which was higher than the national and state averages of 3.2 and 3.4 per cent respectively. The median age of people in the City of Newcastle was 37 years, just below the national median of 38. Children aged 0–14 years made up 16.2 per cent of the population and people aged 65 years and over made up 16.9 per cent of the population. Of people in the area aged 15 years and over, 38.7 per cent were married and 12.7 per cent were either divorced or separated.

Population growth in the City of Newcastle between the 2001 census and the 2006 census was 3.91 per cent; and in the subsequent ten years to the 2016 census, population growth was 9.64 per cent. When compared with total population growth of Australia for the same periods, being 5.78 per cent and 17.86 per cent respectively, population growth in the City of Newcastle local government area was significantly lower than the national average. The median weekly income for residents within the City of Newcastle was marginally higher than the national average.

At the 2021 census, 80.8% of residents in the City of Newcastle local government area stated their country of birth as Australia significantly exceeding the national average of 66.9%. Almost 60% of all residents in the City of Newcastle nominated a religion with Catholicism being at almost 25%, which was slightly higher than the national average of 22.6%. As at the 2016 census, households in the City of Newcastle local government area had a significantly lower than average proportion (11.6%) where a language other than English is spoken (national average was 22.2%).

Selected historical census data for the City of Newcastle local government area
Census year		2001	2006	2011	2016	2021
Population	Estimated residents on Census night	136,413	▲141,753	▲148,535	▲155,411	▲168,873
Population	LGA rank in terms of size within New South Wales				18th	
Population	% of New South Wales population			2.15%	▼2.08%	▲2.09%
Population	% of Australian population	0.73%	▼0.71%	▼0.69%	▼0.66%	0.66%
Cultural and language diversity						
Ancestry, top responses	English			29.2%	▲29.3%	▲40.7%
Ancestry, top responses	Australian			30.4%	▼27.7%	▲37.8%
Ancestry, top responses	Irish			8.9%	▲9.6%	▼12.5%
Ancestry, top responses	Scottish			8.0%	▲8.3%	▲11.6%
Ancestry, top responses	German			2.9%	▲3.0%	–
Ancestry, top responses	Australian Aboriginal	–	–	–	–	4.2%
Language, top responses (other than English)	Mandarin	n/c	▲0.4%	▲0.6%	▲1.2%	▲1.0%
Language, top responses (other than English)	Macedonian	1.1%	▼0.9%	▼0.8%	▼0.7%	▼0.6%
Language, top responses (other than English)	Italian	0.9%	▼0.7%	0.7%	▼0.5%	▼0.4%
Language, top responses (other than English)	Greek	0.7%	0.7%	▼0.6%	▼0.5%	▼0.4%
Language, top responses (other than English)	Religious affiliation					
Religious affiliation, top responses	No Religion	12.7%	▲16.3%	▲22.6%	▲32.8%	▲44.8%
Religious affiliation, top responses	Catholic	26.6%	▼26.1%	▼25.3%	▼22.2%	▼18.9%
Religious affiliation, top responses	Anglican	27.0%	▼25.0%	▼22.3%	▼17.0%	▼12.3%
Religious affiliation, top responses	Uniting Church	8.2%	▼7.0%	▼5.9%	▼4.2%	▼2.9%
Religious affiliation, top responses	Presbyterian and Reformed	4.1%	▼3.5%	▼3.2%	–	–
Median weekly incomes						
Personal income	Median weekly personal income		A$409	▲ A$563	▲ A$660	▲ A$852
Personal income	% of Australian median income		87.8%	▲97.6%	▲99.7%	▲105.8%
Family income	Median weekly family income		A$1,132	▲ A$1,530	▲ A$1,778	▲ A$2,264
Family income	% of Australian median income		96.7%	▲103.3%	▼102.5%	▲106.7%
Household income	Median weekly household income		A$885	▲ A$1,165	▲ A$1,368	▲1,760
Household income	% of Australian median income		86.2%	▲94.4%	▲95.1%	▲100.8%
Dwelling structure						
Dwelling type	Separate house	74.6%	▼73.3%	▲73.5%	▼71.1%	▼69.0%
Dwelling type	Semi-detached, terrace or townhouse	10.0%	▲10.9%	▲12.1%	▲15.4%	▲16.2%
Dwelling type	Flat or apartment	14.1%	▲14.9%	▼13.9%	▼12.7%	▲14.2%

Newcastle City council

Structure
- Political groups: Labor (5) Greens (3) Our Newcastle (2) Liberal (2) Independent (1)

== Council ==
=== Current composition and election method ===
Newcastle City Council is composed of thirteen councillors, including the Lord Mayor, generally for a fixed four-year term of office. The Lord Mayor is directly elected while the twelve other Councillors are elected proportionally as four separate wards, each electing three Councillors. The most recent elections were held on 14 September 2024 (full council) and 18 April 2026 (lord-mayoral by-election). The current makeup of the council, including the Lord Mayor, is as follows:

Party	Councillors
Labor	5
Greens	3
Our Newcastle	2
Liberal	2
Independent	1
Total	13

The current Council, largely elected in September 2024, in order of election by ward is:

Ward	Councillor	Party	Notes
Lord Mayor	Gavin Morris	Independent	Elected at a by-election in April 2026
Ward One	Declan Clausen	Labor	Councillor since 2017 by-election
Ward One	Charlotte McCabe	Greens	Councillor since 2021
Ward One	Peter Gittins	Our Newcastle	Councillor since 2024
Ward Two	Paige Johnson	Labor	Councillor since 2024
Ward Two	Jenny Barrie	Liberal	Councillor since 2021
Ward Two	Joel Pringle	Greens	Councillor since 2024
Ward Three	Peta Winney-Baartz	Labor	Councillor since 2025 count-back election
Ward Three	Mark Brooker	Our Newcastle	Councillor since 2024
Ward Three	Siobhan Isherwood	Greens	Councillor since 2025 count-back election
Ward Four	Elizabeth Adamczyk	Labor	Councillor since 2021
Ward Four	Callum Pull	Liberal	Councillor since 2021
Ward Four	Deahnna Richardson	Labor	Councillor since 2021

== Election results ==
=== 2024 ===
2024 New South Wales local elections: Newcastle
Party	Votes	%	Swing	Seats	Change
Labor	35,324	35.6	−5.2	5	▼1
Our Newcastle	23,306	23.5	+23.5	2	▲2
Greens	20,719	20.9	+4.3	3	▲1
Liberal	16,594	16.7	−1.7	2	▼1
Christians For Community	2,581	2.6	+2.58	0	Steady
Socialist Alliance	707	0.7	−0.2	0	Steady
Independents	87	0.1	+0.08	0	Steady
Formal votes	99,319	93.5			
Informal votes	6,924	6.5			
Total	106,243				

=== 2026 lord mayoral by-election ===
At the election, first time candidate Gavin Morris secured 51.84 percent of the first preference votes and 67.69 percent of the two-candidate preferred vote count. Greens candidate Charlotte McCabe secured a 4.22 percent swing to her party and Labor's Declan Clausen had a significant primary vote drop of 15.57 percent, resulting in Labor being removed from the two-candidate preferred count and final result.

2026 Newcastle lord mayoral by-election
Party	Candidate	Votes	%	±%
Independent	Gavin Morris	52,946	51.82	+51.82
Greens	Charlotte McCabe	19,916	19.49	+4.22
Labor	Declan Clausen	16,725	16.37	−15.57
Liberal	Jenny Barrie	7,318	7.16	−5.68
Socialist Alliance	Stephen O’Brien	3,025	2.96	+0.36
Independent	Milton Caine	2,241	2.19	−0.7
Total formal votes		102,171	97.75	+1.4
Informal votes		2,349	2.25	−1.4
Two-candidate-preferred result
Independent	Gavin Morris	60,169	67.69	+67.69
Greens	Charlotte McCabe	28,718	32.31	+32.31
Independent hold		Swing		

== Sister cities ==
Newcastle Council has sister city relations with the following cities:

City	Prefecture/State	Country	Year
Ube	Yamaguchi	Japan	1980
Dubbo	New South Wales	Australia	1995
Arcadia	California	United States	

== Coat of arms ==
Coat of arms of the City of Newcastle

Adopted
Formal grant by the Kings of Arms, 20 March 1961 (Earl Marshal's Warrant, 8 March 1961).
Crest
Out of a Mural Crown Or a Mount Vert thereon a Lighthouse proper.
Helm
A closed Helmet, mantling per pale Vert and Azure, doubled Or.
Escutcheon
Vert, on a Pile Or another Azure charged with a Lymphad the sail furled proper Flagged Gules, on a Chief Gold a Fleece also proper banded also Gold between a Lozenge and Wheel Sable.
Supporters
On either side a Seagull wings elevated and addorsed proper gorged with a Mural Crown Or.
Compartment
Sand and foaming waves.
Motto
Enterprise
Symbolism
The escutcheon elements represent the status of Newcastle as a port city, with the blue waters projecting into the fertile green of the land. The gold chief and chevron represent wealth and fertility and the chevron also symbolises the beaches between land and sea. The Lymphad symbolises shipping and maritime trade. In the chief, the gold field also represents wealth and fertility, with a golden fleece for the produce and wealth of agriculture. The black lozenge represents the coal industry, upon which much of Newcastle's wealth is built, and the wheel represents the wheels of industry and trade. The compartment comprises sand and waves for the numerous beaches of the area, while the seagull supporters are a common aquatic bird of the city and are symbolic of the coastal position. The supporters are gorged (collared) by a mural crown to represent civic authority. The crest comprises a lighthouse upon a green mount representing the Nobbys Head Light on Nobbys Head, a prominent feature of the city that also alludes to the importance of shipping. The crest emerged from a gold Mural crown that represents civic authority.
Previous versions
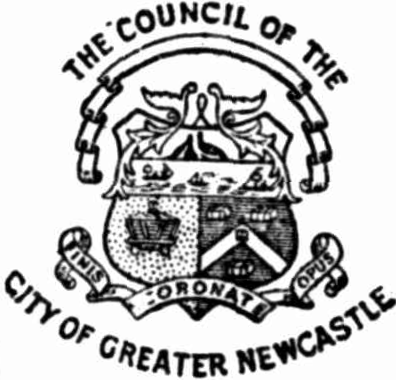
Following the proclamation of Newcastle as a city in 1885, the Council engaged James Sayers, Newcastle manager of the London Chartered Bank, to design a Council Seal. Sayers' design featured a shield surmounted by a scroll with the words "City of Newcastle" and another scroll beneath with the Latin motto "Finis coronat opus" ("The end crowns the work"). The shield featured Nobbys Head and Lighthouse, with three sailing ships, a loaded coal truck, and three bales of wool. This badge was readopted in 1938 by the new City of Greater Newcastle with the amended council name.
Other versions
The flag adopted by the Council features the full armorial achievement on a bicolour of the city's official colours adopted in 1923, Cinnamon Brown and Emerald Green . The colours are those used by the 35th Battalion "Newcastle's Own Regiment".
