= Jesmond, New South Wales =

Jesmond
- Suburb
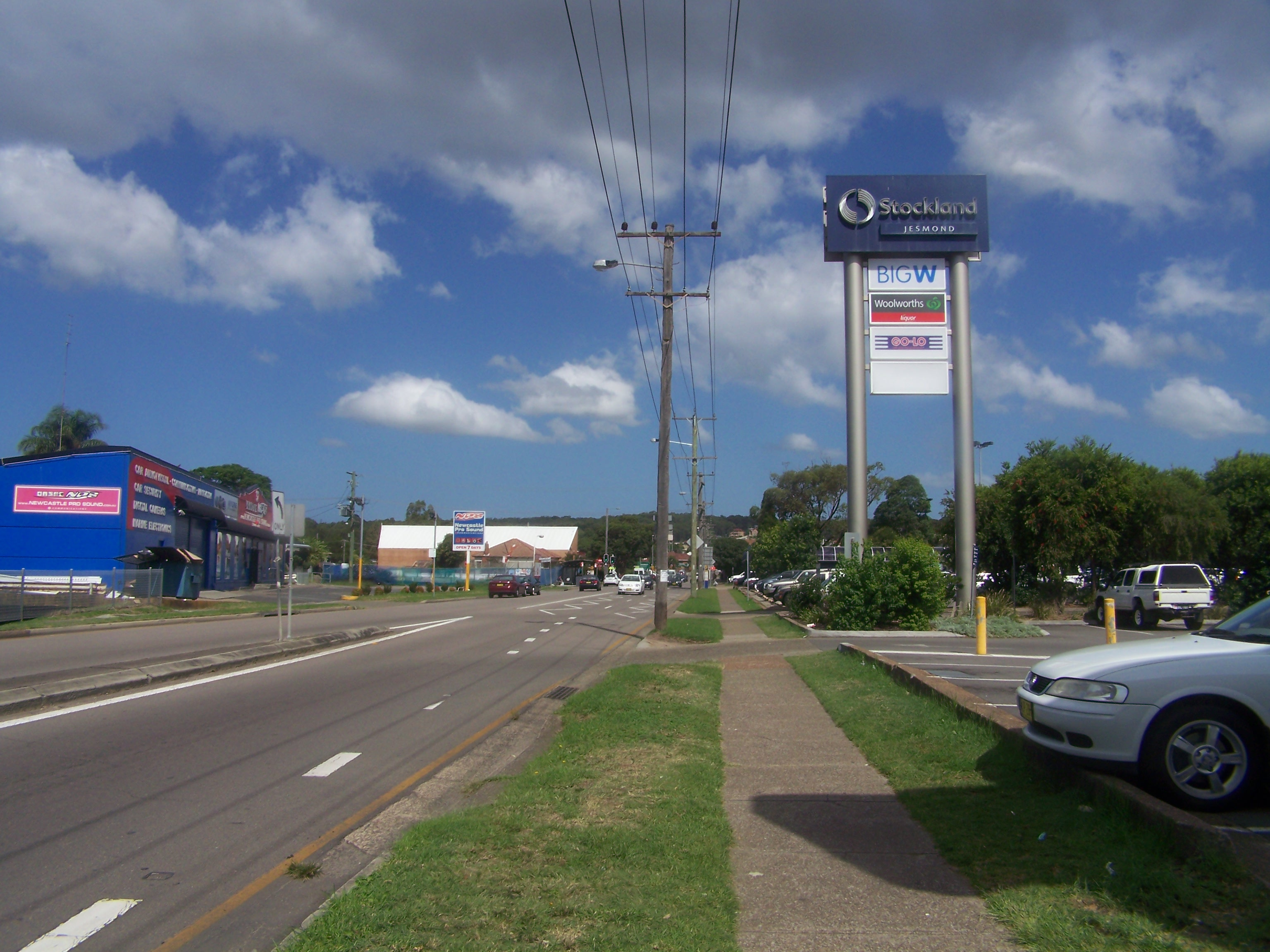
- Blue Gum Road, Jesmond, viewing south, location of Stockland Jesmond Shopping Centre c. 2011.

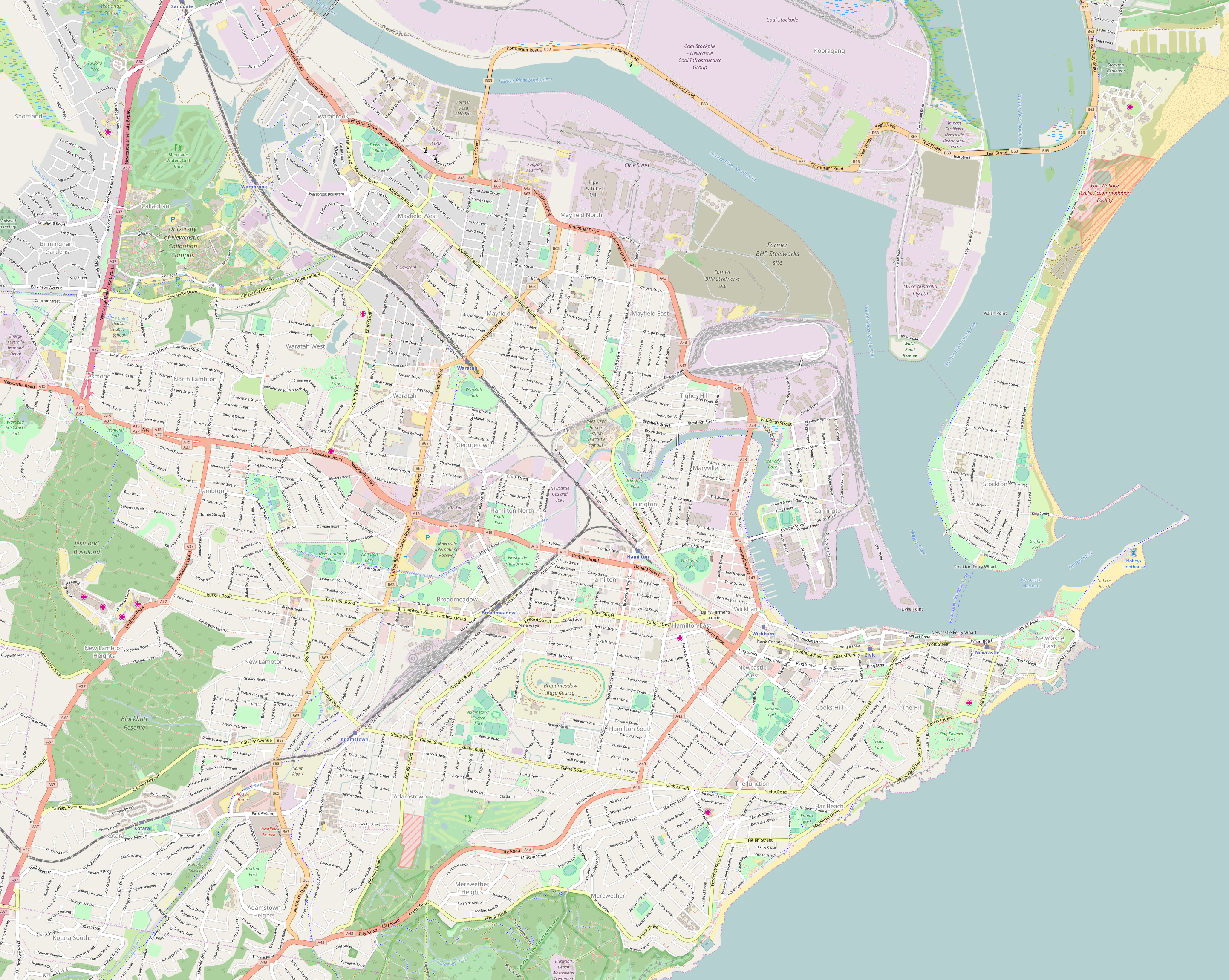
- Interactive map of Jesmond
- Coordinates: 32°54′13″S 151°41′39″E
- Country: Australia
- State: New South Wales
- Region: Hunter
- City: Newcastle
- LGA: City of Newcastle
- Location: 151 km (94 mi) N of Sydney; 9.4 km (5.8 mi) WNW of Newcastle; 25 km (16 mi) SE of Maitland; 62 km (39 mi) N of The Entrance; 82 km (51 mi) N of Gosford

Government
  - State electorate: Wallsend
  - Federal division: Newcastle

Area (Note: Area calculation is based on 1:100000 map 9232 NEWCASTLE)
  - Total: 1.3 km^{2} (0.50 sq mi)
- Elevation: 15 m (49 ft)

Population
  - Total: 3,210 (SAL 2021)
  - Density: 1,877.7/km^{2} (4,863/sq mi)
- Time zone: UTC+10 (AEST)
  - Summer (DST): UTC+11 (AEDT)
- Postcode: 2299
- County: Northumberland
- Parish: Newcastle
Suburbs around Jesmond
Birmingham Gardens	Birmingham Gardens	Callaghan
Wallsend	Jesmond	North Lambton
Wallsend	Wallsend	Lambton

Jesmond (/ˈdʒɛzmənd/ JEZ-mənd) is a suburb of the City of Newcastle LGA, located about 9.5 km (6 mi) west of the Newcastle CBD in the Hunter Region of New South Wales, Australia. It is both a commercial centre and dormitory suburb of Newcastle. Residents include Australian and international students attending the University of Newcastle in adjacent Callaghan. The suburb also has numerous aged housing facilities. The suburb is very multicultural due to many international university students. According to the 2006 Census there were 2,442 people in 1,144 dwellings (in 2001 there were 2376 people in 1140 dwellings).

== History ==
The Aboriginal people, in this area, the Awabakal, were the first people of this land.

Jesmond's original European settler name was "Dark Creek." Jesmond was the location of orchards and steam saw-mills. A village was established in the area by 1883 with around 600 residents. A soap works was established in the area in the 1880s. There is some contradiction as to the source of "Jesmond" as the suburb's name with different sources attributing it to the suburb under the same name in Newcastle upon Tyne in the North of England and "Jesmond Dene", a park in Jesmond.

Jesmond was highly impacted by the Great Depression which forced many to live in a shanty town called "Hollywood". This shanty town was located on an old railway track which led to Wallsend it stretched from about 600 m into bushland near the Jesmond roundabout . Up to forty families lived and was sometimes referred to as Doggville.

== Schools ==
Jesmond has access to a number of schools, including Heaton Public School, Jesmond Public School and the Jesmond Senior Campus of Callaghan College.

== Shopping and transport ==
Jesmond's commercial centre is situated on Blue Gum Road. There are a number of mixed businesses as well as a large shopping mall. The area serves Newcastle with a district centre function and as a transport junction with main roads in east–west and northern directions.

Jesmond Central shopping centre (formerly Stockland Jesmond) is on Blue Gum Road, approximately 9 km (6 mi) west-north-west of the Newcastle CBD. The centre includes major stores such as Woolworths and Big W, as well as over 60 specialty stores. The centre has parking for over 900 cars.

== Recreation and sport ==
Jesmond Park and Heaton Park are Jesmond's two main public parks for sport events, complemented by the facilities at Callaghan Campus (Y11-Y12 only). Jesmond Park, situated with a bushland setting to its southern boundary, is a popular destination for family barbecues and wedding photography given its extensive rose garden.

Jesmond Football Club, "The Rams", are the local soccer team based at Jesmond Park. The club was founded in 1928 and has a long and proud history. Heaton Park also features an oval-shaped concrete skateboarding bowl.
