= Newcastle Transport =

Public transport operator in New South Wales, Australia

- Parent: Keolis Australia
- Commenced operation: 1 July 2017
- Headquarters: Hamilton, New South Wales
- Service area: Newcastle; Lake Macquarie
- Service type: Bus, ferry, light rail
- Chief executive: Campbell Mason
- Website: www.newcastletransport.info

Newcastle Transport is a public transport operator in Newcastle, New South Wales. A subsidiary of Keolis Australia, it operates bus, ferry and light rail services under contract to Transport for NSW.

== History and operations ==
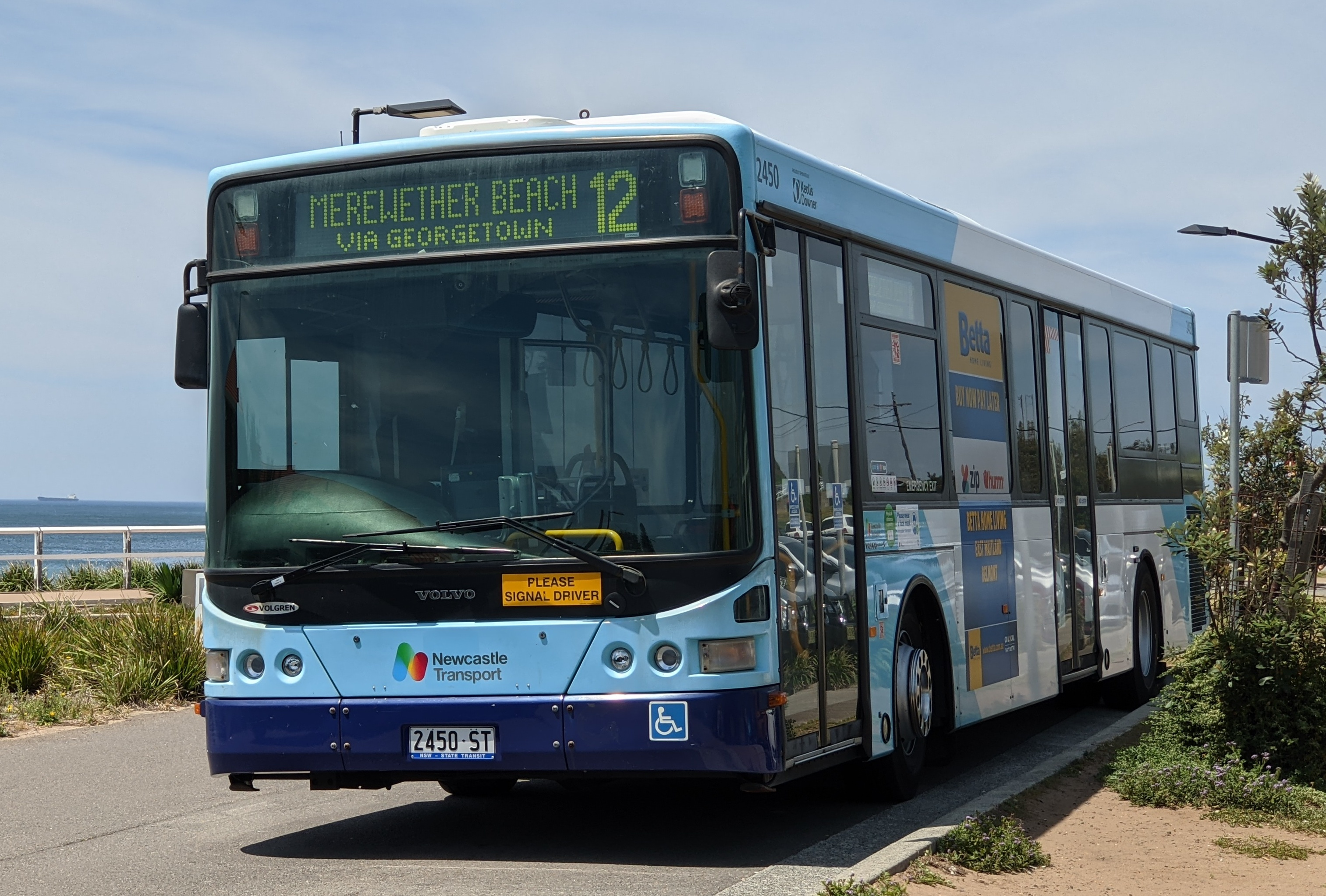
A Volgren bodied Volvo B7RLE

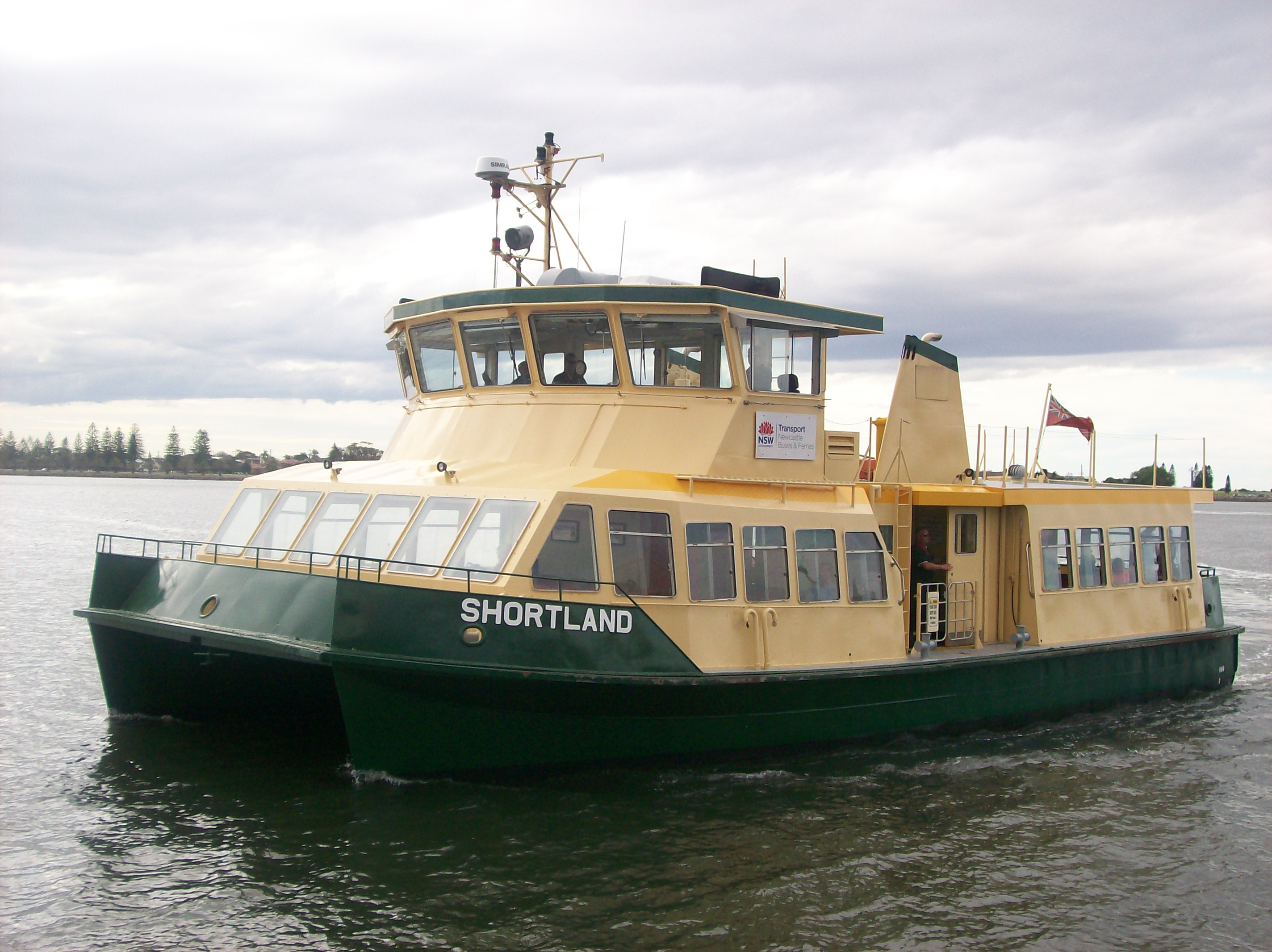
MV Shortland approaching Queens Wharf

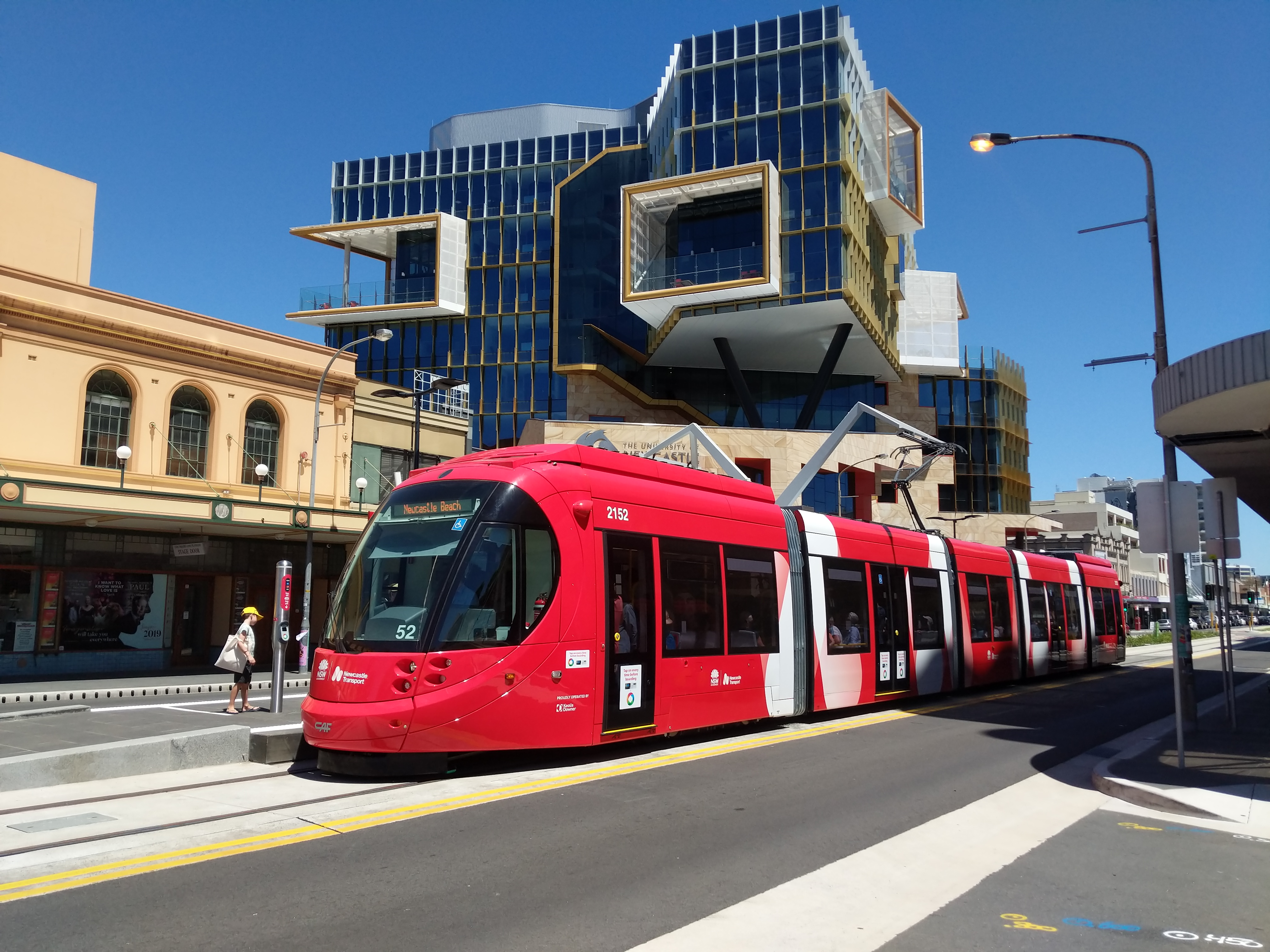
CAF Urbos 3 tram on Hunter Street

In November 2015, the Government of New South Wales announced its intention to contract out the operation of Newcastle Buses & Ferries services to the private sector. Keolis Downer and a Transit Systems/UGL Rail consortium announced their intentions to bid. In December 2016, a ten-year contract was awarded to Keolis Downer effective from 1 July 2017.

=== Ticketing ===
All public transport services under Newcastle Transport utilise the Opal ticketing system.

== Services ==
=== Bus ===
In January 2018, the bus route network was completely redesigned with the number of routes reduced from 27 to 21. In the same year, Newcastle Transport began trialling an on-demand bus service within the Lake Macquarie area, servicing the suburbs of Dudley, Mount Hutton and Warners Bay.

Newcastle Transport commenced operations with a fleet of 172 MAN, Mercedes-Benz and Volvo buses. Buses are operated out of depots in Belmont and Hamilton.

In February 2023, Newcastle Transport began using zero emission electric buses built by Bustech on the ZDI-450 electric integral chassis.

=== Ferry ===
Newcastle Transport operates a passenger ferry service that takes five minutes to cross the Hunter River between Queens Wharf and Stockton. The 1986 built ferries are MV Hunter and MV Shortland.

=== Light rail ===
Newcastle Transport operates the Newcastle Light Rail between Newcastle Interchange and Newcastle Beach station in Newcastle East with six CAF Urbos 3 trams. The light rail opened in February 2019.
