= Stockton ferry service =

Ferry service in Newcastle, New South Wales, Australia

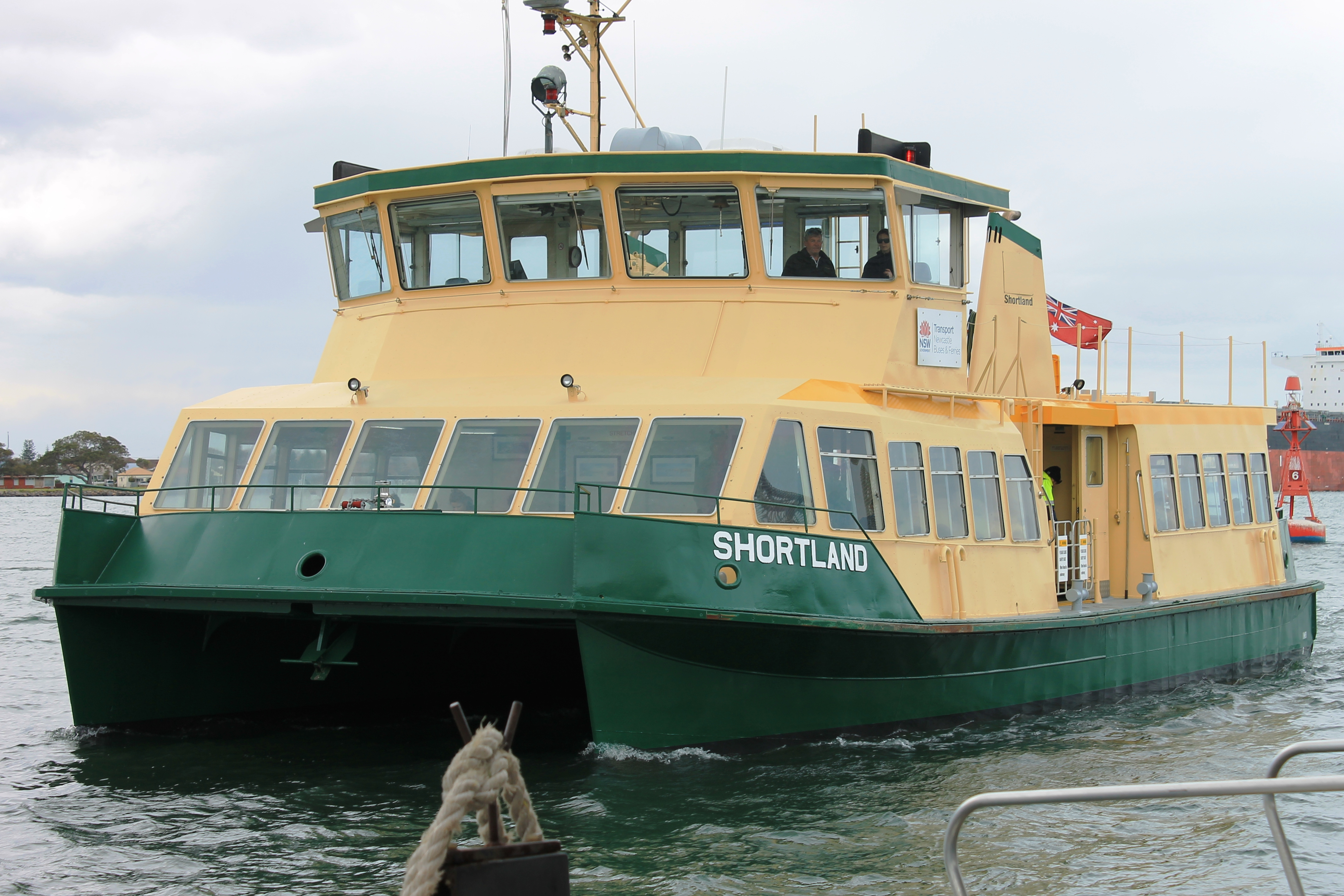
- MV Shortland in September 2015
- Locale: Newcastle, New South Wales
- Waterway: Hunter River
- Owner: Transport for NSW
- Operator: Newcastle Transport
- System length: 600 metres
- No. of vessels: 2
- No. of terminals: 2
- Website: www.newcastletransport.info

The Stockton ferry service is a ferry service in Newcastle, New South Wales. Operated by Newcastle Transport under contract to Transport for NSW, it crosses the Hunter River from the Newcastle CBD at Queens Wharf to Stockton.

== History ==
Prior to the construction of various road projects connecting the outer western suburbs of Newcastle and crossing the Hunter River, including the Stockton Bridge, numerous ferry services, both privately run and publicly operated, shuttled across the Hunter River to link the locality of Stockton with the rest of Newcastle during the 19th and 20th centuries, including a car ferry service from the former Market Street Wharf and Stockton. This relatively vast network of wharves and services on the river included many wharves on the Newcastle foreshore, Bullock Island, the Stockton foreshore, and Port Waratah.

The passenger ferry service that operated between Queens Wharf and Stockton, which runs in an area further downstream of the river from the bridge, is the only ferry service in Newcastle that still operates, surviving a wave of service decommissions prompted by the opening of the Stockton Bridge in 1971. Having become unprofitable, it was discontinued in July 1982. It was revived in February 1983 by the Government of New South Wales owned Newcastle Buses & Ferries. Initially the Edith Walter and West Head, two ferries previously used by the former operator, were chartered to operate the service until two new vessels were delivered in 1986.

In July 2017, it was included in the transfer of Newcastle Buses & Ferries' operations to Newcastle Transport.

== Services ==
Standard icon used on timetables and maps

Ferries operate every 15 minutes during peak periods and every 20–30 minutes outside peak periods. No services operate during a period varying from 50 to 60 minutes at noon depending on the day of the week. The journey time between the two wharves is five minutes.

== Wharves ==
| Name | Travel Time | Waterway | Serving Suburbs |
Stockton Ferry
| Queens Wharf | dep. | Hunter River | Newcastle CBD |
| Stockton | 5 minutes | Hunter River | Stockton |

== Vessels ==
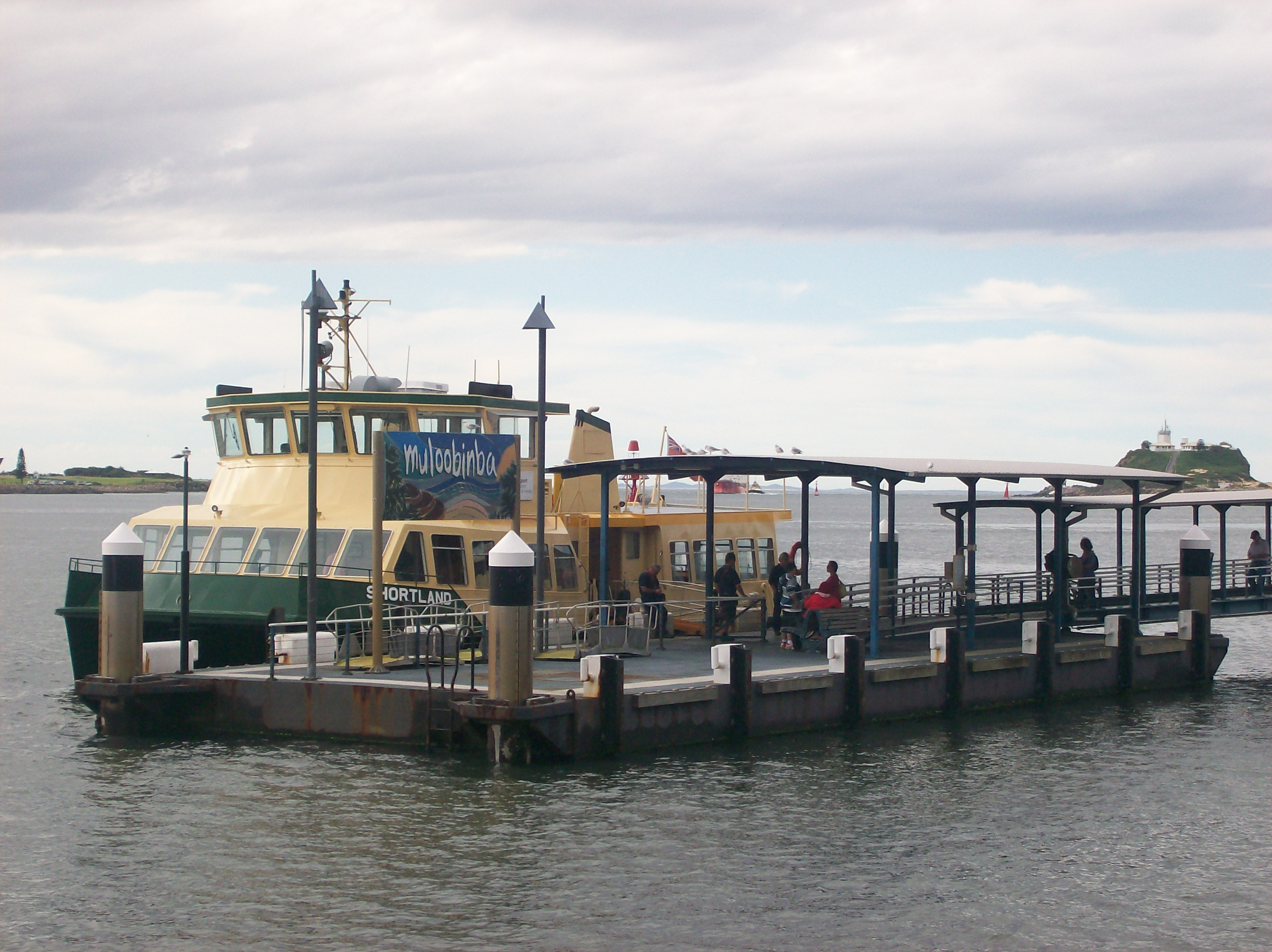
MV Shortland at Queens Wharf in July 2013

The fleet comprises two 127 seat ferries built in 1986 at the Carrington Slipways, Tomago as single-deck versions of the First Fleet class built for the Urban Transit Authority for use on Sydney Harbour at the same time. Both were refurbished in Port Macquarie in 2018.

| Name | Registration | MMSI | Shipyard no | Completed | Namesake |
|---|---|---|---|---|---|
| Shortland | 24155 | 503006950 | 187 | May 1986 | John Shortland |
| Hunter | 15194 | 503707100 | 188 | June 1986 | John Hunter |
