= Bluebell Collision =

Maritime tragedy in 1934

Coordinates: 32°55′20.4″S 151°46′52.5″E

The sinking of the Newcastle harbour ferry Bluebell, after colliding with the coastal freighter Waraneen in 1934, was one of the worst maritime tragedies in Newcastle, Australia, in the 20th century.

== Collision ==
Carrying between 40 and 50 passengers, the Stockton-bound ferry came into a broadside collision with Waraneen and sank halfway across the Hunter River shortly after 10:45pm on the night of 9 August 1934. Although it was first thought that all passengers had been saved, it was discovered the following morning that three passengers were still unaccounted for.

The ferry had jammed against the side of the freighter for a period of almost a minute before it began to sink. The brief interval allowed sufficient time for six passengers on the upper deck to scramble in to the side of Waraneen, while the remainder jumped headlong into the water.

People standing on the Newcastle wharf were unable to discern exactly what was happening in the middle of the harbour, but could hear terrified cries of women and children on board the ferry before it sank, and afterwards as they struggled frantically in the water.

== Rescue ==
The pilot steamer Birubi, which was moving past the scene at the time of the sinking, lowered a boat and picked up two loads of people while others were rescued by the Water Police launch.

Fifteen people were treated at the Newcastle Hospital, two were admitted suffering severely from the effects of immersion. The propellers of the steamer Wailhemo, heading out to sea the following morning, churned the water which broke up the wreckage and released the bodies of two women. A third missing woman who was seen on board the ferry by a neighbour was considered the only other victim of the sinking.

== Postscript ==
Later in August 1934, a marine court determined that the ferry pilot was at fault.

The rudder of the sunken ferry was recovered by two fishermen in the Hunter River during 1974 and it is now kept in the Newcastle Maritime Museum at Honeysuckle.

The last survivor of Bluebell, Mr. Ed Felton, died two weeks shy of the seventieth anniversary of the sinking in 2004.
