= Rosemount, Saratoga =

Rosemount
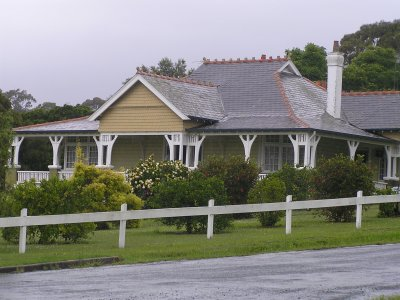

- Location within New South Wales Location within Australia
- 33.4758°S 151.3513°E
- Location: 36 Village Road, Saratoga, Central Coast, New South Wales, Australia

History
- Built: 1917

New South Wales Heritage Register
- Official name: Rosemount
- Type: state heritage (built)
- Designated: 2 April 1999
- Reference no.: 286
- Type: House
- Category: Residential buildings (private)

Rosemount is a heritage-listed residence at 36 Village Road, Saratoga, Central Coast, New South Wales, Australia. It was built in 1917. It was added to the New South Wales State Heritage Register on 2 April 1999.

== History ==
Like most settlements on Brisbane Water, Saratoga had been subdivided as a holiday resort after the coming of the railway. This particular subdivision, New Brighton Estate made provision not only for the usual small allotments on the waterfront but, mindful of the nature of the soil and the interest of an adjoining landowner, several orchard and farm blocks.

John Bourke had settled in the area in the area in 1863 and became a pioneer of commercial citrus-growing on the Central Coast. Most if not all of the orchard and farm blocks were purchased by the Bourke family to extend their citrus activities.

Rosemount was built in about 1917 on a 16-acre (6.5 hectare) parcel of land owned by Martin and Mary Bourke (née Callen) which was part of the New Brighton Estate. The material for the house was supplied by Mary Bourke's father Peter Callen as a wedding present to his daughter.

Peter Callen left the Saratoga area as a young man and settled in the Stockton area of Newcastle where he established a very successful boat-building business. Most of the tradesman who built Rosemount were employees of his.

MMartin Bourke gave a portion of his land to the Council for use as a road (now known as Steyne Road East) and also donated an area of land on the corner of High Street and Brooklyn Road for the erection of a Catholic church. Unfortunately due to a lack of parking facilities the land was deemed unsuitable and was subsequently sold. The money was then used to purchase a site in Davistown Road where the Catholic Church now stands.

In March 1983, the owner of Rosemount (and Peter Callen's granddaughter), Molly Broad, applied for a Permanent Conservation Order. At the time Rosemount was under considerable pressure for subdivision because of its zoning and consequent local rates and State land taxes incumbent upon it. A Permanent Conservation Order was placed over the property on 2 December 1983 and it was transferred to the State Heritage Register on 2 April 1999.

== Description ==
Rosemount is an imposing late Federation style residence located on a corner block of approximately 0.5 hectares in area at Saratoga. Set in landscaped grounds it has features of Californian bungalow style including its weatherboard construction, single gables and squat brick columns in its verandah. Part of Rosemount's landscaping consists of small sandstone block walls. The stone were originally hewn by convicts to build a house for the officer-in-charge of the area and were later moved to this site. Some citrus trees survive on the property.

The building was reported to be in good condition as at 4 December 2007.

== Heritage listing ==
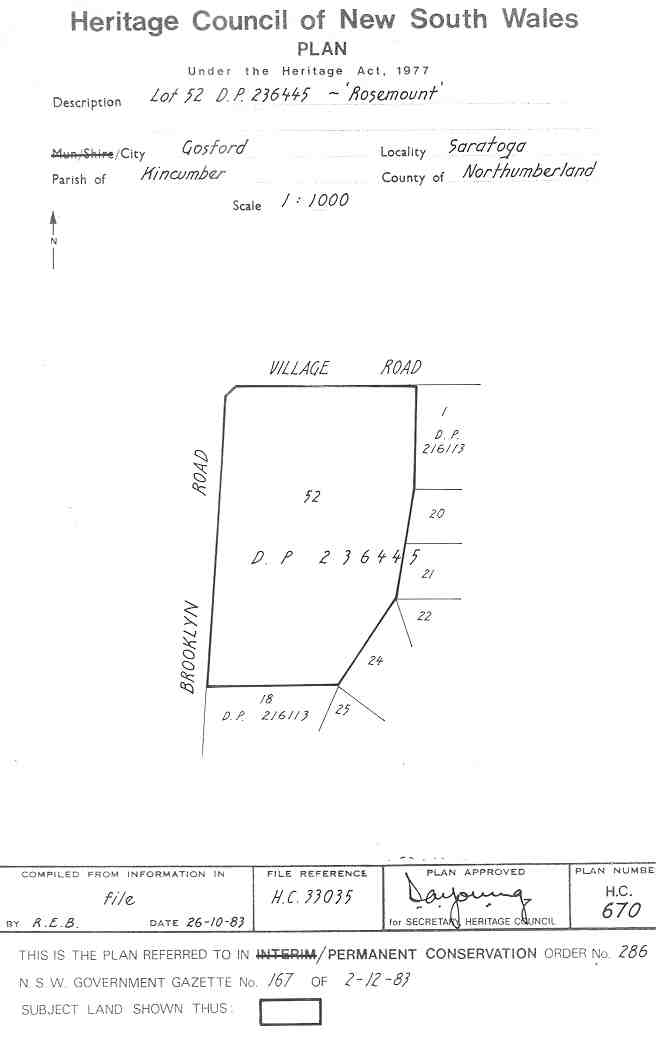
Heritage boundaries

Rosemount was listed on the New South Wales State Heritage Register on 2 April 1999 having satisfied the following criteria:

The place has a strong or special association with a person, or group of persons, of importance of cultural or natural history of New South Wales's history.

Rosemount is a historical landmark in the Saratoga area and is associated with the Callen and Bourke families who were two pioneering land-owning families of the Davistown/Saratoga area.

The place is important in demonstrating aesthetic characteristics and/or a high degree of creative or technical achievement in New South Wales.

Rosemount is rare and intact late Federation style residence located on a corner block of approximately 0.5 hectares in area at Saratoga. Set in landscaped grounds that are integral to its setting, it has features of Californian bungalow style including its weatherboard construction, single gables and squat brick columns in its verandah. Rosemount is a historical landmark in the Saratoga area

The place possesses uncommon, rare or endangered aspects of the cultural or natural history of New South Wales.

Rosemount is rare and intact late Federation style residence on the Central Coast.
