= Newcastle Buses & Ferries =

Former public bus operator

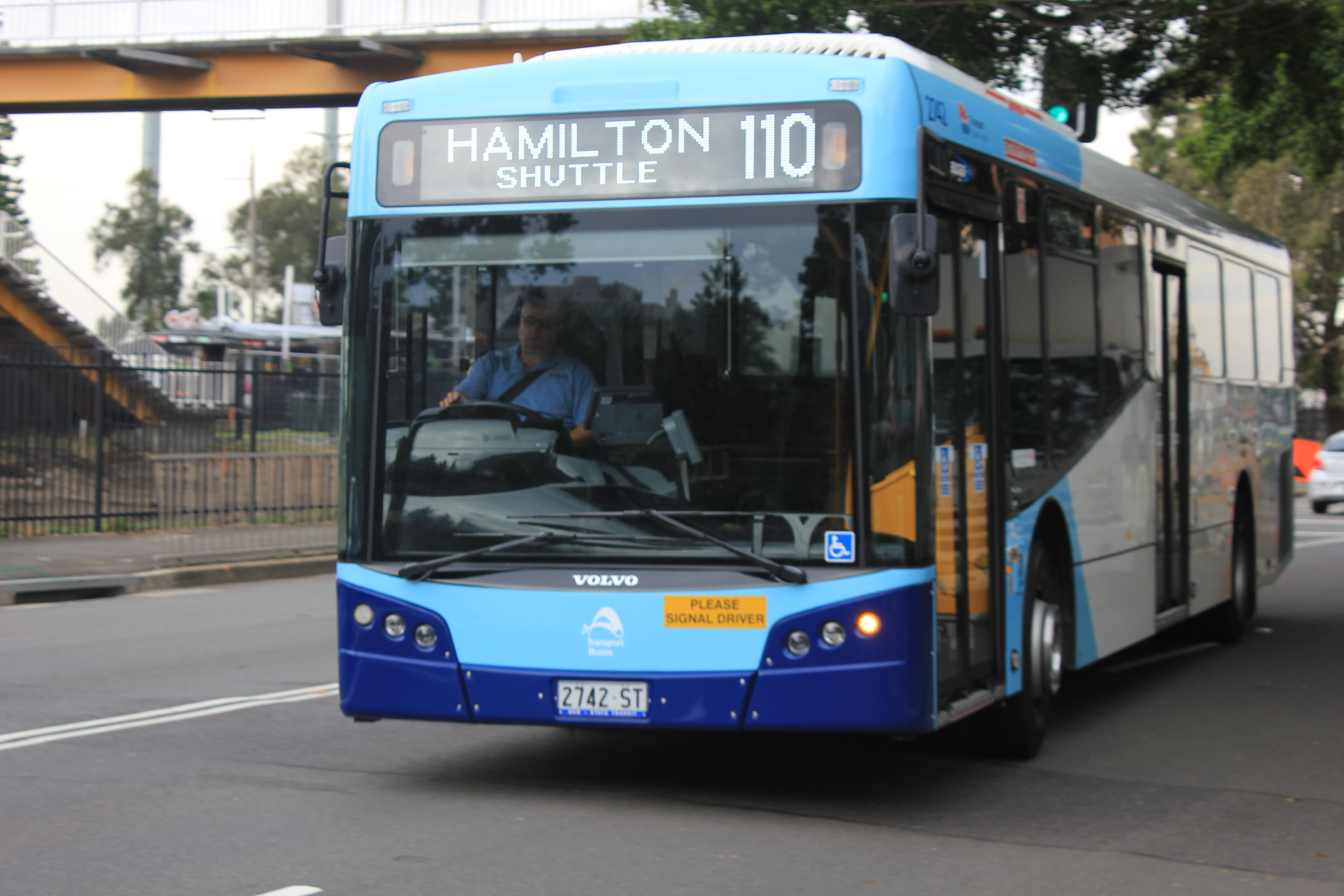
- Newcastle Buses & Ferries Volvo B7RLE in September 2016
- Parent: State Transit Authority
- Commenced operation: 22 September 1935
- Ceased operation: 30 June 2017
- Headquarters: Hamilton
- Service area: Lake Macquarie; Newcastle
- Service type: Bus & ferry operator
- Routes: 26 (June 2017)
- Depots: 2
- Fleet: 180 buses, 2 ferries (June 2017)
- Website: www.newcastlebuses.info

Newcastle Buses & Ferries was a commuter bus and ferry service operating in Newcastle and Lake Macquarie from 1935 until 2017. Part of the State Transit Authority, it operated 26 bus routes and the Stockton ferry across the Hunter River.

== History ==
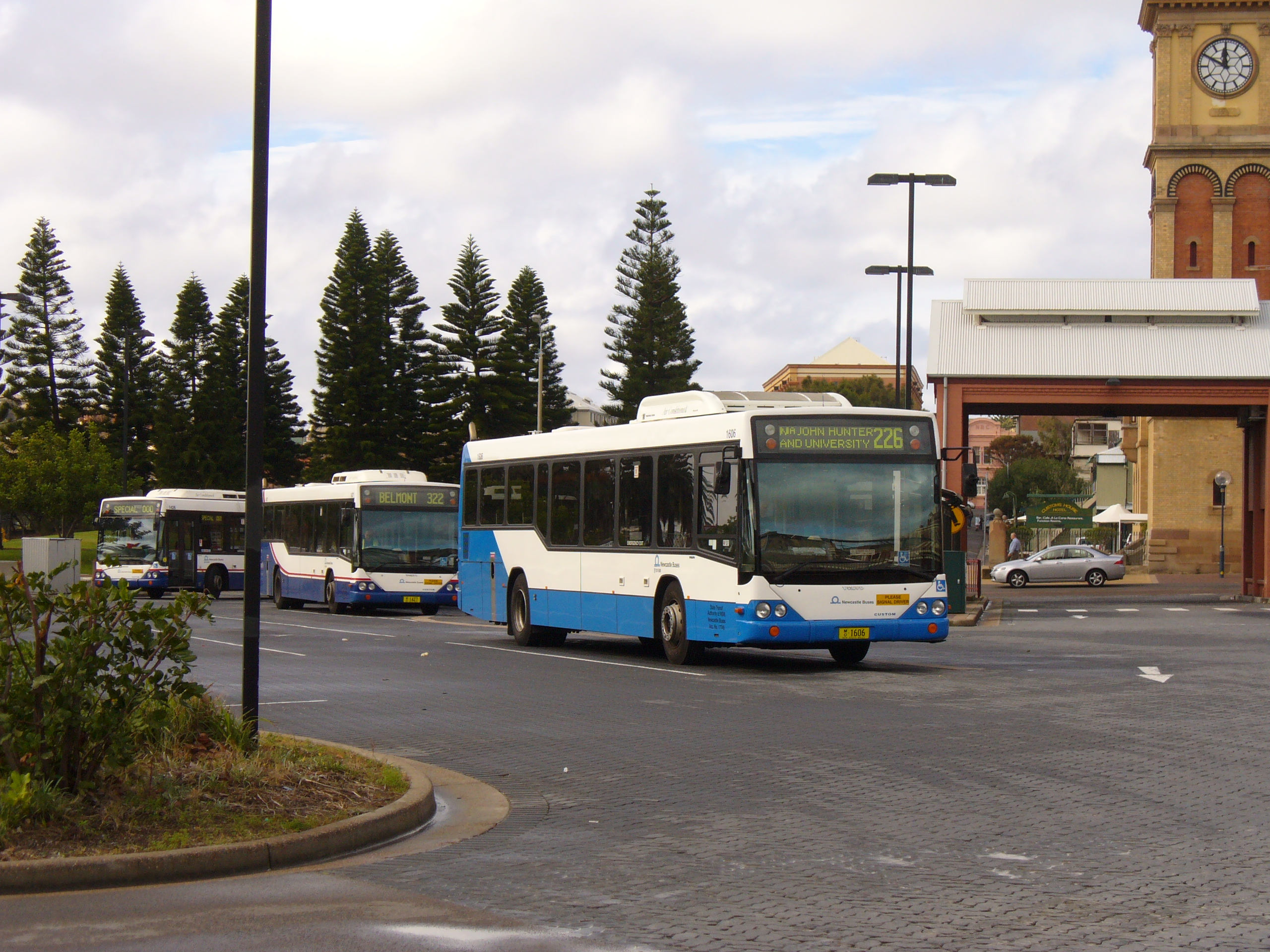
Buses at the Newcastle station layover in July 2006

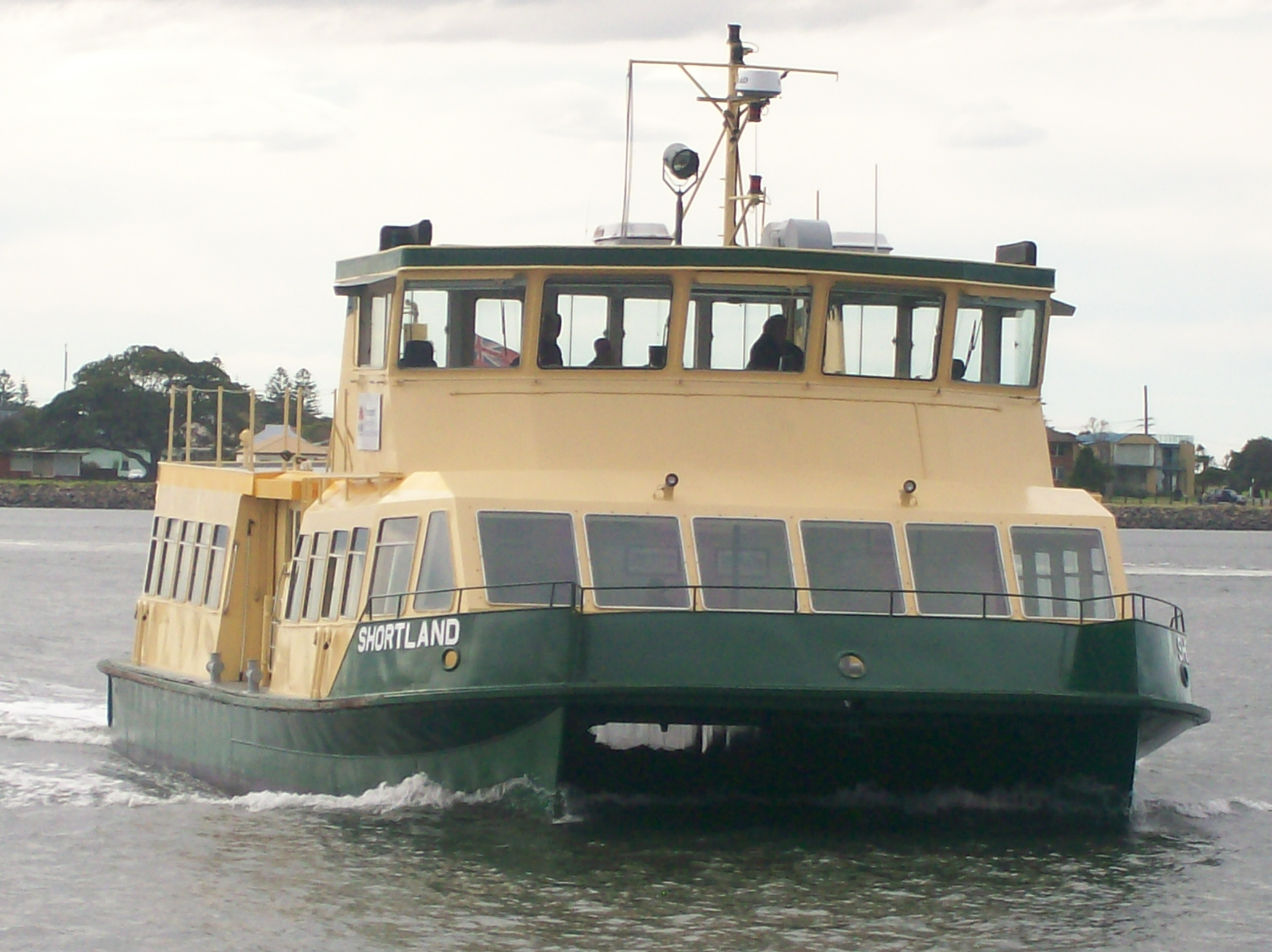
MV Shortland in July 2013

The first government operated bus route commenced on 22 September 1935 to Mayfield. On 10 June 1950, the final tram routes were withdrawn. On 2 February 1983, the Stockton ferry service was taken over from a private operator.

In November 2015, the Government announced its intention to incorporate Newcastle Buses & Ferries into the Newcastle Transport along with the Newcastle Light Rail and that the operation of services shall be contracted to a private operator. Keolis Downer and the Transit Systems/UGL Rail consortium announced their intentions to bid. In December 2016, the contract was awarded to Keolis Downer. The Newcastle Transport took over the services from 1 July 2017.

== Routes ==
The bus network radiated from a bus terminal in Scott Street near NSW TrainLink's former Newcastle station. Buses were parked in a designated layover area adjacent to the station. However, the buses did not pick up or set down in this area. Major interchanges were located at University of Newcastle, Wallsend, Glendale, Warners Bay, Belmont, Charlestown Square, Westfield Kotara and Broadmeadow station.

From 1 July 2006, Newcastle Buses' services formed Sydney Outer Metropolitan Bus Regions 5. The initial eight-year contract was renewed further for three more years from 1 July 2014.

== Depots ==
Bus depots were located at Hamilton, which opened as a tram depot in 1923, and Belmont, which opened in April 1953.

== Fleet ==
At the time of cessation, the bus fleet consisted of 180 MAN, Mercedes-Benz and Volvo buses. There were two ferries, the 1986 built Hunter and Shortland, named after Governor John Hunter and naval officer John Shortland.

== Fares ==
Unlike other State Transit Authority run buses, Newcastle Buses & Ferries historically used a time-based ticketing system which was separate from the MyZone ticketing system. Single tickets could be purchased for one, four or 23 hours, or a TimeTen ticket Multiride which equated to ten one hour tickets. Other than the 23-hour ticket, time-based tickets could not be used on the ferry. Newcastle Buses & Ferries also accepted, but did not sell, TravelPass, MyMulti, and Excursion tickets from the MyZone system, but not MyBus or TravelTen. As part of the Opal card rollout, 11 types of tickets including the 23 hours tickets were withdrawn on 20 November 2014. With Opal fares, the time-based ticketing system ceased. From 1 January 2016 the 1 hour ticket was the only non-Opal ticket available for use on Newcastle Buses. Paper tickets were withdrawn on 1 August 2016.

=== Free Bus Zone ===
Trips within a designated area of the Newcastle CBD on Newcastle Buses & Ferries services were zero-fare under the Newcastle Alliance's Free City Buses programme. The zero-fare zone operated daily between 07:30 and 18:00. The programme received funding from the Honeysuckle Development Corporation and Government of New South Wales. The Fare Free Zone continued after the takeover by Newcastle Transport but ceased when the Newcastle Light Rail commenced on 18 February 2019.

Newcastle Buses also ran a free shuttle within this zone as route 555 with buses in a green livery. It was discontinued due to low patronage in August 2013.
