= Queens Wharf =

Venue in Newcastle, Australia

- Interactive map of the Queens Wharf area

General information
- Location: Wharf Road, Newcastle, New South Wales, Australia
- Coordinates: 32.9254°S 151.7808°E
- Opened: May 1988
- Demolished: September 2018 (tower only)
- Cost: $13 million

Technical details
- Floor count: 3

Design and construction
- Architect: Kevin Snell

Queens Wharf is a multi-purpose venue in Newcastle, New South Wales, Australia with a cafe, pub, restaurant, observation tower and ferry wharf built as part of the redevelopment of the Hunter River foreshore. Opened in May 1988 by Queen Elizabeth II, it was completed as a Bicentennial project. The Queens Wharf project was the vision of Joy Cummings, who became Lord Mayor of Newcastle in 1974, the first woman ever to hold such a position in Australia.

The Queens Wharf Tower was demolished in September 2018. The decision to keep the observation tower would cost ratepayers $1.6 million in the next four years in maintenance costs. The total cost of demolition was estimated to cost $30,000.

The ferry wharf is served by Newcastle Transport's Stockton ferry service.

The wharf also has a stop on the Newcastle Light Rail.

Preceding wharf	Stockton Ferry	Following wharf
Stockton Terminus	Stockton Ferry	Terminus
Preceding station	Newcastle Light Rail	Following station
Crown Street towards Newcastle Interchange	Newcastle Light Rail	Newcastle Beach Terminus
