= Ray Jackson =

Ray Jackson or Raymond Jackson may refer to:

- Ray Jackson (Aboriginal activist) (1941–2015), Australian Indigenous rights activist
- Ray Jackson (American football) (Running back, born 1962), American football player
- Raymond Jackson (American football) (Defensive back, born 1973), American football player
- Ray Jackson (Australian footballer) (1910–1968), Australian rules footballer
- Ray Jackson (basketball) (born 1973), American basketball player
- Ray Jackson (musician) (born 1948), British mandolin and harmonica player
- Raymond Jackson (songwriter) (1941–1972), American soul music songwriter and record producer
- Ray Jackson (serial killer) (born 1967), American serial killer
- Raymond Alvin Jackson (born 1949), United States federal judge
- Raymond Carl Jackson (1928–2008), American botanist
- Raymond Jackson ("JAK") (1927–1997), cartoonist of the London Evening Standard

== See also ==
- Alvin Ray Jackson (born 1980), American football player
