= Vera Deacon =

Australian historian, writer, and philanthropist (1926–2021)

Dr Vera Frances Deacon OAM (née Pember, 19 July 1926 – 16 May 2021) was an Australian historian, writer and philanthropist.

== Biography ==
Deacon was born in the Newcastle suburb of Mayfield and raised on Dempsey and Mosquito Island (also known as Moscheto), on the Hunter River. She lived for many years in Stockton and was actively involved in the study and promotion of the history of Stockton and the Hunter River Islands.

Deacon was interviewed in 1995 about communists and the left in arts and community oral history project. The recording can be found at the National Library of Australia.

In 2019, the book Singing Back The River was published, which includes her stories and recollections of life on the Hunter River.

She first started donating to the University of Newcastle’s archives in 2001 to support regional history through the acquisition, conservation and research of significant regional historical resources.

== Recognition ==
The Vera Deacon Regional History Fund was established in her honour in 2008. She was named Freeman of the City of Newcastle, New South Wales, Australia in 2019.

In 2020, Deacon was awarded the Medal of the Order of Australia for service to community history and to conservation. In this same year she was awarded an honorary doctorate, Doctor of Letters, from the University of Newcastle.
