= Ray Robinson (Australian cricketer) =

Australian cricketer

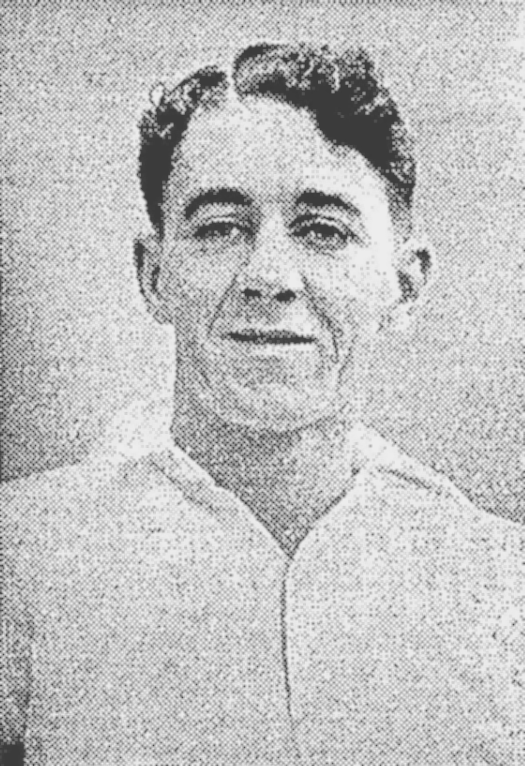
- Robinson in 1936

Personal information
- Full name: Rayford Harold Robinson
- Born: 26 March 1914; Stockton, New South Wales
- Died: 10 August 1965 (aged 51); Stockton, New South Wales
- Batting: Right-handed
- Bowling: Legbreak, googly

International information
- National side: Australia
- Only Test (cap 156): 4 December 1936 v England

Domestic team information
- Years: Team
- 1934/35–1936/37: New South Wales
- 1937/38: South Australia
- 1939/40: New South Wales
- 1946/47–1948/49: Otago

Career statistics
Competition	Test	First-class
Matches	1	46
Runs scored	5	2,441
Batting average	2.50	31.70
100s/50s	0/0	4/13
Top score	3	163
Balls bowled	–	3,500
Wickets	–	44
Bowling average	–	37.59
5 wickets in innings	–	0
10 wickets in match	–	0
Best bowling	–	4/45
Catches/stumpings	1/–	24/–
- Source: CricInfo, 14 October 2022

Rayford Harold Robinson (26 March 1914 – 10 August 1965) was an Australian cricketer who played in one Test match in 1936. He played first-class cricket for New South Wales and South Australia before World War II and in New Zealand for Otago between the 1946–47 and 1948–49 seasons.

Considered a stylish batsman and useful leg break bowler, Robinson scored over 2,000 first-class runs. He served in the Australian Army during World War II and his later career was affected by the shell shock that he suffered whilst serving in North Africa.

== Early life and career ==
Robinson was born at Stockton in New South Wales in 1914. He played club cricket in Newcastle before being spotted at the age of 16 and playing for New South Wales Country and Colts sides in the early 1930s. He made his first-class debut for the state side in a December 1934 Sheffield Shield match against South Australia at the Adelaide Oval. Considered by critics to be "the greatest natural cricketer since Victor Trumper" (Note: Trumper is generally considered to be the most stylish and versatile batsman of the Golden Age of cricket.) and by others as a "brilliant stylist", he headed the New South Wales batting averages in his second season, averaging 61.3 runs per innings.

A series of "heavy scores" made "with style and panache" saw Robinson called into the Australian Test side to play in the first Test of the 1936–37 home Ashes series at Brisbane. He scored only five runs in the match, a heavy Australian loss, and was twelfth man for the following Test before dropping out of the side altogether.

The following season Robinson moved to play for South Australia, making seven first-class appearances for the side, before returning to New South Wales to play twice during the 1939–40 season. During World War II he served in the Australian Army between 1940 and 1943, giving his occupation as a mechanic on his enlistment papers. He served in 6th Australian Division in North Africa and the Middle East and played cricket for an Australian Imperial Forces side in Egypt in October 1941. After suffering from shell shock he was deemed medically unfit for service and returned to Australia, where he played more cricket at Sydney for an Australian Services side in December 1942, before being discharged in March 1943.

== Post-war career in New Zealand ==
After his discharge Robinson found it difficult to secure accommodation for his wife and family. He played grade cricket for Gordon District Cricket Club in Sydney during the 1945–46 season and later in 1946 was employed as a groundsman by Dunedin City Council in New Zealand, later bringing his family in the country. (Note: Robinson's wife was a New Zealander.) He also agreed to coach for the Otago Cricket Association, and between 1946–47 and 1948–49 played in ten first-class matches for Otago, as well as playing other matches for the province.

Robinson suffered from illnesses throughout his later life, caused by his war service, and Wisden reported that he "never recovered either the form or the style of his youth" during his later career. In a total of 46 first-class matches he scored 2,441 runs, including four centuries, and took 44 wickets. All four of his centuries were scored for New South Wales and his batting average for the side of 42.02 far exceeds his career average of 31.70.

== Later life ==
Working as a labourer in his later life, Robinson returned to Australia and, after spending some time in hospital, died at Stockton in 1965. He was aged 51. An obituary was published in the New Zealand Cricket Almanack in 1967 but Wisden did not print an obituary for Robinson until 1994.
