= Queens Wharf Tower =

1988–2018 tower in Newcastle, Australia

The Queens Wharf Tower, or Penis Tower was a tower at Queens Wharf in Newcastle, Australia.

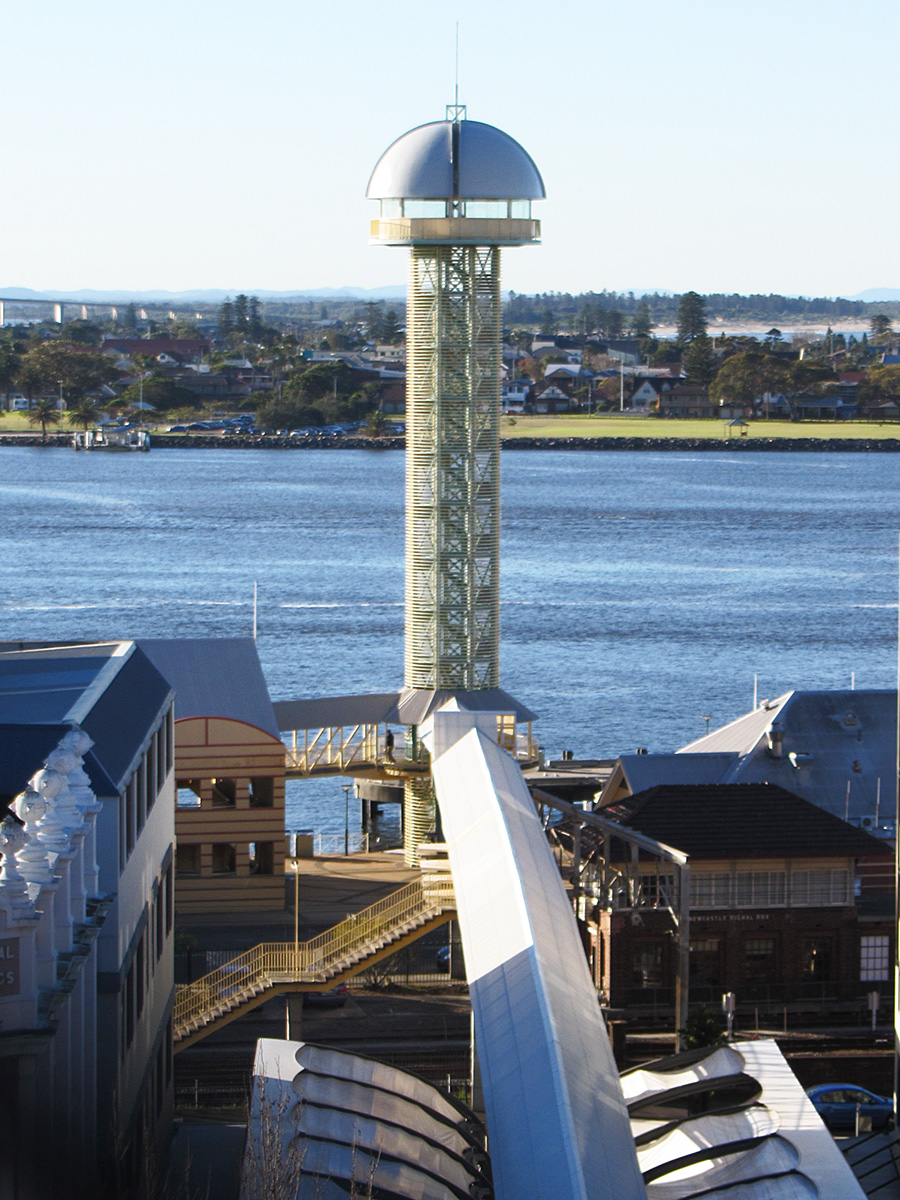
The tower in 2012

== Name ==
Officially called Queens Wharf Tower, after Queen Elizabeth II, it was commonly known as the Penis Tower, due to its phallic shape. It was also called "the big penis" in reference to Australia's big things.

The tower was designed by Kevin Snell. The tower was 140 tonnes and 40.3m high with 180 steps. The tower had an observation desk with a 360 degrees panoramic view of the city.

== History ==
The tower was opened on 7 May 1988, by Queen Elizabeth II. It was part of a $13million development celebrating Australia's bicentenary and was intended to help transition the city from an industrial city to one of tourism and recreation.

In 1999 the tower was closed for six months to undergo a $367,000 renovation which included repainting and fixing rust issues.

== Demolition ==
An expression of interest was put out by the council to see if anyone was interested in purchasing to tower so that it could be moved elsewhere, but the expression received little response. When asked about the demolition of the tower, architect Kevin Snell said he was "very, very surprised [the council] dished out the money to maintain it all this time."

Towards the end of its life, the tower had become a target of vandalism. The official reasoning to demolish the tower was because of the cost of maintenance and a lack of disability access (which had been discussed as far back as 2002) but the council's interim chief executive Jeremy Bath also said "There aren’t many cites around the world that have placed a 30m high phallic symbol in their most prominent public place [...] There really is no other way to describe the Queens Wharf Tower other than as an embarrassment to the city." Lord Mayor Nuatali Nelmes called the tower a "blight on the city's landscape" The cost of demolition was around $300,000.

Reactions by residents were mixed. People praised the views from the tower, and suggested adding street art to the tower instead of demolishing it. One resident who moved to Newcastle shortly after the tower was built said "I think I will cry to be honest, I took a shot last night as a final memory. It has been part of my landscape for more than a decade." Many people felt frustrated at the council's lack of consultation with the public on the decision.

The tower was taken down over multiple nights in August 2018, first detaching the dome and observation deck. The remains of the tower were taken away to be recycled.

== Legacy ==
The tower was mentioned in the 2001 song Newcastle by Daniel Arvidson. In 2018, a bottle opener in the shape of the tower was made by Out of The Square. 3000 were sold and $22,193 was raised for the Hunter Prostate Cancer Alliance. A book featuring art work of the tower by multiple artists called Dick Pics was published in 2018. The tower was one of the landmarks drawn in Trevor Dicksinson's 2020 book Newcastle. Dickinson said "I was one of the few people who really liked it, I thought it should stay."

A bottom section of the tower still exists at the wharf, with a ramp that leads to nowhere.

== See also ==
- Phallic architecture
