= Johnny Slade =

Australian RL coach and former rugby league footballer

Personal information
- Full name: John Slade
- Born: 22 April 1933 Stockton, New South Wales, Australia
- Died: 4 February 1991 (aged 57)

Playing information
- Position: Fullback
Club
Years	Team	Pld	T	G	FG	P
1953–59	Parramatta	77	16	39	0	126

Coaching information
Club
Years	Team	Gms	W	D	L	W%
1955	Parramatta	18	5	0	13	28

John 'Johnny' Slade (1933–1991) was an Australian rugby league footballer who played in the 1950s.

== Playing career ==
Originally from the Stockton, New South Wales area, Slade was a fullback for the Parramatta Eels between 1953 and 1955, then in 1958 and 1959.

He is remembered for his long range kicking, especially his kicking duels with rival fullbacks and was a crowd favourite at Cumberland Oval. Slade played 77 games with Parramatta in his career, scoring 16 tries, 36 goals and two field goals for a total of 124 points. He was named captain-coach of the blue and golds in 1955 at the age of only 21, being the last coach of the club to avoid the wooden spoon until Ken Kearney seven seasons later.

He returned to Newcastle at the end of his playing career.

== Death ==
Slade died on 4 February 1991, aged 57.
