= Ray Jackson (Australian footballer) =

Australian rules footballer, born 1910

Personal information
- Full name: Raymond Leslie Jackson
- Born: 2 December 1910; Stockton, New South Wales
- Died: 25 December 1968 (aged 58); South Melbourne, Victoria
- Original team: Pakenham
- Height: 184 cm (6 ft 0 in)
- Weight: 83 kg (183 lb)

Playing career^{1}
Years	Club	Games (Goals)
1931–32	North Melbourne	30 (2)
- ^{1} Playing statistics correct to the end of 1932.

Raymond Leslie Jackson (2 December 1910 – 25 December 1968) was an Australian rules footballer who played with North Melbourne in the Victorian Football League (VFL).

== Family ==
The son of James John Jackson (1881–1948) and Margaret Annie Jackson (1885–1969), née Sutton, Raymond Leslie Jackson was born at Stockton, New South Wales on 2 December 1910.

He married Roma Reid (1921–2014) in 1943.

== Death ==
He died at Prince Henry's Hospital in South Melbourne on 25 December 1968.
