= Stockton Bridge =

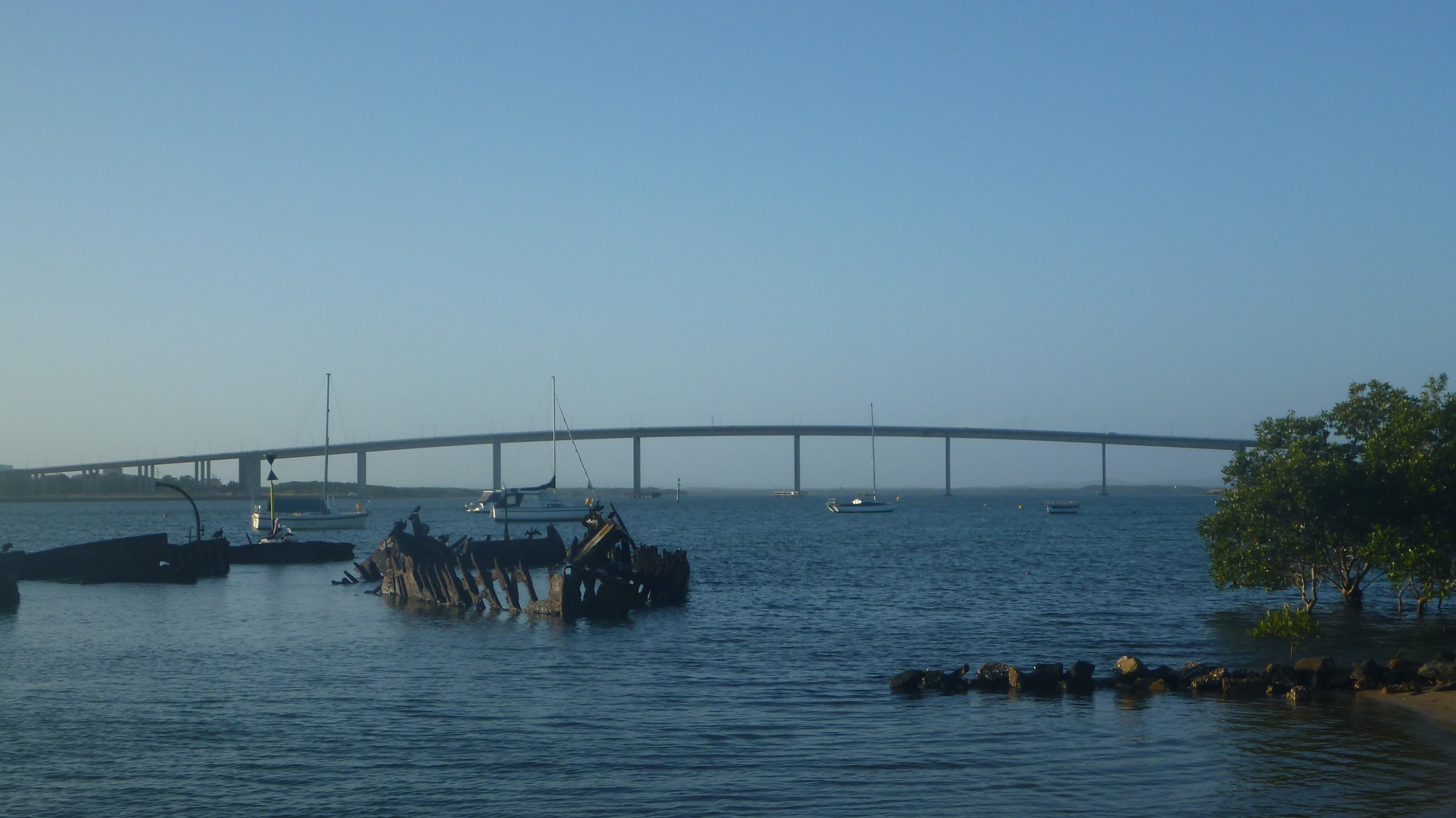
- Stockton Bridge from Stockton
- Coordinates: 32°53′4.6″S 151°47′14.03″E
- Carries: Nelson Bay Road
- Crosses: Hunter River
- Locale: New South Wales, Australia
- Begins: Stockton
- Ends: Kooragang
- Named for: Stockton
- Owner: Transport for NSW
- Maintained by: Newcastle City Council
- Preceded by: Hexham Bridge

Characteristics
- Design: Concrete arch bridge
- Material: Concrete and steel
- Pier construction: Concrete and steel
- Total length: 1,024 m (3,360 ft)
- Height: 52 m (171 ft) (highest point)
- No. of spans: 23
- Piers in water: 6
- Clearance below: 30 metres (98 ft)
- No. of lanes: 4

History
- Constructed by: Department of Main Roads
- Construction start: 1968
- Construction cost: $6.5 million
- Opened: 1 November 1971
- Replaces: Car ferry service

The Stockton Bridge is a road bridge that carries Nelson Bay Road across the Hunter River, between Kooragang and Stockton in the Hunter Region of New South Wales, Australia. The bridge and Nelson Bay Road serve as the main transport route between Newcastle and the Tilligerry and Tomaree peninsulas in Port Stephens. The bridge carries motor vehicles and a central grade-separated shared cycleway and footpath.

== History ==
Prior to the construction of the bridge, the Department of Main Roads operated a car ferry service between Wharf Road in Newcastle and Stockton.

In May 1955, the Newcastle Harbour Crossing Committee was formed by the Newcastle City Council to investigate options to cross the Hunter River. Options investigated included bridges from Hunter Street and Nobbys Head to Stockton and an underwater tunnel. All were rejected as not feasible.

The Kooragang Island reclamation project provided an answer. An initial plan to build a bridge from North Carrington to Stockton was rejected as it would interfere with shipping. The Tourle Street Bridge opened in February 1965 from Mayfield to Kooragang Island, but it would not be until 1968 that construction commenced on the Stockton Bridge. A two lane vertical-lift bridge was proposed before it was decided to build a four lane, 23-span concrete arch bridge with a 30-metre (98 ft) clearance over the shipping lane.

The Stockton Bridge was officially opened by Premier Robert Askin on 1 November 1971. At 1,024 m (3,360 ft), at the time of its opening, it was the longest bridge to have been built by the Department of Main Roads and the second longest bridge in New South Wales after the Sydney Harbour Bridge.
