= Stockton, New South Wales =

Stockton Burrabihngarn Newcastle, New South Wales
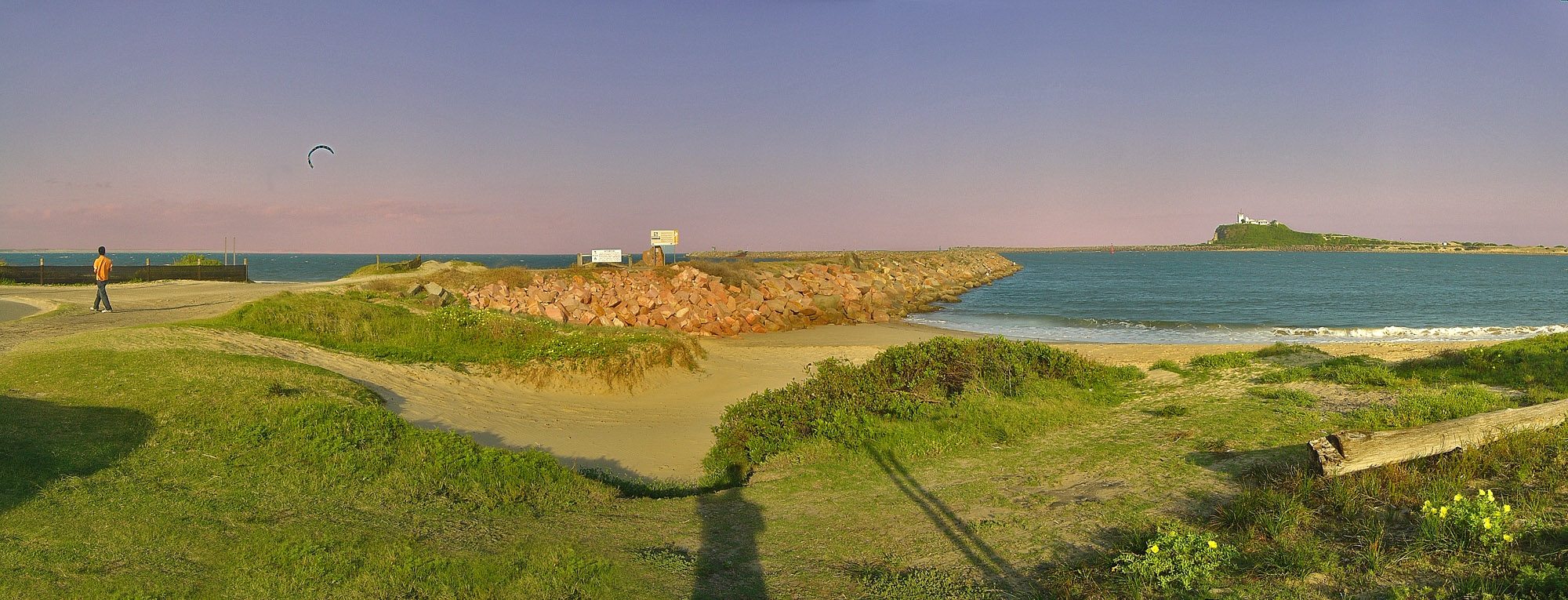
- The northern breakwater in Stockton at the entrance to Newcastle Harbour

- Coordinates: 32°54′54″S 151°47′4″E
- Population: 4,046 (2021)
  - Density: 1,133.8/km^{2} (2,937/sq mi)
- Postcode(s): 2295
- Elevation: 6 m (20 ft) (Note: Average elevation of the suburb as shown on 1:100000 map 9232 NEWCASTLE.)
- Area: 3.7 km^{2} (1.4 sq mi) (Note: Area calculation is based on 1:100000 map 9232 NEWCASTLE.)
- Time zone: AEST (UTC+10)
  - Summer (DST): AEDT (UTC+11)
- Location: 16 km (10 mi) N of Newcastle (by road); 1 km (1 mi) N of Newcastle (via ferry); 176 km (109 mi) NNE of Sydney
- LGA(s): City of Newcastle
- Region: Hunter
- County: Gloucester
- Parish: Stockton
- State electorate(s): Newcastle
- Federal division(s): Newcastle
Mean max temp	Mean min temp	Annual rainfall
21.8 °C; 71 °F	14.2 °C; 58 °F	1,131.3 mm 44.5 in
Suburbs around Stockton:
Kooragang	Fern Bay	Pacific Ocean
Carrington	Stockton	Pacific Ocean
Newcastle	Newcastle	Newcastle East

Stockton (Worimi: Burrabihngarn) is a suburb of Newcastle, New South Wales, Australia, located 600 m (0.4 mi) from Newcastle's central business district. It is the only residential suburb of the City of Newcastle that lies north of the Hunter River.

== Geography ==
Stockton is a peninsula, with the Hunter River at the south and south-west and the Pacific Ocean at the east. On the eastern side are sand dunes and surfing beaches, with numerous shipwrecks at its north, while on the western side there are marshes, where many migratory birds can be spotted. There are numerous spots at Stockton suitable for recreational fishing.

For many years, Stockton was linked to Newcastle's central business district at the south by passenger and vehicular ferry services. While there is still a passenger ferry service, vehicular traffic is now connected by the Stockton Bridge that opened in 1971.

== History ==
=== Aboriginal history ===
The Aboriginal people, in this area, the Worimi, are the first people of this land. The Worimi people call the area Burrabihngarn. This name is acknowledged by the NSW Geographic Names Board in the official dual-naming of Pirate Point / Burrabihngarn. During the year clan groups moved around their traditional land and in the summer months the mullet run drew them to the coast. This time was used to maintain kinship connections. The traditional location for these activities was Burrabihngarn.

The river side of the Stockton peninsula was for centuries a favourite place for the Worimi to consume the oysters and other shellfish that grew there in abundance. By the time of British colonisation, enormous middens of disposed shells lined the shore for many miles to a depth of four feet.

=== British colonisation ===
On 9 September 1797 Lieutenant John Shortland became the first documented Britisher to set foot on the land that would later become Stockton. It was originally called "Pirate Point" as the result of escaped convicts who stole the Norfolk which shipwrecked on the peninsula in 1800. The southern tip of the peninsula, near the northern breakwater is still known as "Pirate Point".

The Newcastle convict colony utilised the large deposits of oyster shell found in the Aboriginal middens at Stockton to make lime mortar which was used to construct colonial brick buildings. Convicts were forced to collect the shell and burn it into lime. This processed lime was then carried in baskets by the convicts who waded into the river to load it onto boats for export to Sydney. The caustic nature of the lime and the noxious fumes from the burning of the shell caused chronic skin and eye irritation in the convicts.

The first formal land grant was made to Thomas McQueen in 1830 when he was granted 10 acres at Stockton. In 1835, Alexander Walker Scott was granted 50 acres on the eastern side of the peninsula. In the same year, James Mitchell was granted 70 acres on the western side. The entire northern section of the peninsula was held under leasehold by S. Samuel.

=== Industrial development ===
For much of the 19th century it served as an industrial and mining base. Early industries included timber, lime (which was initially produced by convicts), and salt.

In 1896 tragedy struck when a gas leak killed 11 people in the Stockton Colliery Disaster. It has become a working-class dormitory suburb during the 20th century, and remains so today for its 4,200 residents.

Stocktonians are particularly proud of Dave Sands, a local resident and champion boxer during the years immediately after World War II. Like the Colliery Disaster, the short life of Sands was commemorated by some of the numerous memorials across this seaside village.

Stockton Beach is also known as the location of the 1989 rape and murder of Newcastle High School student and Fern Bay resident Leigh Leigh. A play, Blackrock (written by Australian playwright Nick Enright), and also a film of the same name, were inspired by this event.

== Education ==
There are two primary level schools, Stockton Public School and the Catholic St Peter's Primary School. Stockton falls under the catchment area for Newcastle High School.

== Culture ==
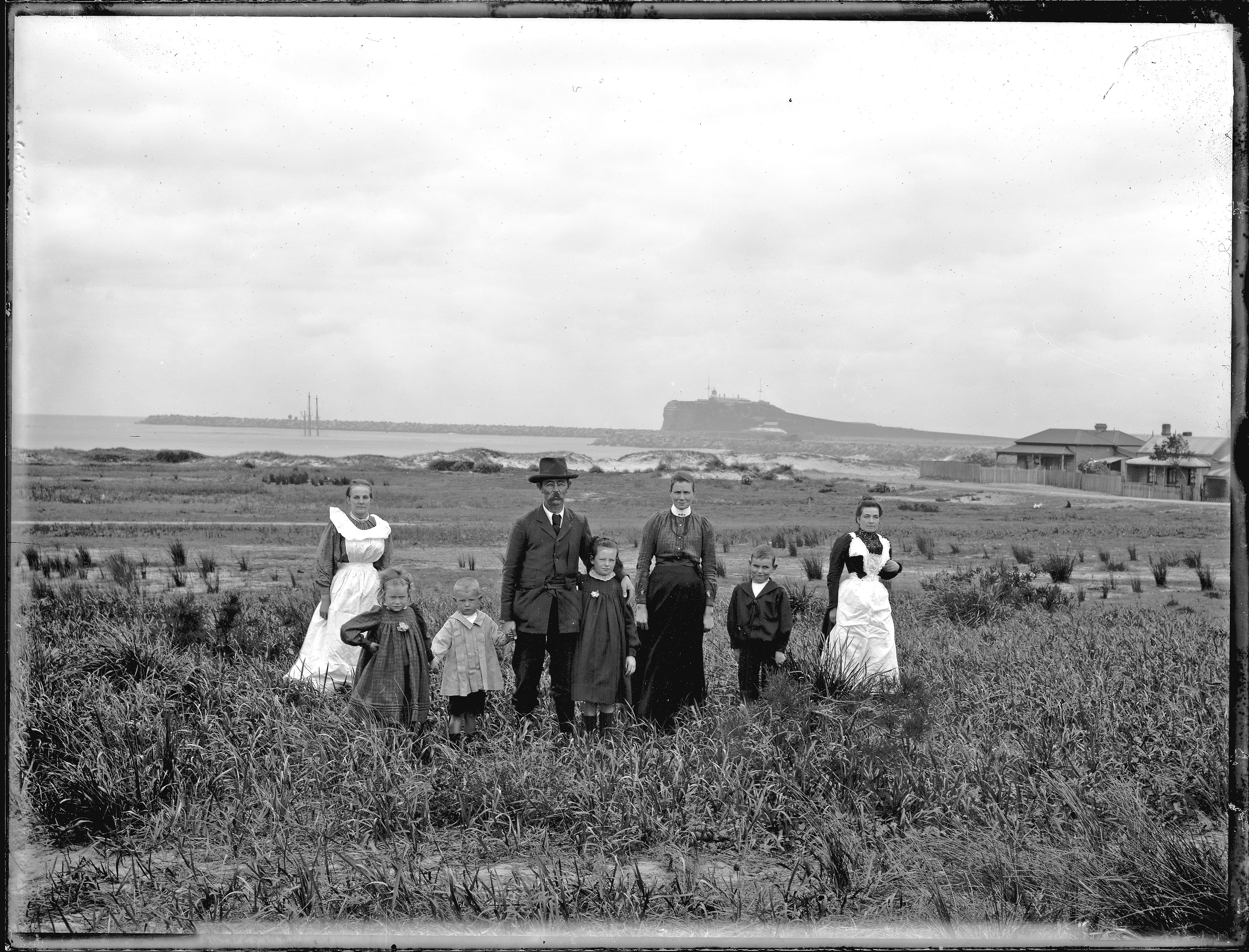
A family pictured in Stockton in 1902

Despite being technically an inner-city suburb of Newcastle, Stockton has a country town atmosphere because of its isolation. It has its own shops, churches, two clubhouses, three pubs, a swimming pool, and a caravan park. Before it was closed it also had a large residential unit for people with developmental disability known as the Stockton Centre.

Stockton was traditionally a working-class suburb. The Leigh Leigh murder caused "irreparable psychological damage" to the community of Stockton. The crime has been described as a barely healed wound for Stockton, one that is easily punctured. In recent years, however, the town has begun to re-invent itself with a push for young professionals to move in from other centres such as Sydney. This practice has led to an increase in real estate prices.

=== Notable people ===
- Daniel Ammann – boxer
- Eric Barbour – doctor and cricketer
- Vera Deacon – historian, writer and philanthropist
- Ray Jackson – footballer
- Robert Lynn – politician
- Justin Norris – Olympic swimmer
- Ray Robinson – cricketer
- Dave Sands – boxer
- Johnny Slade – rugby league footballer
- Percival Stacy Waddy – Anglican priest

== Sport ==
Stockton includes a district cricket team. It also has an active soccer club, the Stockton Sharks Soccer Club. The Stockton Rugby League club participates in the Newcastle & Hunter Rugby League C Grade competition. Surfing is a big part of Stockton life and is based from the Stockton Surf Life Saving Club (SLSC). Activities around the SLSC include paddle boarding, surf swimming, surf ski, as well as surf life saving beach patrols. Port Hunter 16 Foot Sailing Skiff Club sails on Newcastle harbour.

== Stockton Beach ==
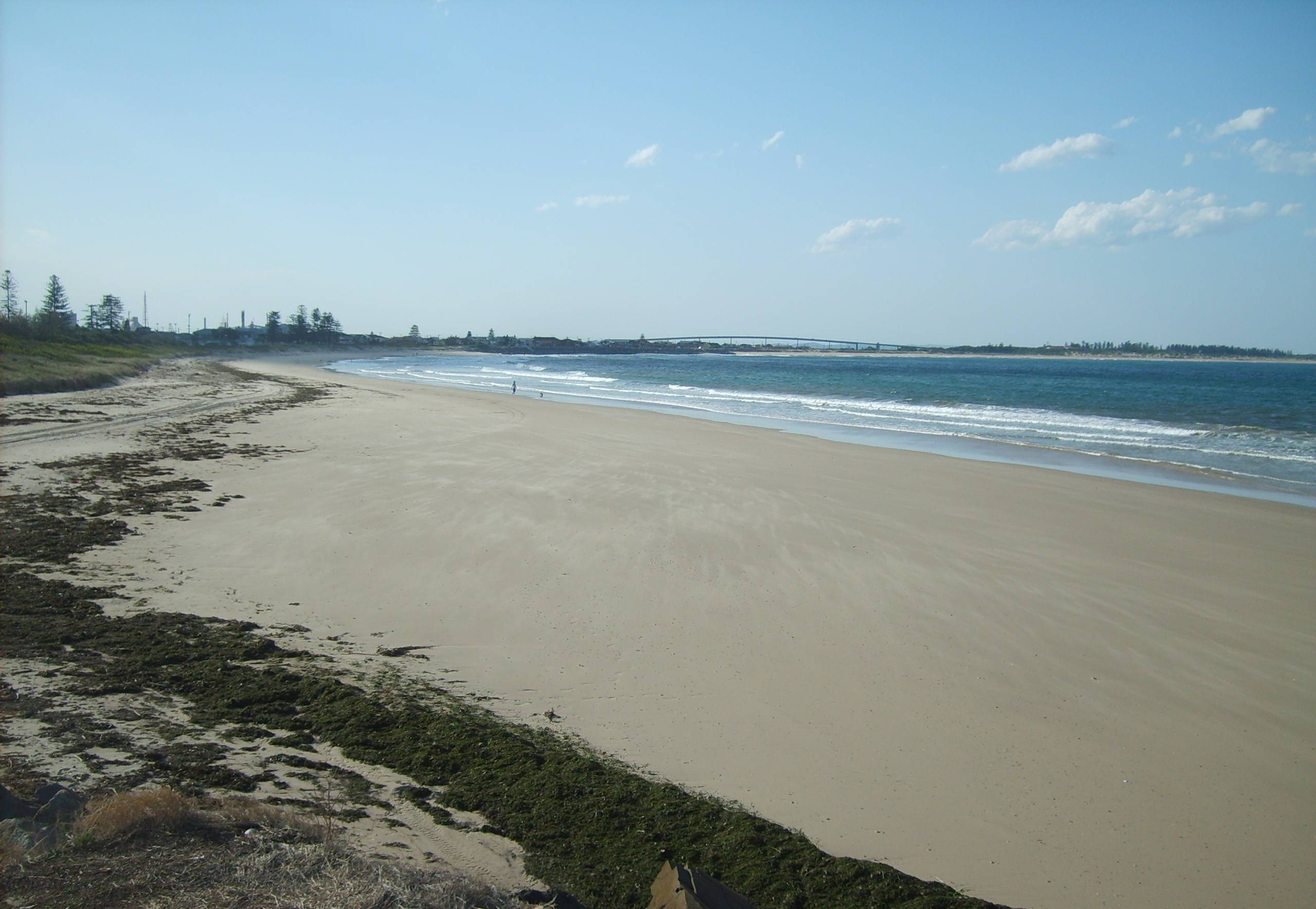
Southern end of Stockton Beach from Shipwreck walk

Stockton Beach is 32 km (20 mi) long, stretching from Stockton in the south to Anna Bay at its north-eastern end. In some areas it is as much as 1 km wide and has sand dunes over 30 metres high although at the Stockton end it is at its narrowest.

Four-wheel drives are permitted to drive on most areas of Stockton Beach but are excluded from the extreme ends of the beach.

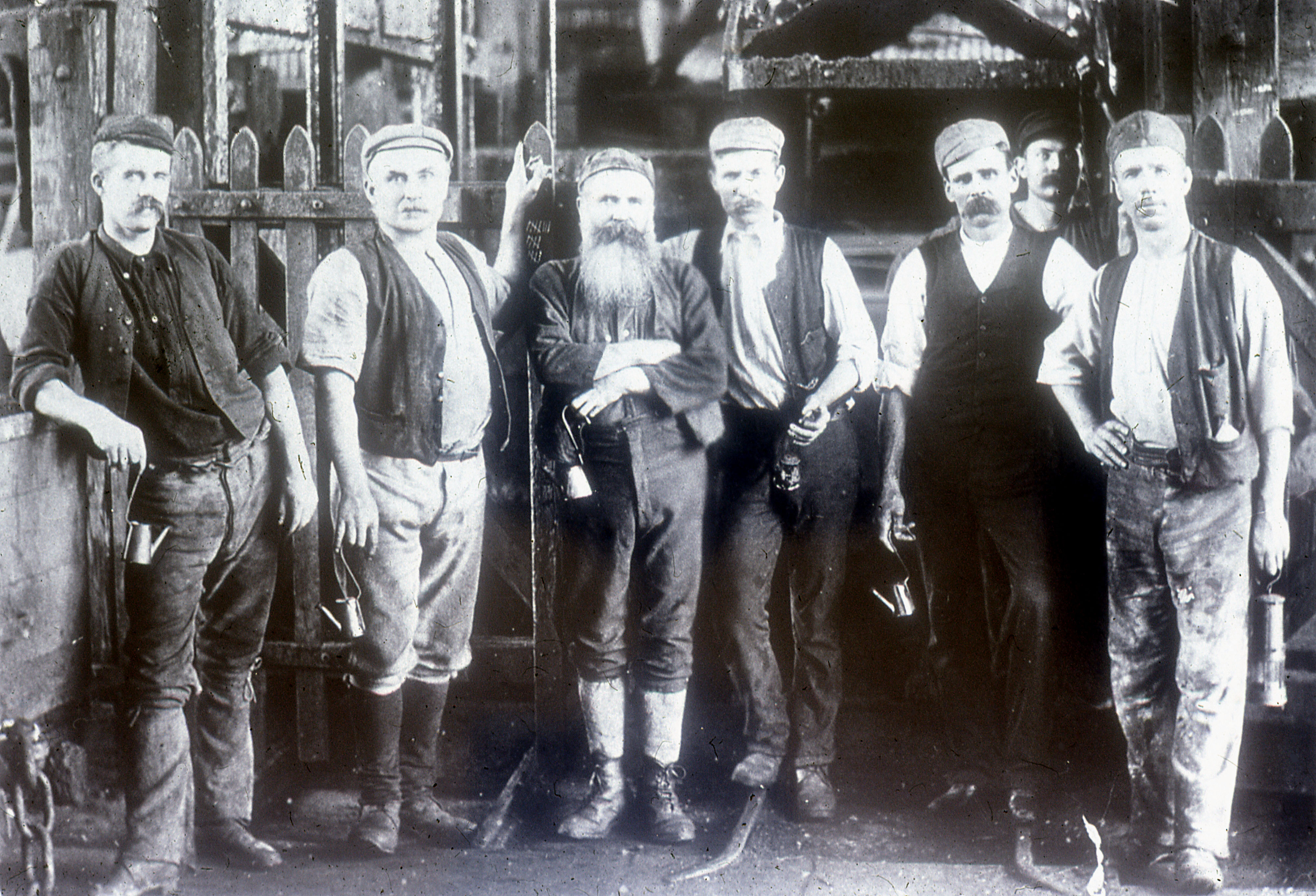
Stockton Colliery disaster 1896 rescuers

Entry to the beach is via Lavis Lane or Anna Bay and a permit needs to be purchased before entering the beach. Drivers must also ensure that they respect the natural habitat of the beach and refrain from driving on the plants and grasses on the dune structures.

=== Maritime disasters ===
Over the years Stockton Beach has been the site of a large number of shipwrecks, ship collisions and groundings. These include but not limited to:

- Norfolk (1798 sloop)
- Estramina (1803 ship)
- SS Cawarra
- SS Colonist (1889)
- SS Lindus (1881)
- Wendouree (1882)
- Adolphe (ship)
- The Bluebell Collision
- MV Sygna

== Transport ==
=== Ferry ===
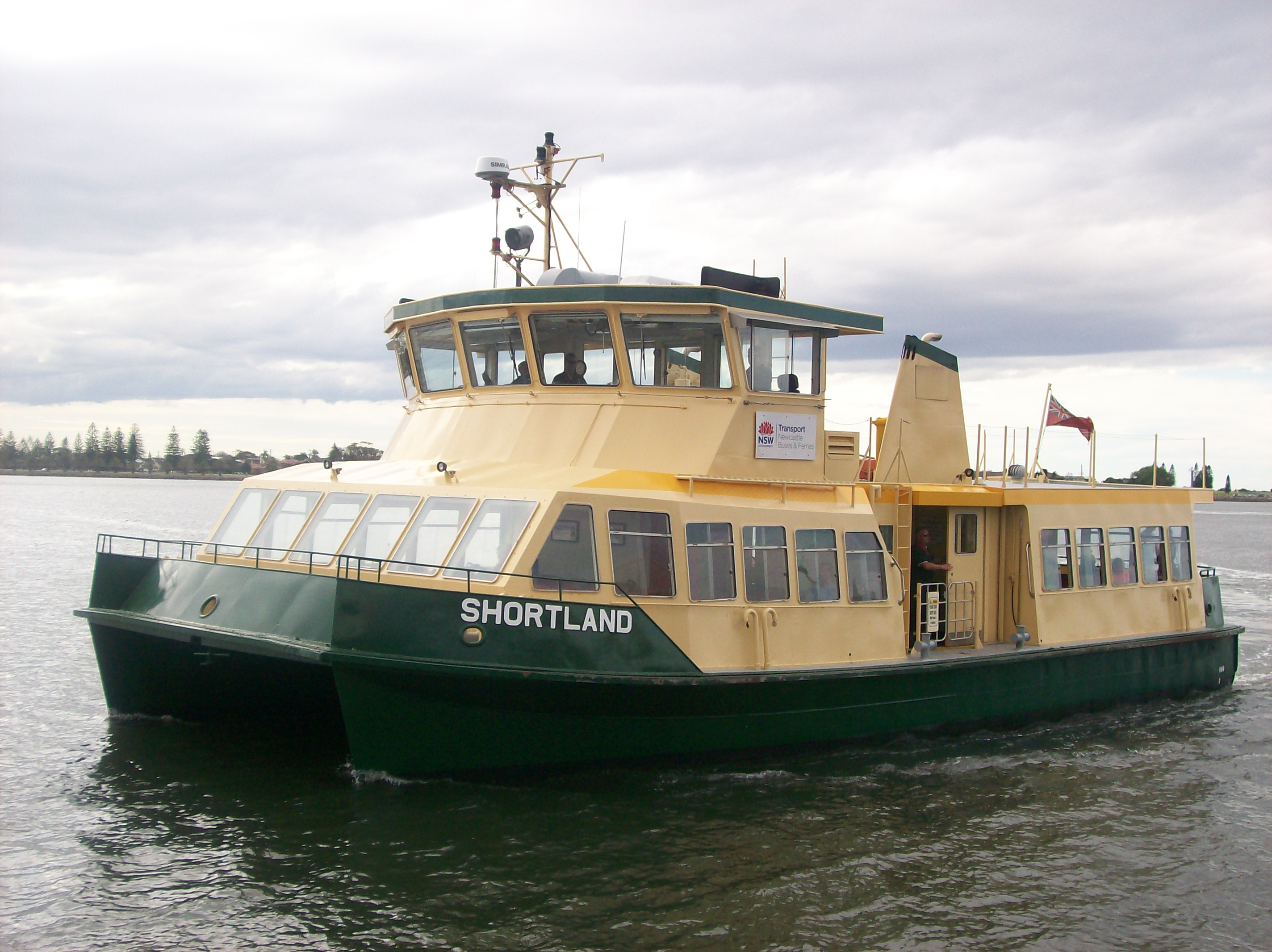
Ferry Shortland travelling between Stockton and Newcastle

Prior to the opening of the Stockton Bridge in 1971, the main transport access to Stockton was a system of vehicular and passenger ferries.

Today there is the frequent Stockton ferry service to Stockton from Queens Wharf, close to the former Newcastle railway station. The ferry journey takes about three minutes. Driving to Stockton from Newcastle requires following the many signs to Port Stephens that can be found on the main roads. These will eventually lead to the Stockton Bridge and a turn-off to the suburb itself.

=== Road ===
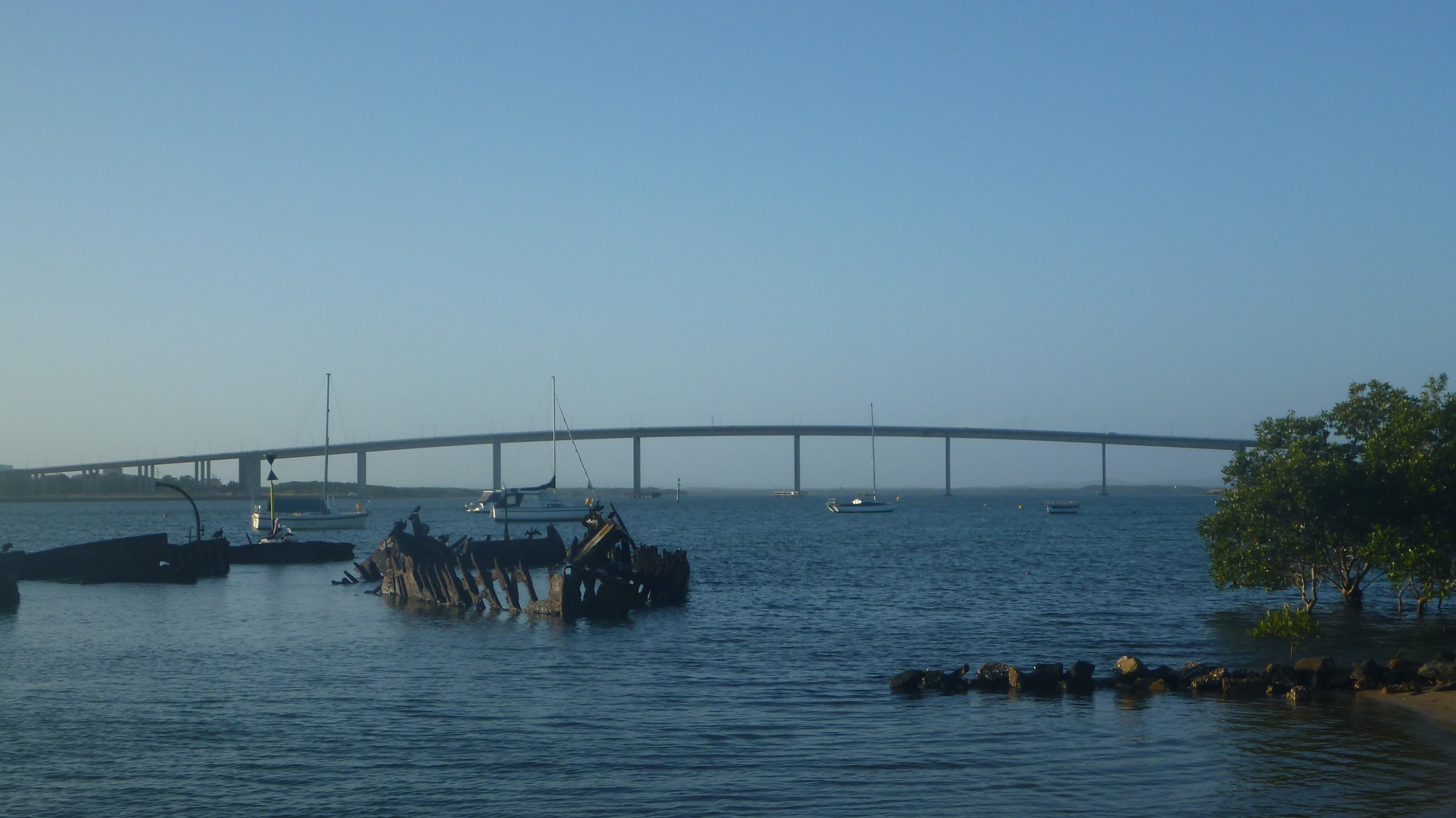
Stockton Bridge

There is one road into Stockton. This road offers two options for travel, to the east over the Stockton Bridge via Koorgang Island connects travelers to Newcastle, while the northern option connects travelers to Hexham, Williamtown, Raymond Terrace, Nelson Bay and the Pacific Highway.

=== Buses ===
Stockton is served by Hunter Valley Buses route 136 to Raymond Terrace.
