= Hunter River (New South Wales) =

River in New South Wales, Australia

Hunter River Coquun, First Hunter Creek, Coal River
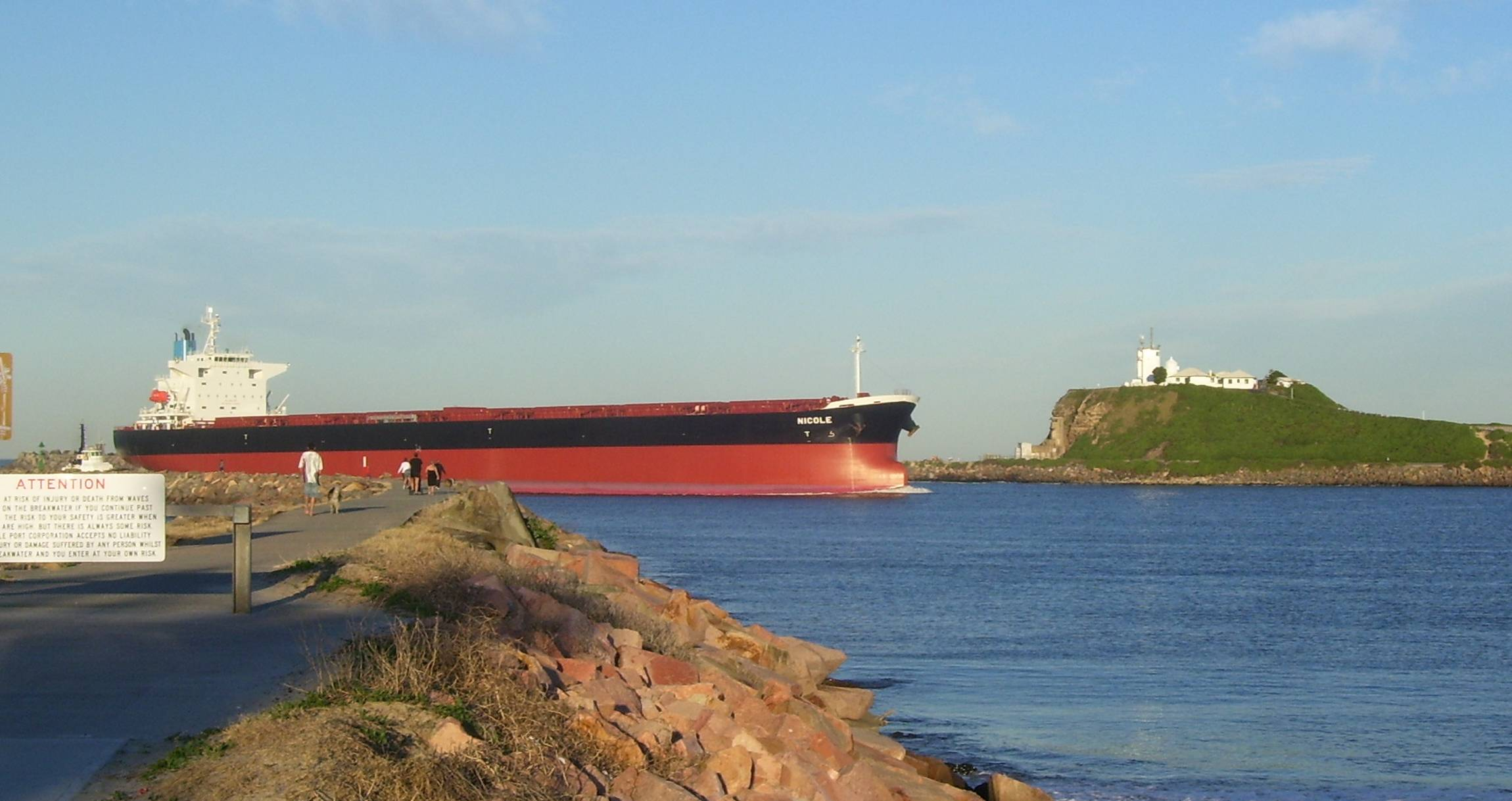
- Ship entering the mouth of the Hunter River at Newcastle
- Etymology: In honour of John Hunter
- Native name: Coquun (Awabakal)

Location
- Country: Australia
- State: New South Wales
- Region: NSW North Coast (IBRA), Sydney Basin (IBRA), Hunter
- Local government areas: Upper Hunter, Muswellbrook, Singleton, Maitland, Dungog, Port Stephens, Newcastle
- Major settlements and towns: Aberdeen, Muswellbrook, Denman, Jerrys Plains, Singleton, Maitland, Morpeth, Raymond Terrace, Newcastle

Physical characteristics
- Source: Mount Royal Range, Liverpool Range
  - location: within Barrington Tops National Park, Upper Hunter Valley
  - coordinates: 31°53′36.5″S 151°27′04.4″E
  - elevation: 1,420 m (4,660 ft)
- Mouth: Tasman Sea
  - location: between Nobbys Head and Stockton
  - coordinates: 32.92°S 151.79°E
  - elevation: 0 m (0 ft)
- Length: 300 km (190 mi)
- Basin size: 21,367 km^{2} (8,250 sq mi)
- Discharge
  - location: Near mouth
  - average: 60 m^{3}/s (1,900,000 ML/a) 52.4 m^{3}/s (1,650 GL/a)

Basin features
- Tributaries
  - left: Moonan Brook, Stewarts Brook, Paterson River, Williams River
  - right: Pages Creek, Pages River, Kingdon Ponds, Goulburn River, Wollombi Brook
- Bridges: Ellerston, Aberdeen, Muswellbrook, Denman, Golden Highway, Singleton (x3), Elderslie, Melville Ford, Bolwarra Heights (rail), Maitland, Lorn, Morpeth, Millers Forest/Nelsons Plains, Hexham, Ash Island, Kooragang (rail), Tourle Street, Stockton
- National park: Barrington Tops

The Hunter River (Awabakal/Wonnarua: Coquun or Koko-in meaning fresh water) is a major river in New South Wales, Australia. The Hunter River rises in the Liverpool Range and flows generally south and then east, reaching the Tasman Sea at Newcastle, the second largest city in New South Wales and a major harbour port. Its lower reaches form an open and trained mature wave dominated barrier estuary.

== Course and features ==
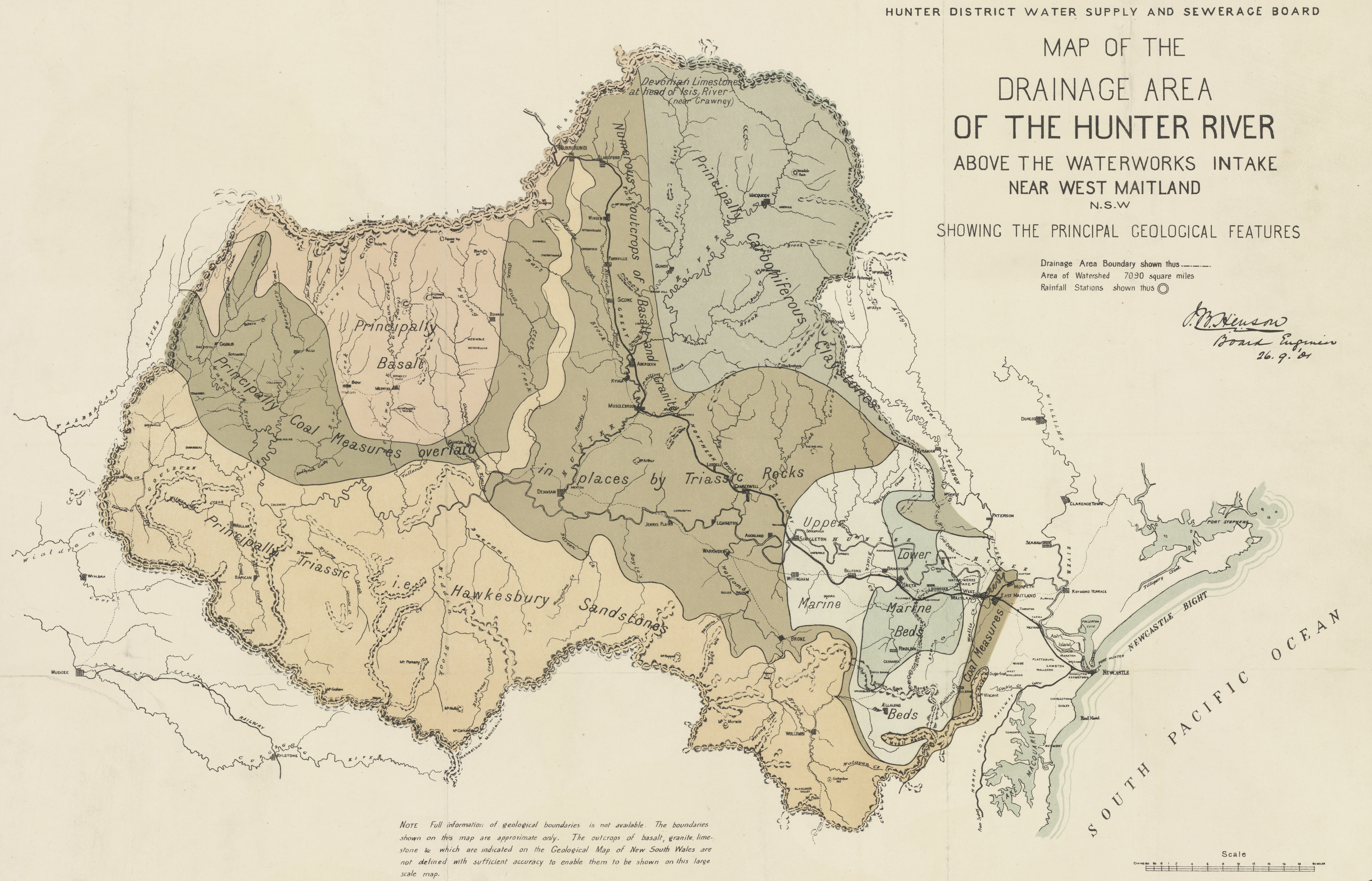
Map of the drainage area of the Hunter River, 1901

The Hunter River rises on the western slopes of Mount Royal Range, part of the Liverpool Range, within Barrington Tops National Park, east of Murrurundi, and flows generally northwest and then southwest before being impounded by Lake Glenbawn; then flowing southwest and then east southeast before reaching its mouth of the Tasman Sea, in Newcastle between Nobbys Head and Stockton. The river is joined by ten tributaries upstream of Lake Glenbawn; and a further thirty-one tributaries downstream of the reservoir. The main tributaries are the Pages, Goulburn, Williams and the Paterson rivers and the Moonan, Stewarts and Wollombi brooks. East of Hexham, the river splits into two main channels, separated by the Ramsar-protected Kooragang Wetlands that feeds Milham Ponds, Wader Pond, Swan Pond and a series of smaller wetland pondages. The southern arm of the river also creates Hexham Island, while the northern creates Smiths Island and flows in Fullerton Cove. The two channels converge at Walsh Point, reaching confluence with Throsby Creek adjacent to the Newcastle central business district, before reaching the river mouth. The Hunter River descends 1,397 m (4,583 ft) over its 468 km (291 mi) course from the high upper reaches, through the Hunter Valley, and out to sea.

The Hunter River is subject to substantial flooding, which Glenbawn Dam, near Scone, was constructed to ameliorate. Major floods have occurred on the Hunter including the flood of 1955 that caused devastation to towns along the river, especially Maitland. Severe flooding again occurred in June 2007 and again in 2015.

Towns along the Hunter River, from upstream to downstream, include Aberdeen, Muswellbrook, Denman, Jerrys Plains, Singleton, Maitland, Morpeth and Raymond Terrace.

At Hexham, the river is transversed by the Pacific Highway; while at Singleton and again at Aberdeen, the river is crossed by the New England Highway; and the Golden Highway crosses the river to the north and to the southeast of Denman.

=== Hunter Valley ===
The Hunter Valley is one of the best routes to the interior of the state with access relatively unimpeded by mountains and other obstacles. It is the largest area of relatively low-lying land near the coast of New South Wales, and owing to the shielding by rugged ranges to its north, is much drier than any other coastal region of the state. Annual rainfall ranges from 1,100 mm (43 in) at Newcastle to only 640 mm (25 in) at Merriwa and Scone in the upper reaches. In the driest years rainfall can be as low as 600 mm (24 in) at Newcastle and 375 mm (15 in) in the upper valley.

Around the Barrington Tops on the northern side of the valley, however, annual precipitation can be as high as 2,000 mm (79 in), not all of which falls as rain since July temperatures are often below 0 °C (32 °F). In the lower areas, summer maxima are usually around 27 °C (81 °F) and winter maxima around 16 °C (61 °F).

Except for the driest parts of Tasmania and a small area of the Monaro between Cooma and Nimmitabel, the Hunter Valley is the southern limit of rich "black earths" (actually black cracking clays). These are the only soils in all of Australia with reasonable levels of soluble phosphorus, with the result that upstream from Singleton very rich pasture land with many thoroughbred horse studs occurs. Around Merriwa and south of Singleton, the soils are very infertile sands more typical of Australia as a whole, and the dominant land use is extensive grazing.

Parts of the Hunter Valley are important for grape growing and wine producing. The Hunter Valley is also one of Australia's most important coal mining areas. The Hunter River is threatened by drought, climate change and proposed loss of water due to coal mining. The region is also favoured by thoroughbred horse breeders and stud farms.

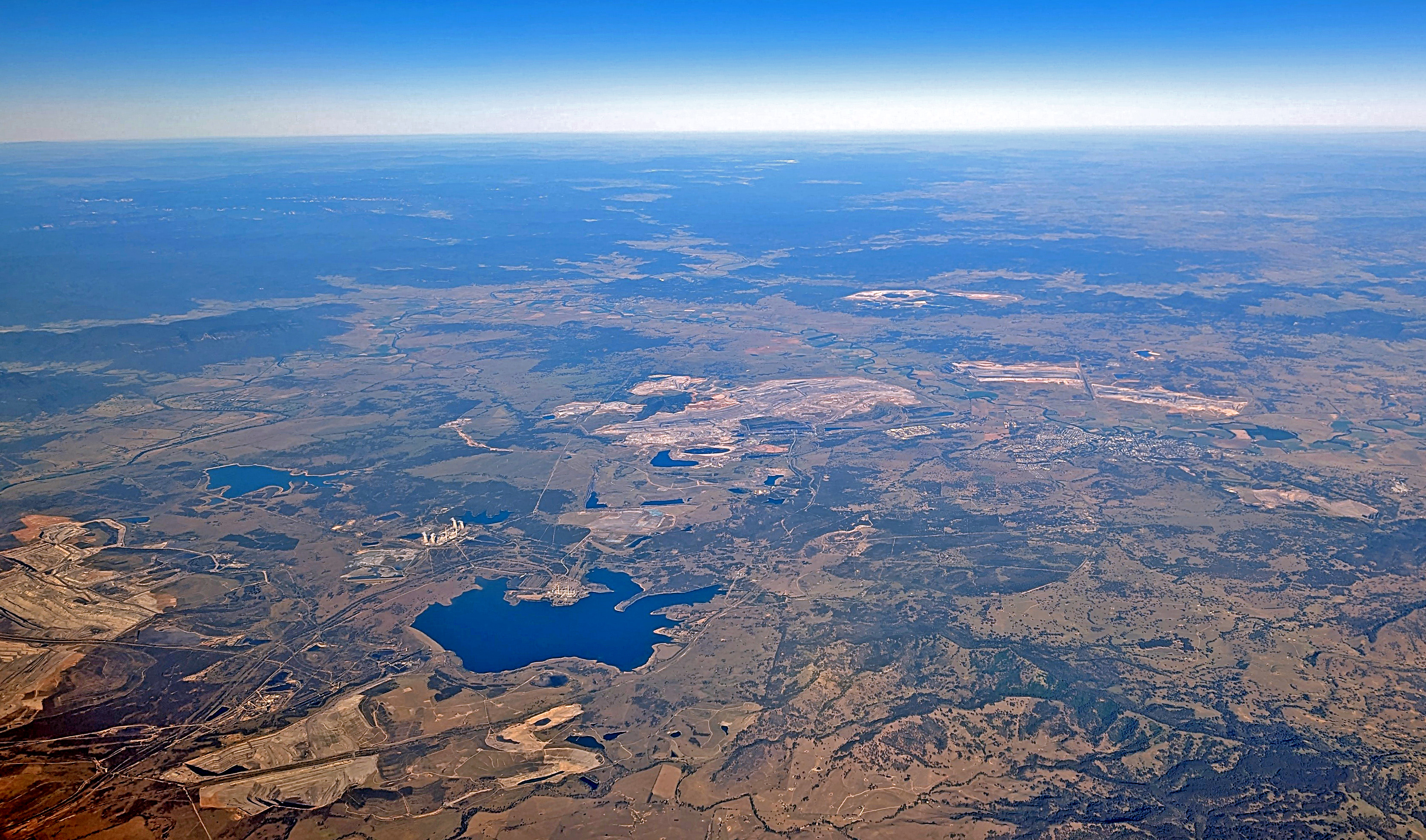
The Hunter River meanders around coal mines and power plants in this aerial view.

== History ==
The Hunter River has been inhabited for thousands of years by the Wonnarua Aboriginal people, who called it the Coquun (/koʊˈkwɪn/), meaning "fresh water". The Lower Hunter River nearer to the coast is the traditional country of the Awabakal people. Both groups spoke a similar language.

The river was first settled by European explorers in the 1790s. In June 1796, fishermen sheltering from bad weather discovered coal there, and the river was initially called Coal River. In 1797, it was formally named the Hunter, after Captain John Hunter who was Governor of the British colony in New South Wales at that time.

Between 1826 and 1836, convicts built the 264 km (164 mi) long Great North Road that links Sydney to the Hunter Region.

== Gallery ==
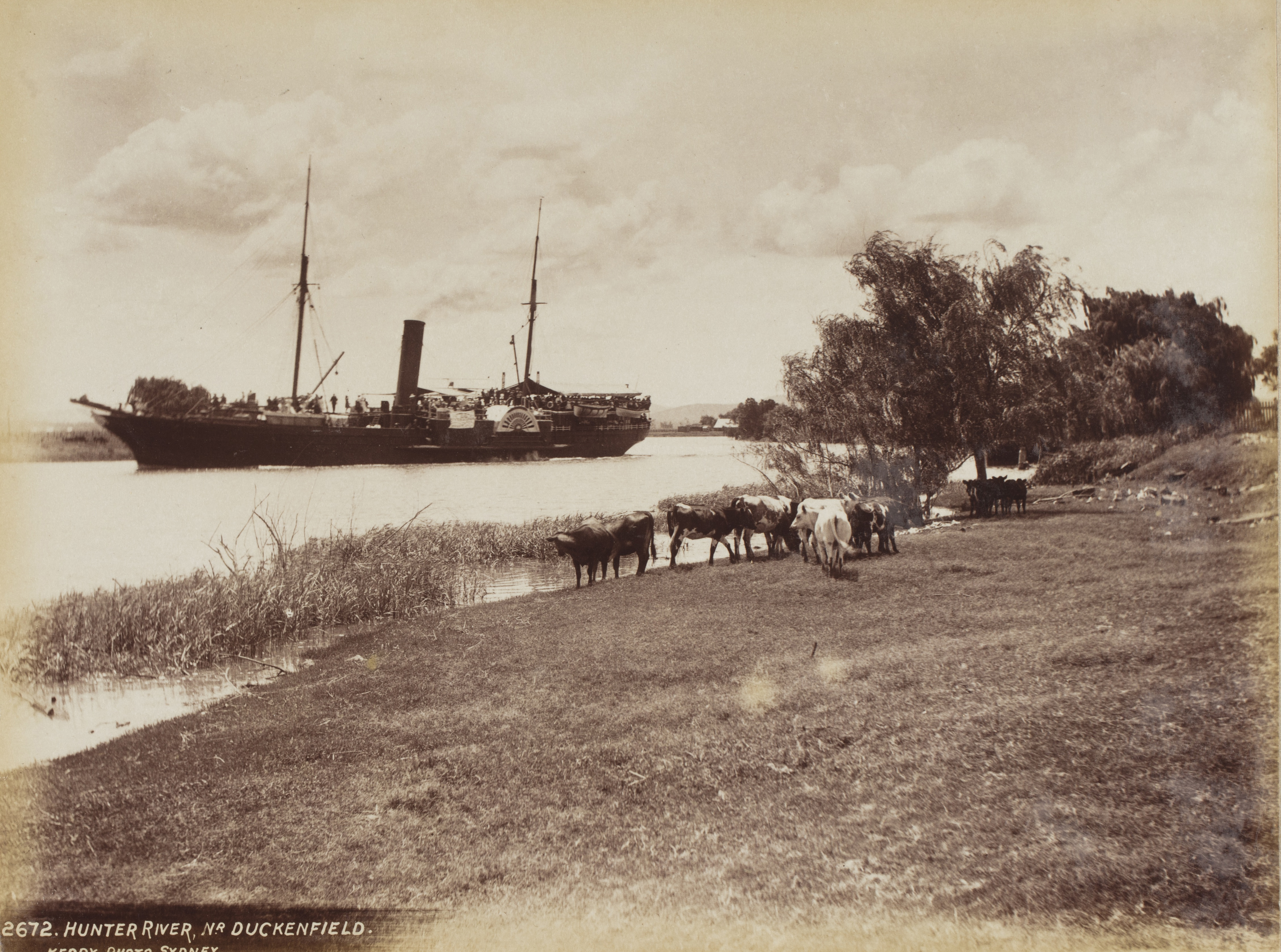
Paddle steamer on the Hunter River near Duckenfield, New South Wales, c.1890

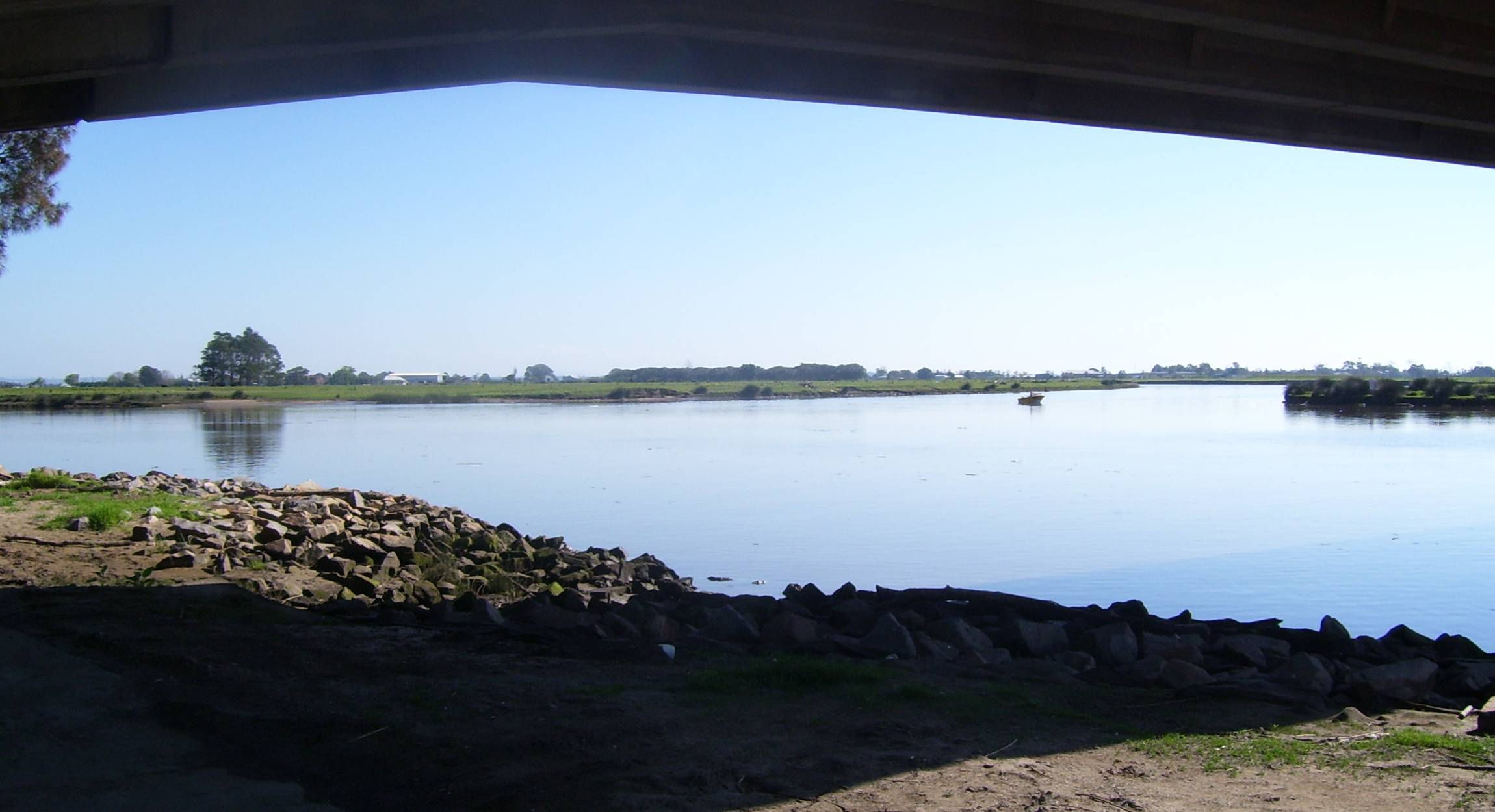
Confluence of the Hunter and Williams rivers at Raymond Terrace.

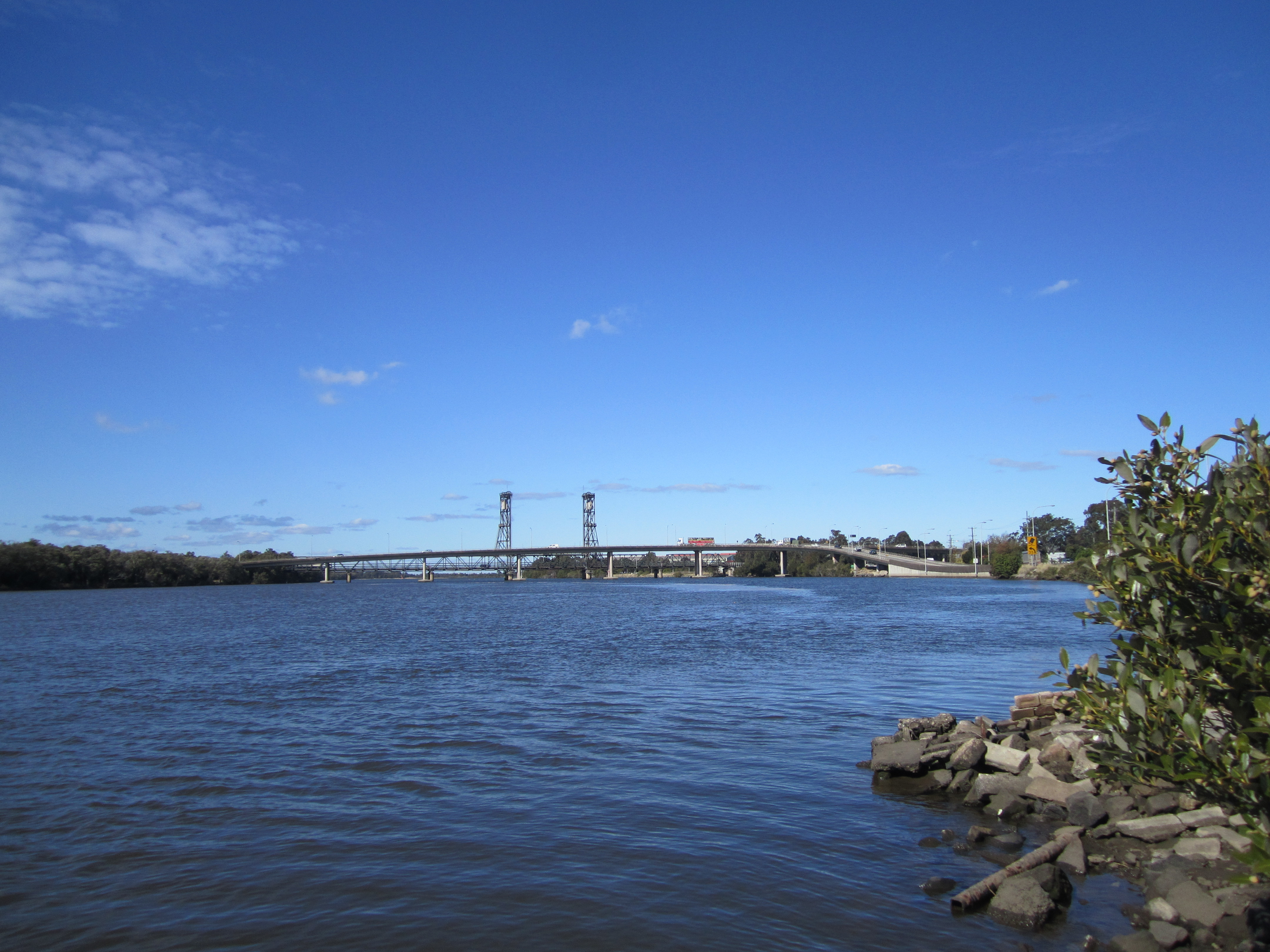
Bridges across Hunter River between Tomago and Hexham.

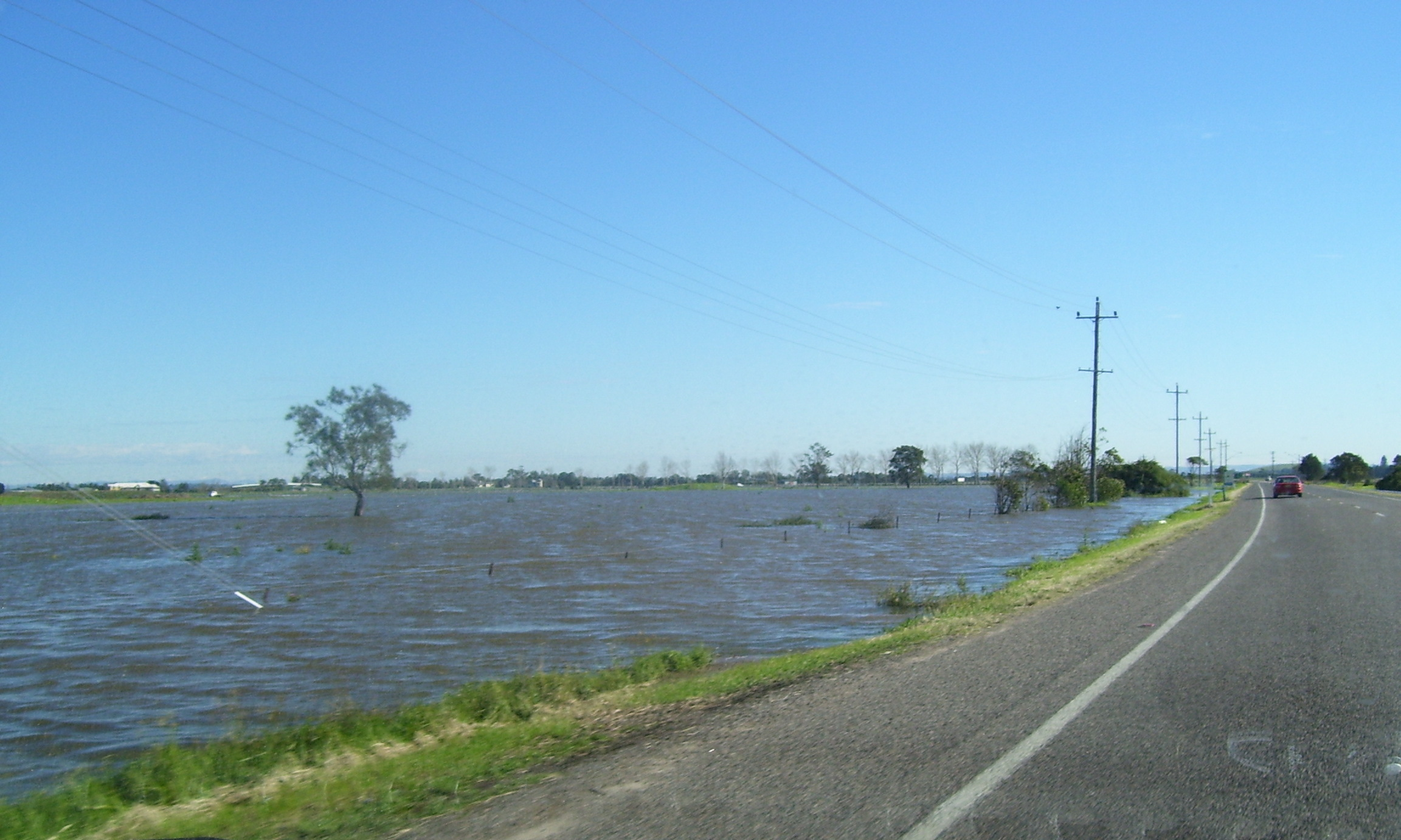
Flooding of the Hunter and Williams Rivers in Nelsons Plains during 2007.

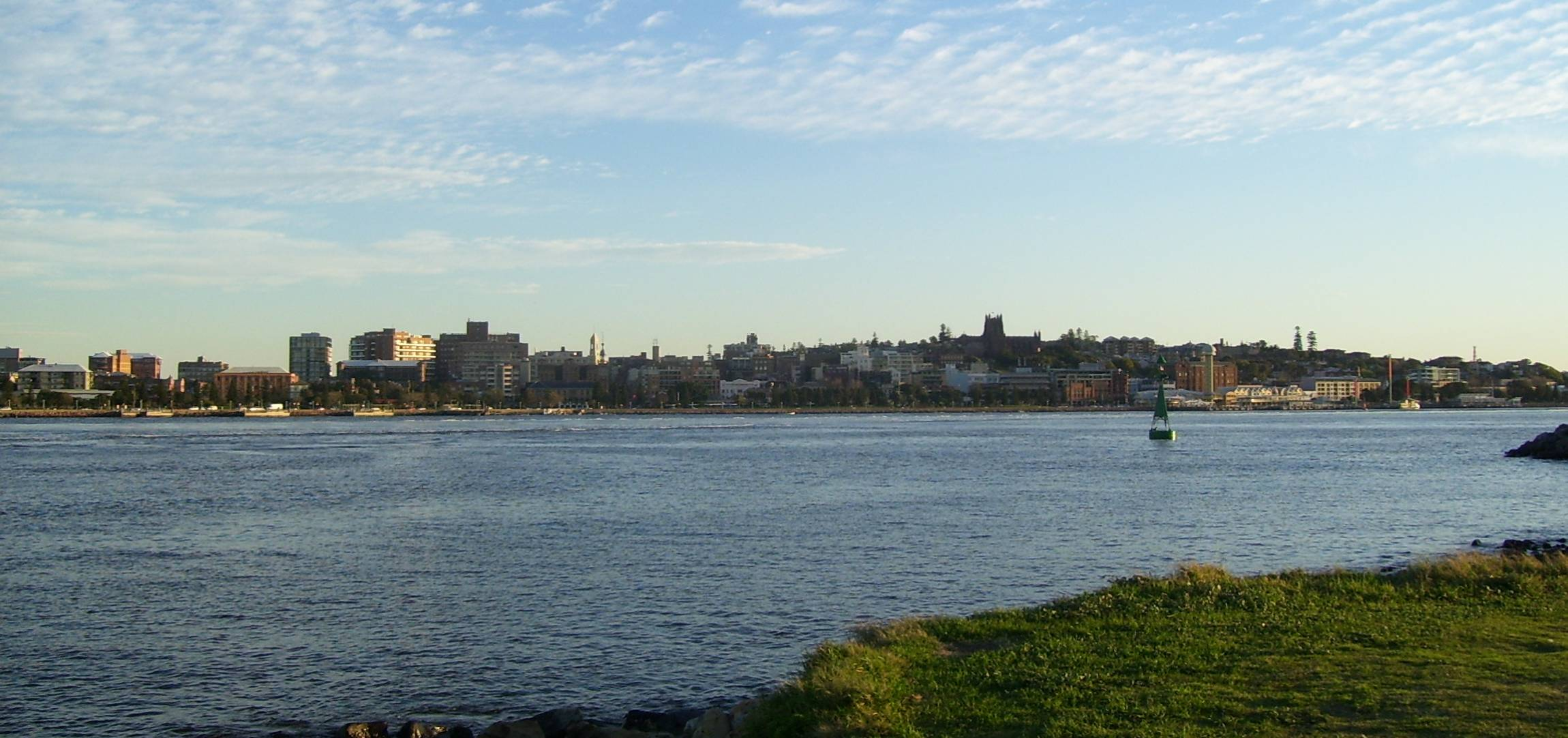
River mouth viewed from Stockton, looking towards Newcastle central business district, 2007.
