= Mayfield East =

- Suburb
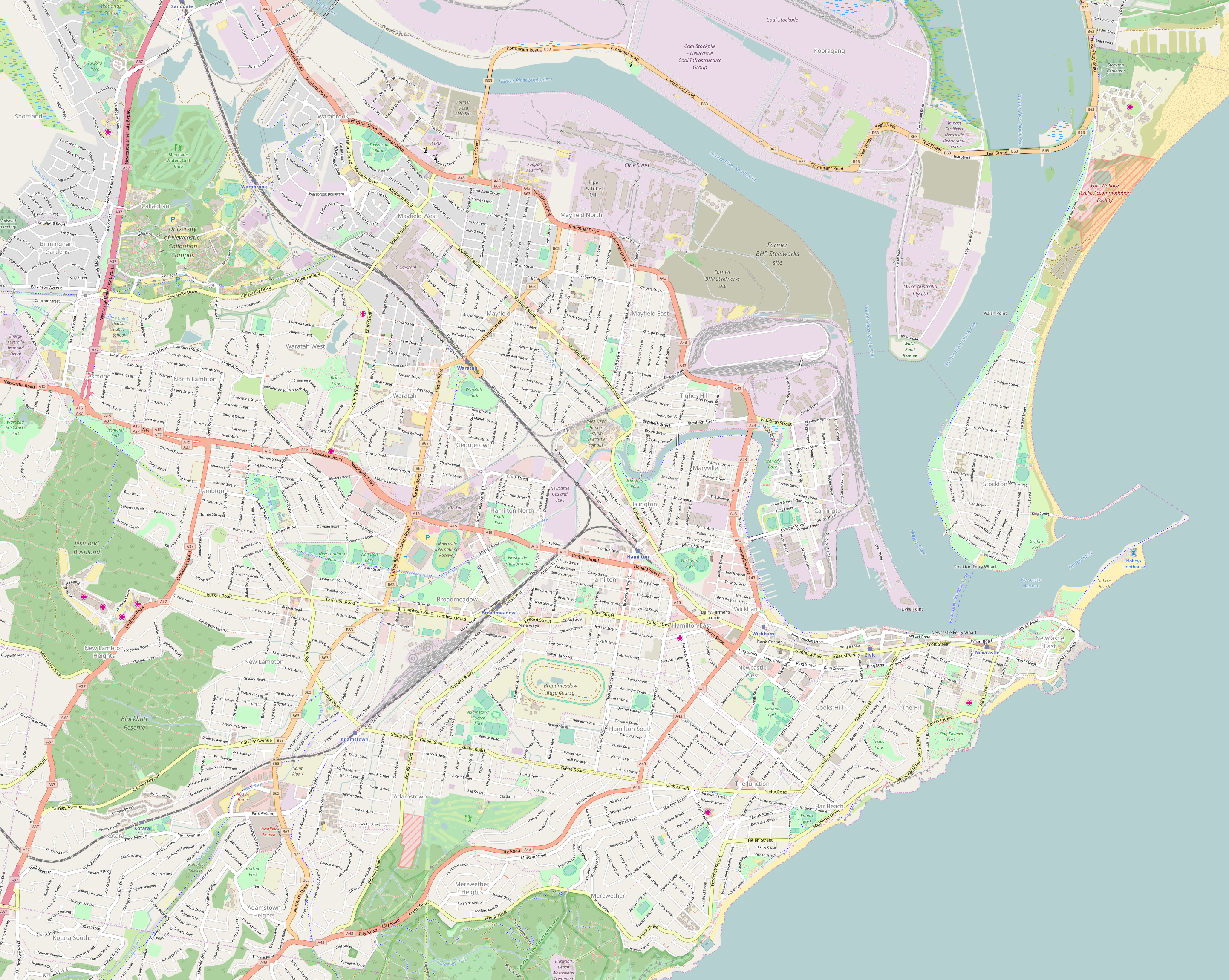
- Coordinates: 32°53′53″S 151°45′00″E
- Country: Australia
- State: New South Wales
- City: Newcastle
- LGA: City of Newcastle
- Location: 5 km (3.1 mi) NW of Newcastle

Government
  - State electorate: Newcastle
  - Federal division: Newcastle

Area
  - Total: 0.5 km^{2} (0.19 sq mi)
- Postcode: 2304
- Parish: Newcastle
Suburbs around Mayfield East
| | Mayfield North |
| Mayfield | Mayfield East | Mayfield North |
| | Tighes Hill | Tighes Hill |

Mayfield East is a suburb of Newcastle, New South Wales, Australia, located 5 kilometres (3 mi) from Newcastle's central business district. It is part of the City of Newcastle local government area.

== History ==
The Aboriginal people, in this area, the Awabakal, were the first people of this land.

== Education ==
On 32 Crebert Street there is co ed government primary school called Mayfield East Public School
