= Mayfield, New South Wales =

Mayfield
- Suburb
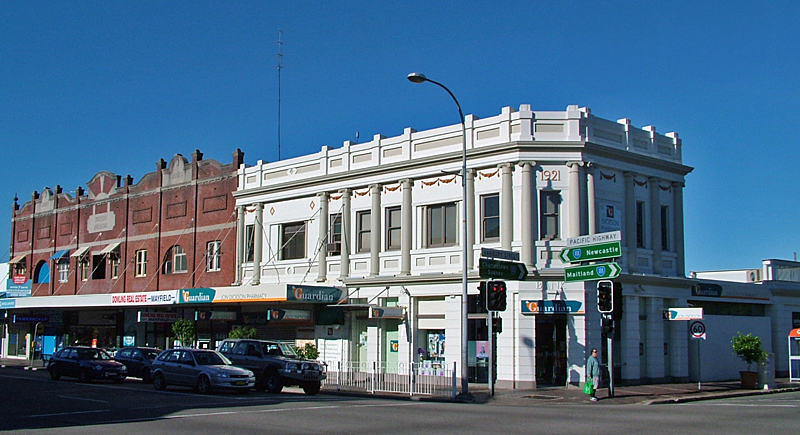
- Shops on the corner of Hanbury Street and Maitland Road

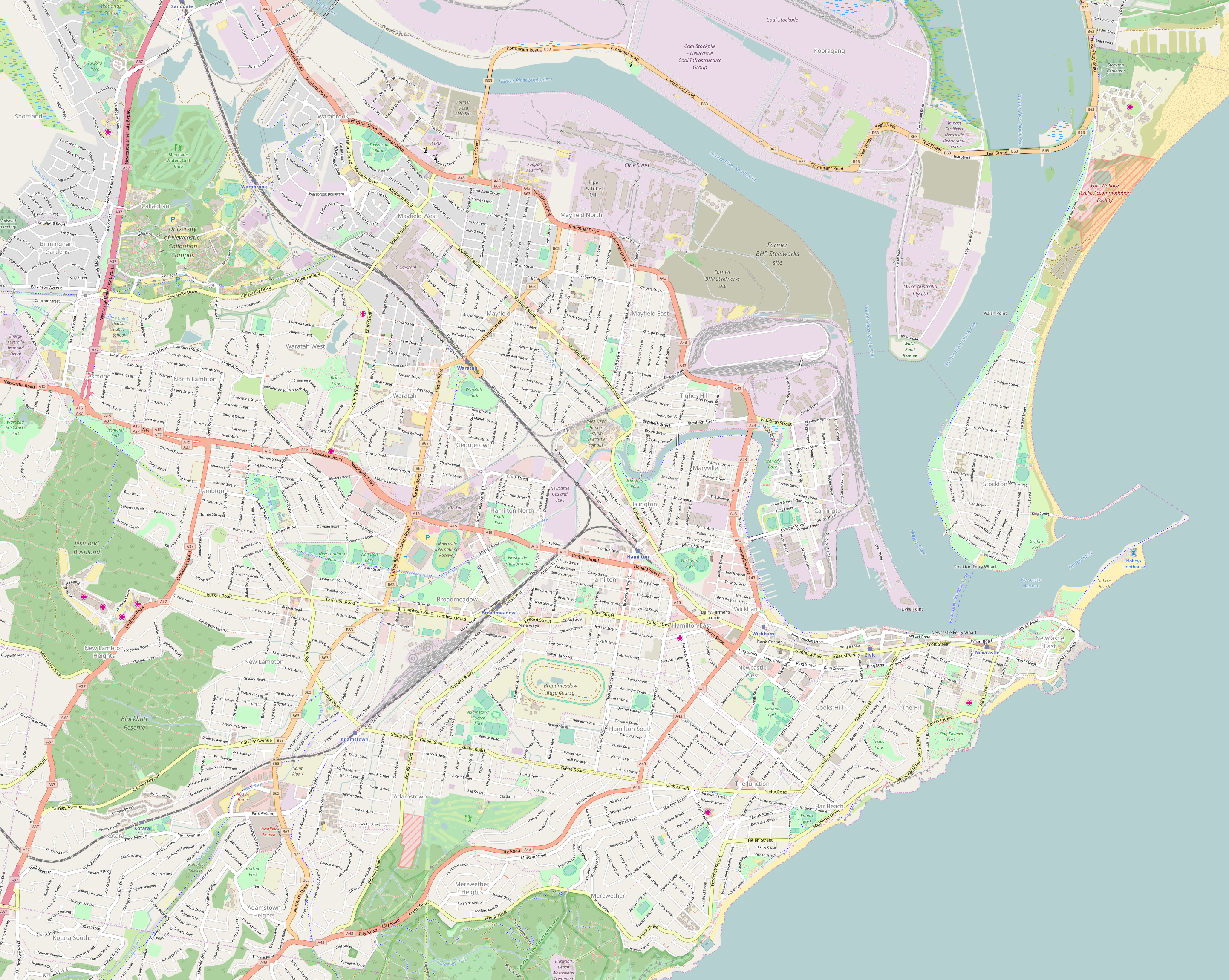
- Coordinates: 32°53′51″S 151°44′11″E
- Country: Australia
- State: New South Wales
- City: Newcastle
- LGA(s): City of Newcastle
- Location: 6 km (3.7 mi) NW of Newcastle
- Established: 1880s

Government
  - State electorate(s): Newcastle
  - Federal division(s): Newcastle

Area
  - Total: 8.1 km^{2} (3.1 sq mi)

Population
  - Total(s): 9,760 (SAL 2021)
- Postcode: 2304
- Parish: Newcastle
Suburbs around Mayfield
Mayfield West	Mayfield North	Mayfield North
Waratah	Mayfield	Mayfield East
Georgetown	Islington	Tighes Hill

Mayfield is a north-western suburb of Newcastle, New South Wales, which takes its name from Ada May (born 1874) a daughter of the landowner there, John Scholey. Its boundaries are the Hunter River to the north, the Main Northern railway line to the south (Waratah station), the railway line to Newcastle Harbour to the east, and open ground to the west.

== Aboriginal history ==
The Awabakal people are acknowledged as the descendants of the traditional custodians of the land where Mayfield is now located. Material evidence of Aboriginal occupation of the land now known as Mayfield was originally discovered by Daniel F. Cooksey in June 1925. He had located the first specimen of an Elouera, and other stone tools at a number of sites located along the south arm of the Hunter River, and of the former B.H.P Steelworks. Cooksey was formerly recognised for the find by W. W. Thorpe, the ethnologist with the Australian Museum, who, in 1928 traveled to Newcastle and officially reported the find. Cooksey documented his work in news articles and personal reports now in the custody of the Archives of the University of Newcastle's Special Collections.

== History ==
Much of Mayfield was originally named North Waratah, and formed part of the large Municipality of Waratah (incorporated 1871), of which John Scholey was three times Mayor. In 1938, an Act of the New South Wales Parliament created a "City of Greater Newcastle", incorporating 11 municipalities into one local government area, including Waratah. Until it was subdivided by Scholey and the land put up for sale, it was largely semi-forested scrub and fields. However, St Andrew's Church at North Waratah was opened as early as 1861, and fell within the Church of England Diocese of Newcastle, New South Wales. In 1924, a new church was dedicated at St.Andrews, Mayfield, to replace the ageing colonial church.

Mayfield was originally a pleasant garden suburb on the outskirts of Newcastle, and by 1901 contained a Roman Catholic monastery, and several fine Victorian mansions belonging to prominent businessmen and lawyers, including N.B. Creer (three times Mayor of Waratah). John Scholey built "Mayfield House" for himself, and had the necessary sandstone brought from England. Charles Upfold (Soap Manufacturer) built a large mansion on a piece of land in Crebert Street, North Waratah (now called Mayfield), given to him by his friend Scholey. It was later sold to biscuit manufacturer, William Arnott who named the mansion "Arnott Holme". Arnott then sold it in 1898 to Isaac Winn, owner of the big Newcastle department store. Winn renamed the mansion "Winn Court". BHP constructed, in the early 1920s, a very fine mansion in Crebert Street (named after Peter Crebert [1825–1895], an immigrant from Wiesbaden in Germany), with extensive gardens, for their General Manager. Now privately owned and named The Bella Vista, it is used as a weddings and functions centre.

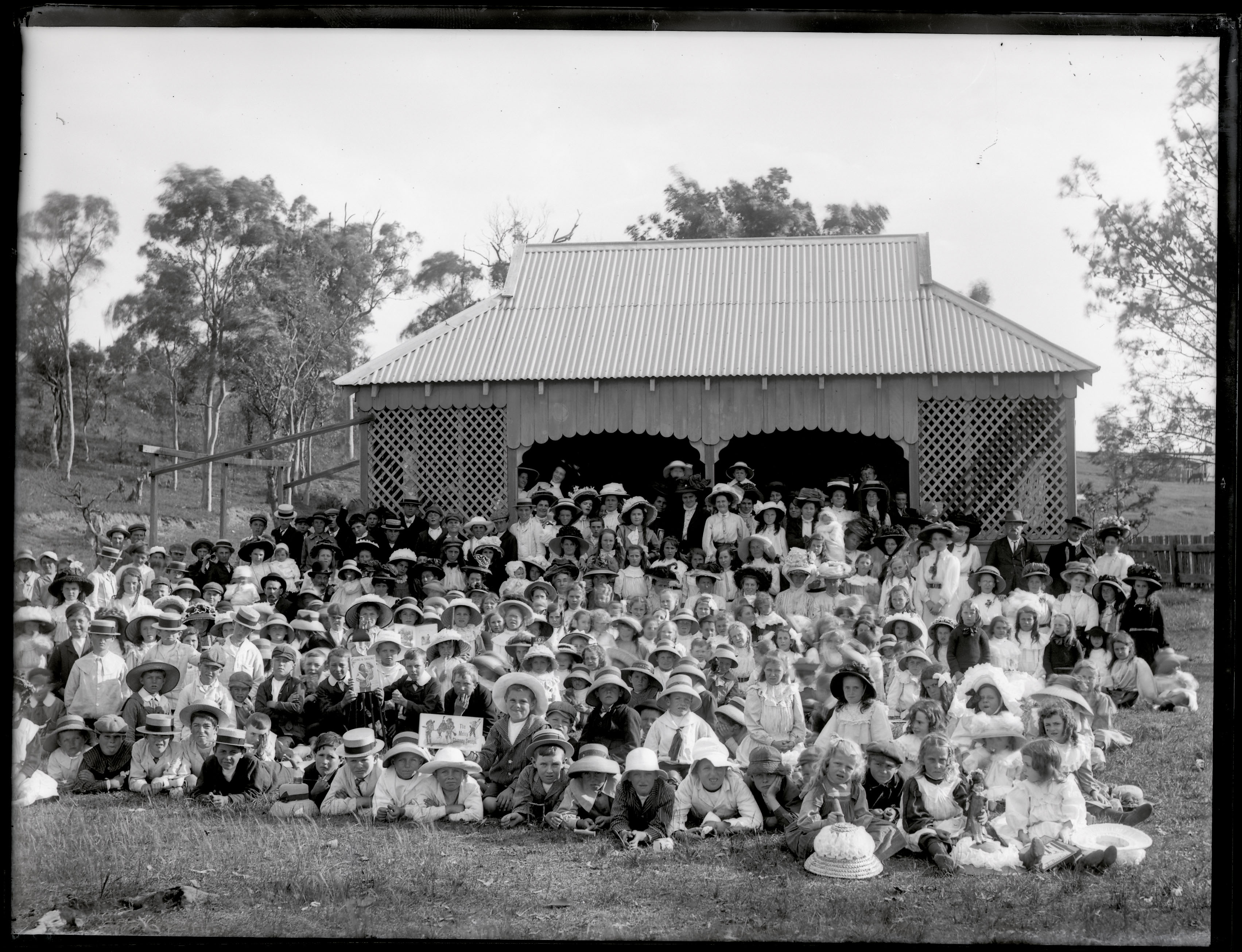
Mayfield East Public School, 9 October 1909

== Gallery ==
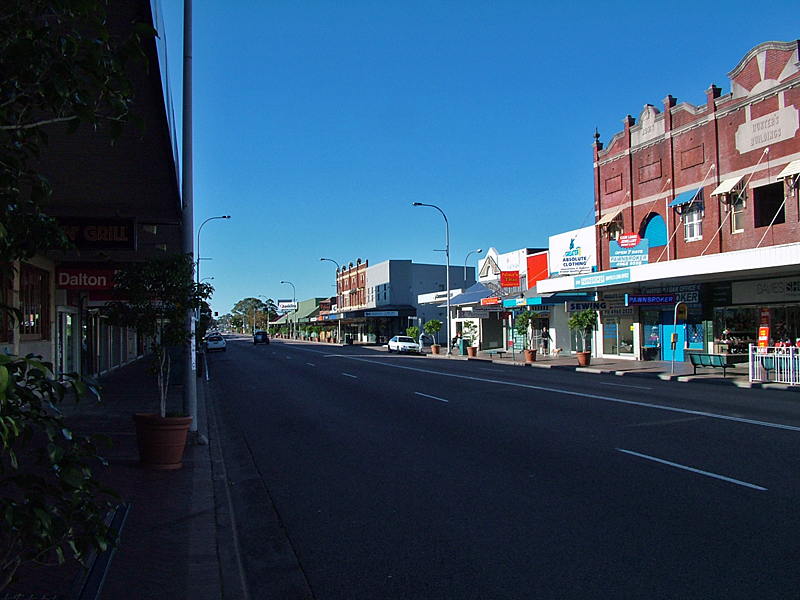
Shopping district along Maitland Road

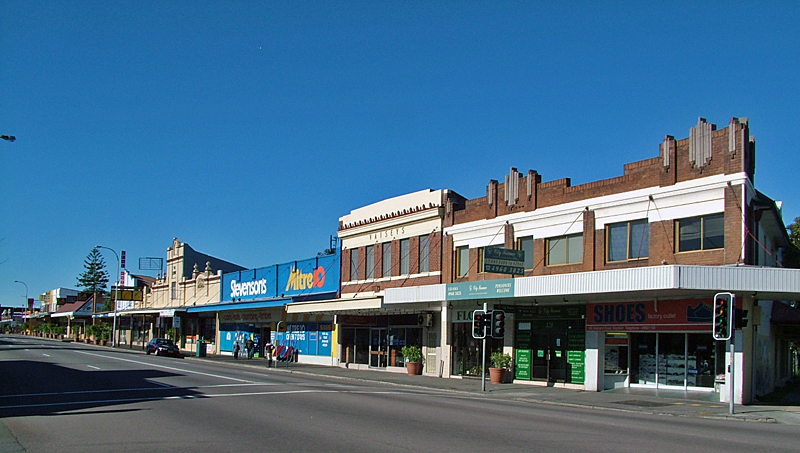
Shopping district along Maitland Road

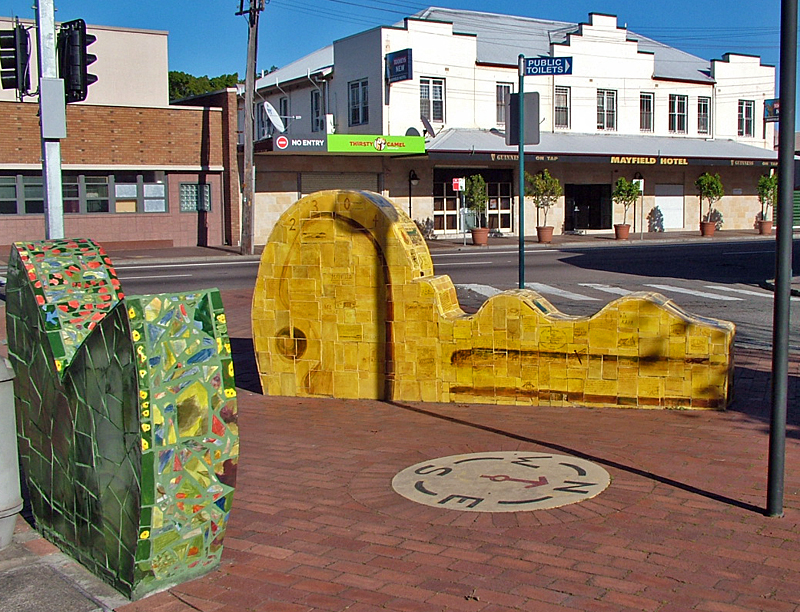
History of Mayfield mosaic located on the corner of Hanbury Street and Maitland Road

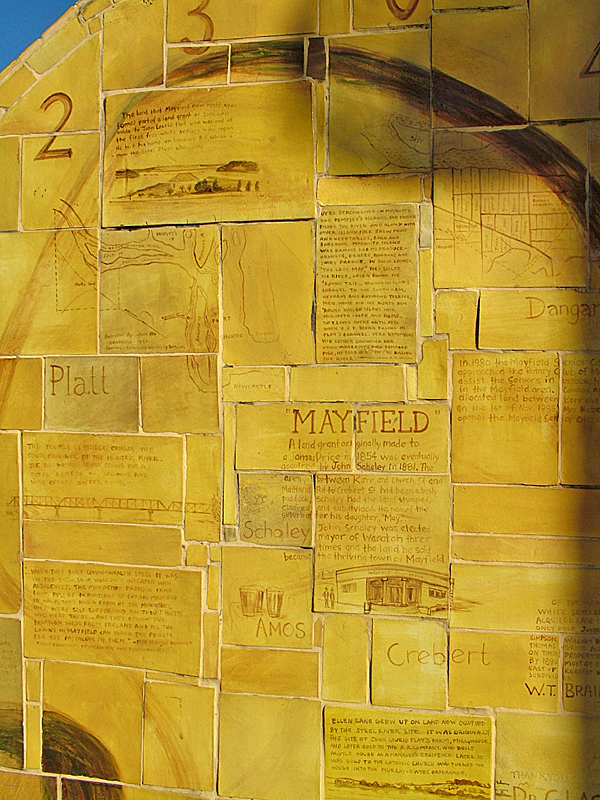
A closeup of the History of Mayfield mosaic located on the corner of Hanbury Street and Maitland Road

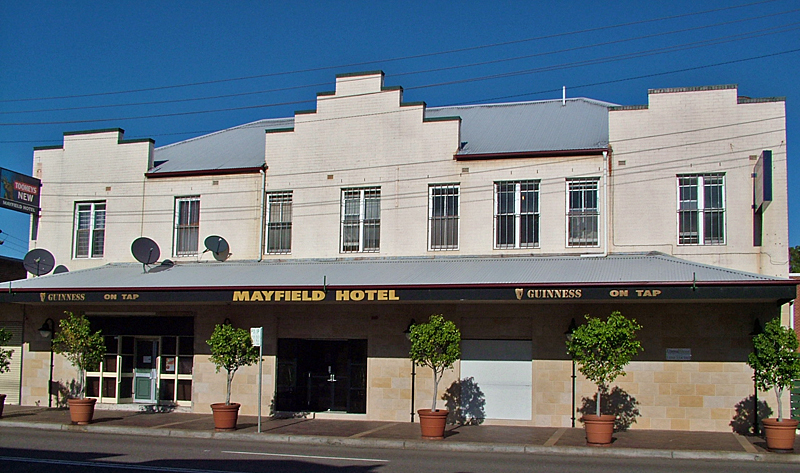
The Mayfield Hotel on Maitland Road

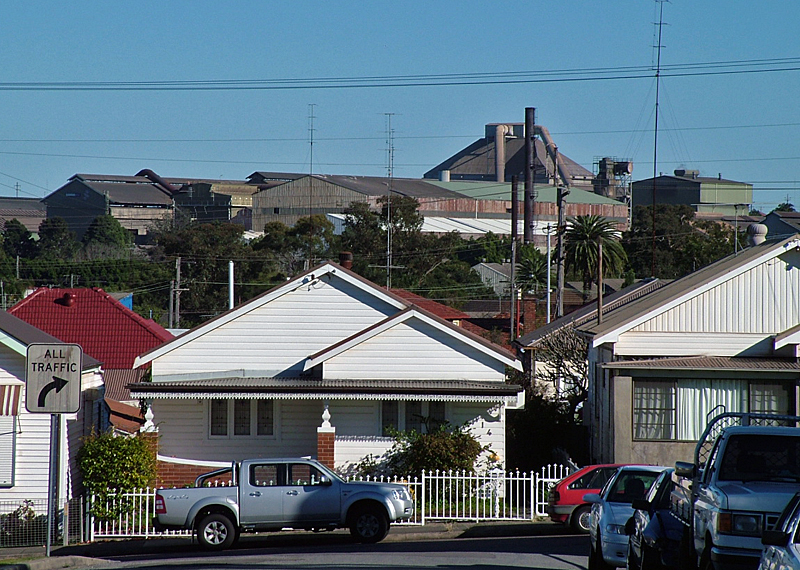
Smorgon Steel works located in the residential area of Mayfield

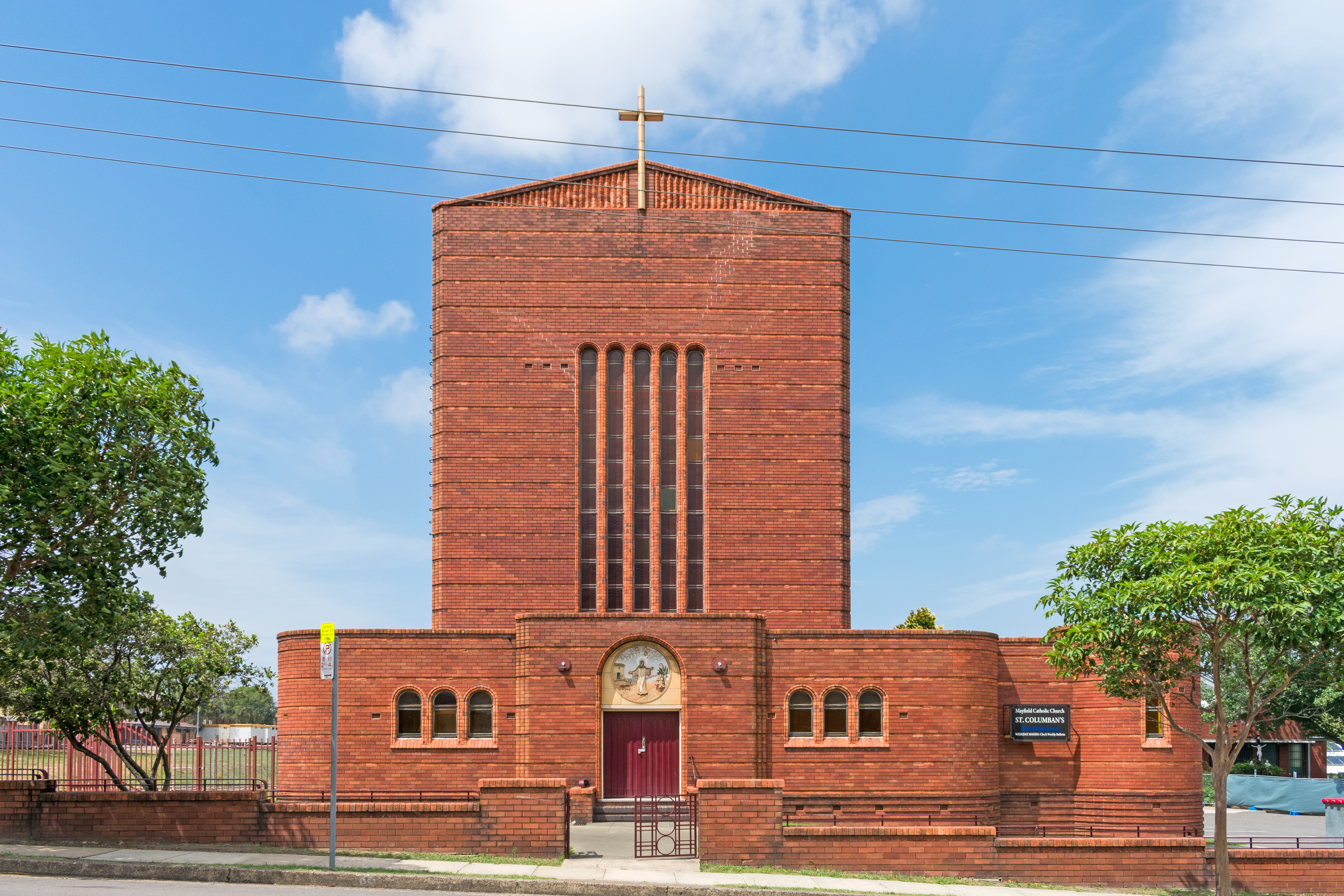
Mayfield Catholic Church of St Columban's.

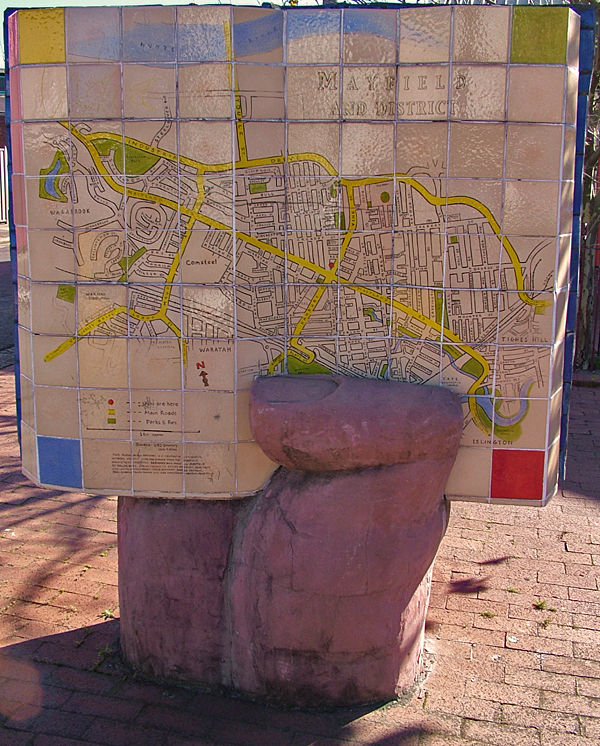
A mosaic map of Mayfield located on the corner of Hanbury Street and Maitland Road

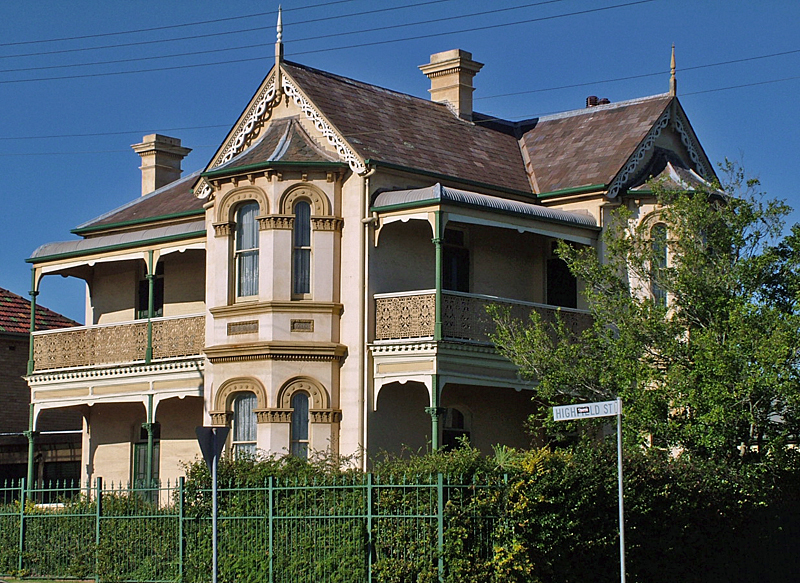
Winahra is a grand old Victorian style house located on the corner of Hanbury Street and Highfield Street.

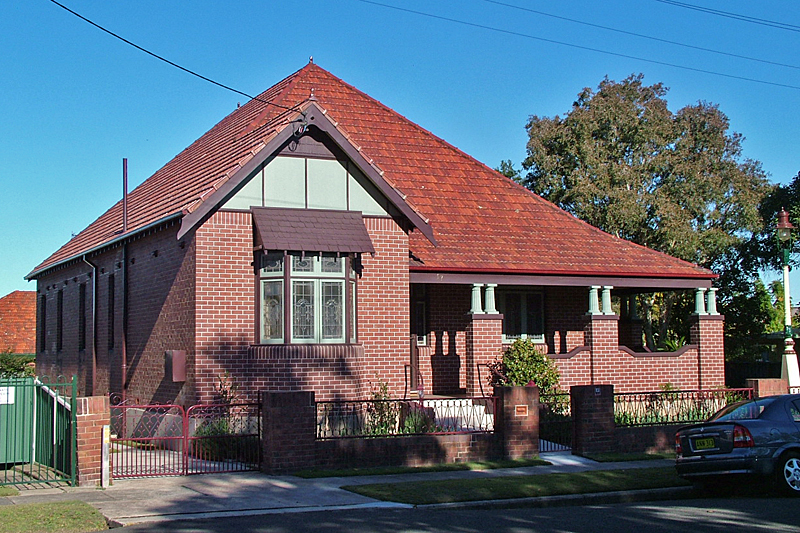
A well maintained old house located on Highfield Street

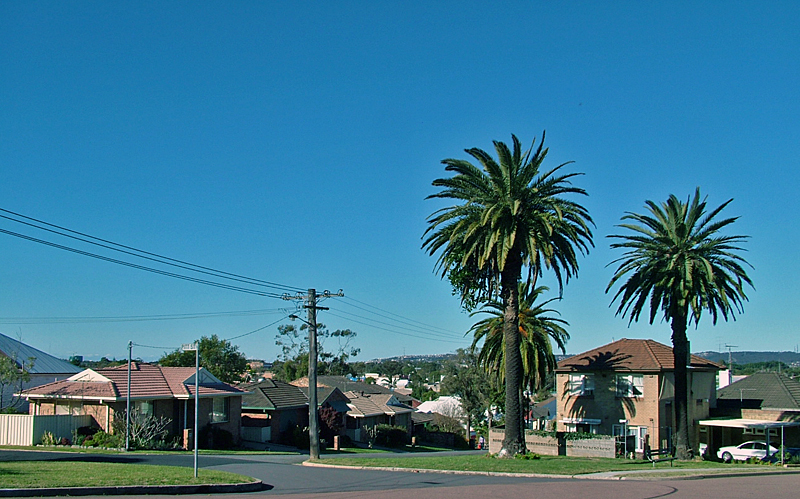
A view south towards Merewether Heights, overlooking residential housing

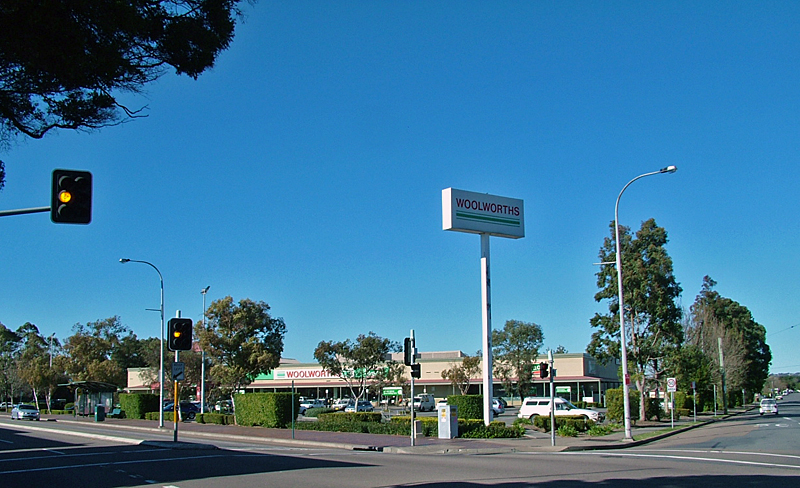
Woolworths Supermarket, Mayfield

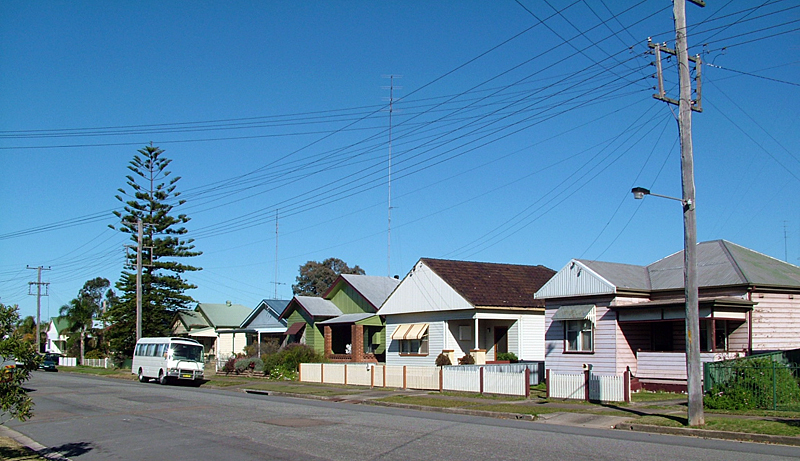
Texas Street, a residential street in Mayfield

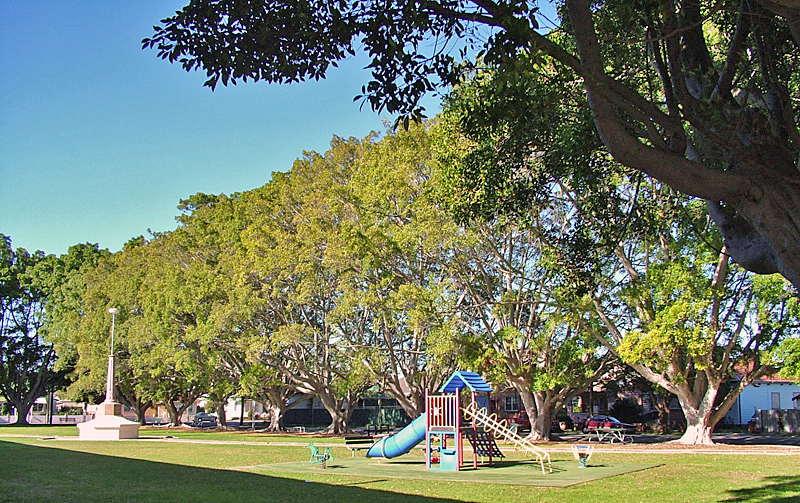
Webb Park is located on the corner of Waratah and Hanbury Streets

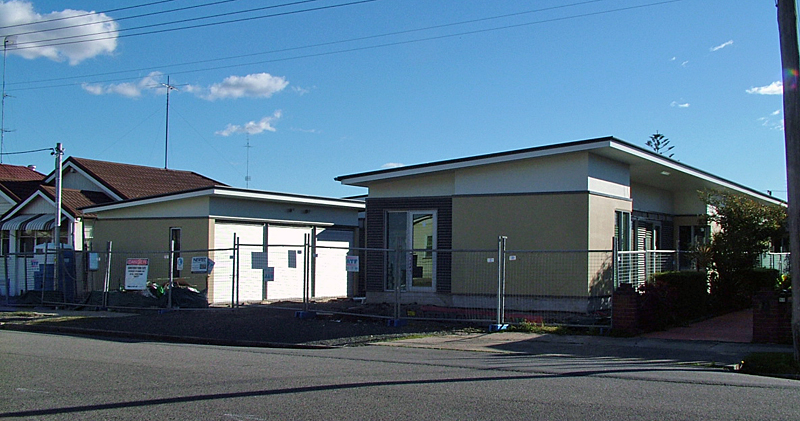
This set of townhouses was built as retirement homes for the local convent. They were designed by Duc Associates.

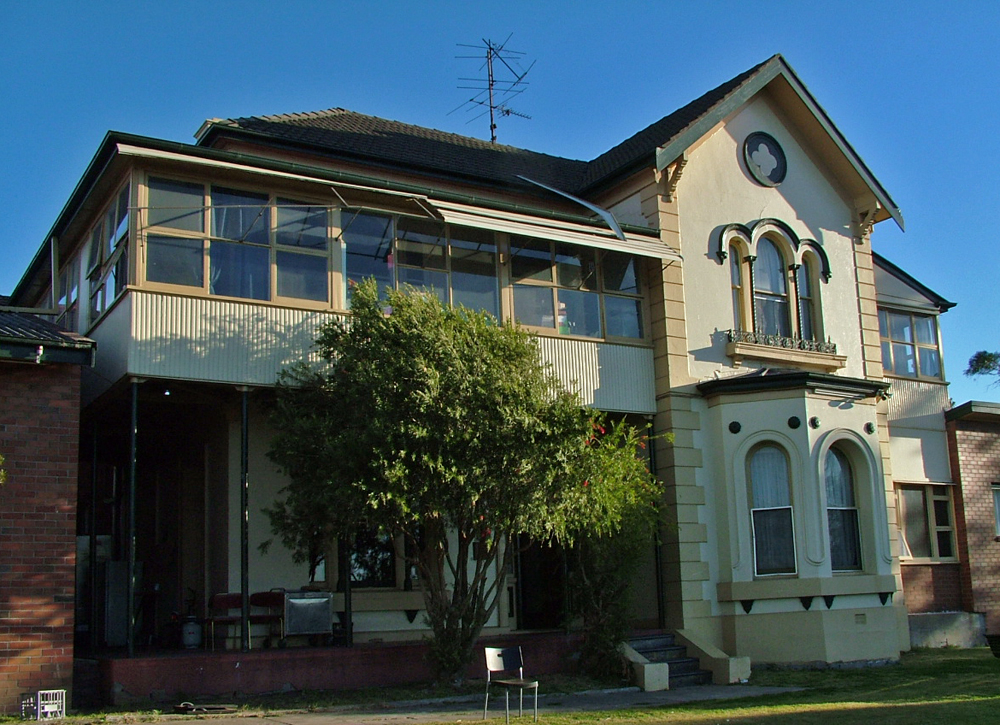
Mayfield House, originally the property of the late Mr John Scholey.

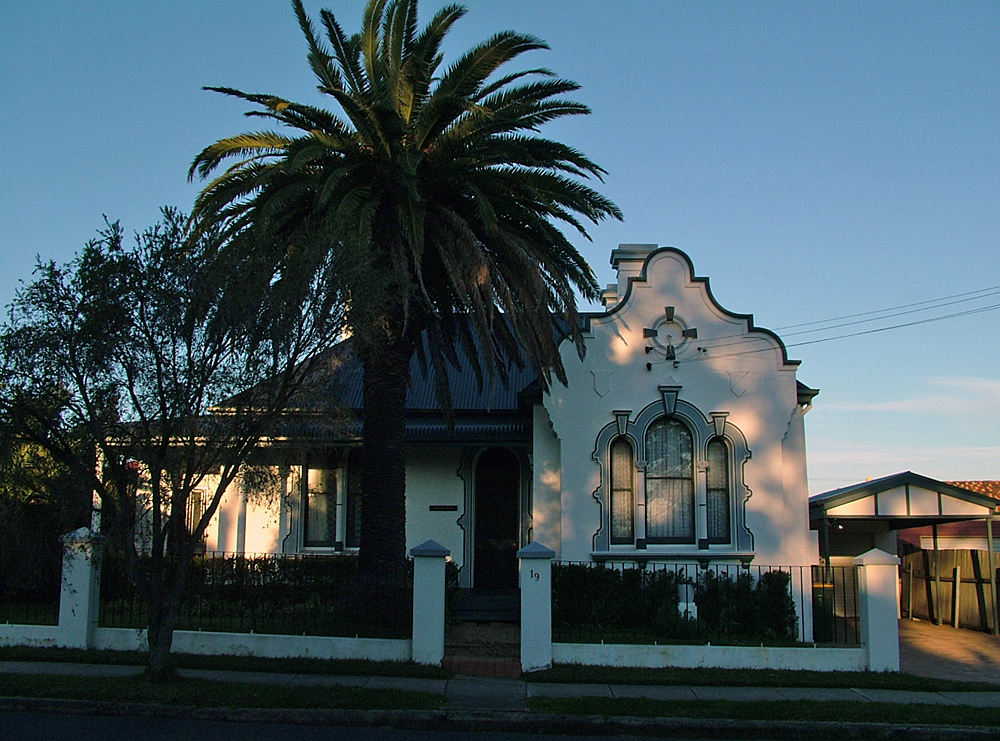
Barton Hall, located on Barton Street.

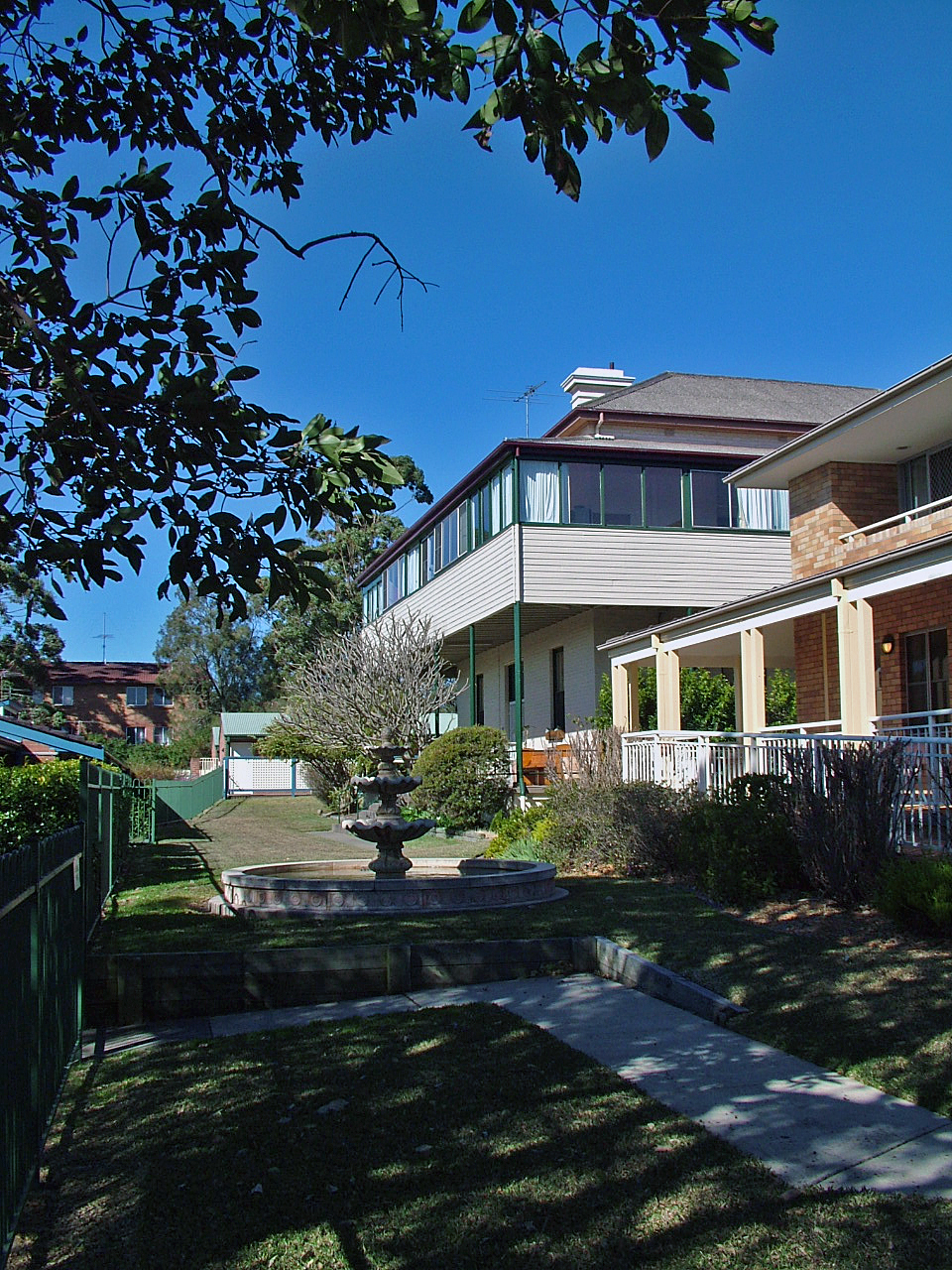
Arnott Holme, originally owned by Charles Upfold, then William Arnott, then Isaac Winn

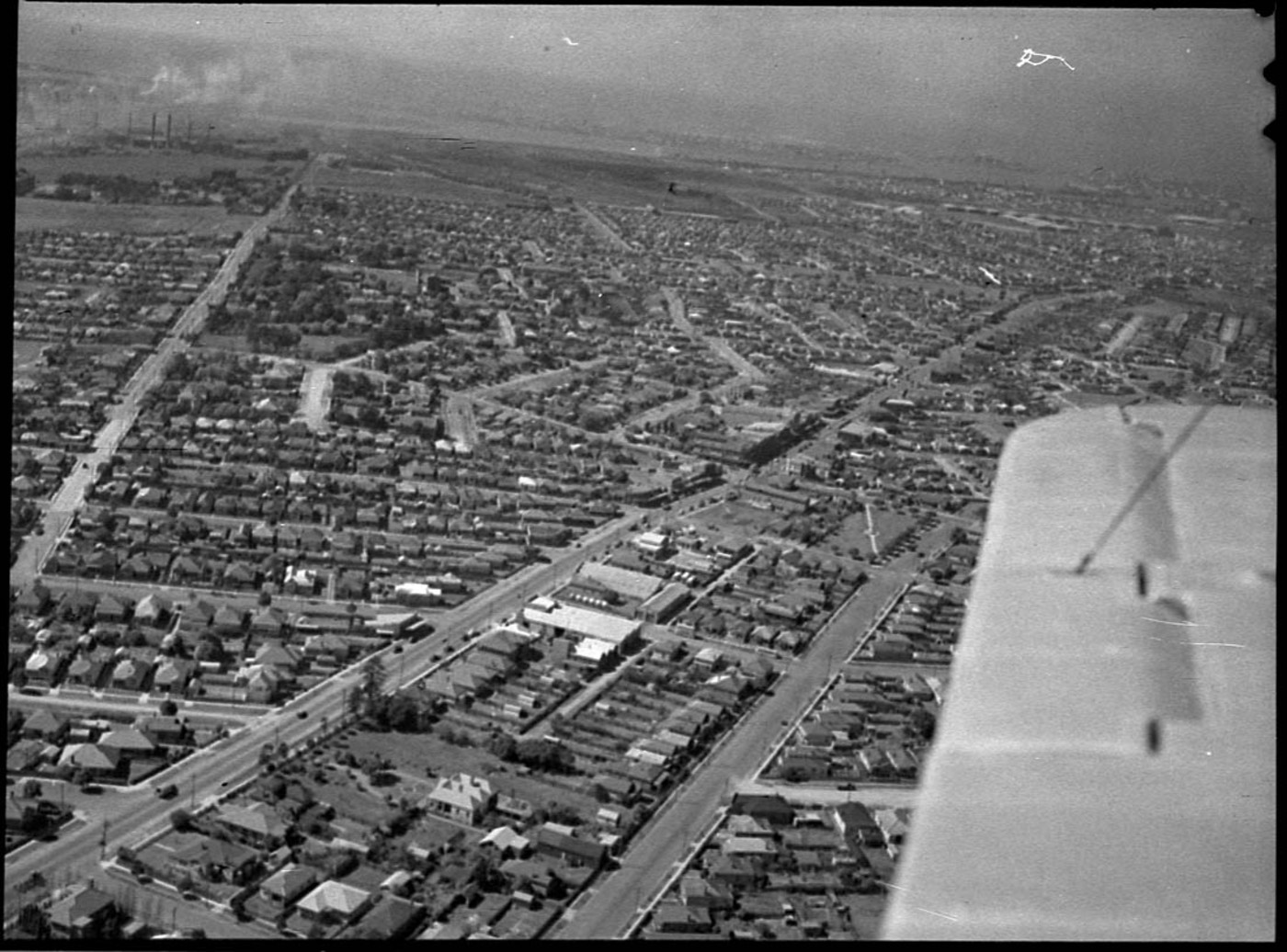
Aerial photograph of Mayfield in 1950
