= Carrington Pump House =

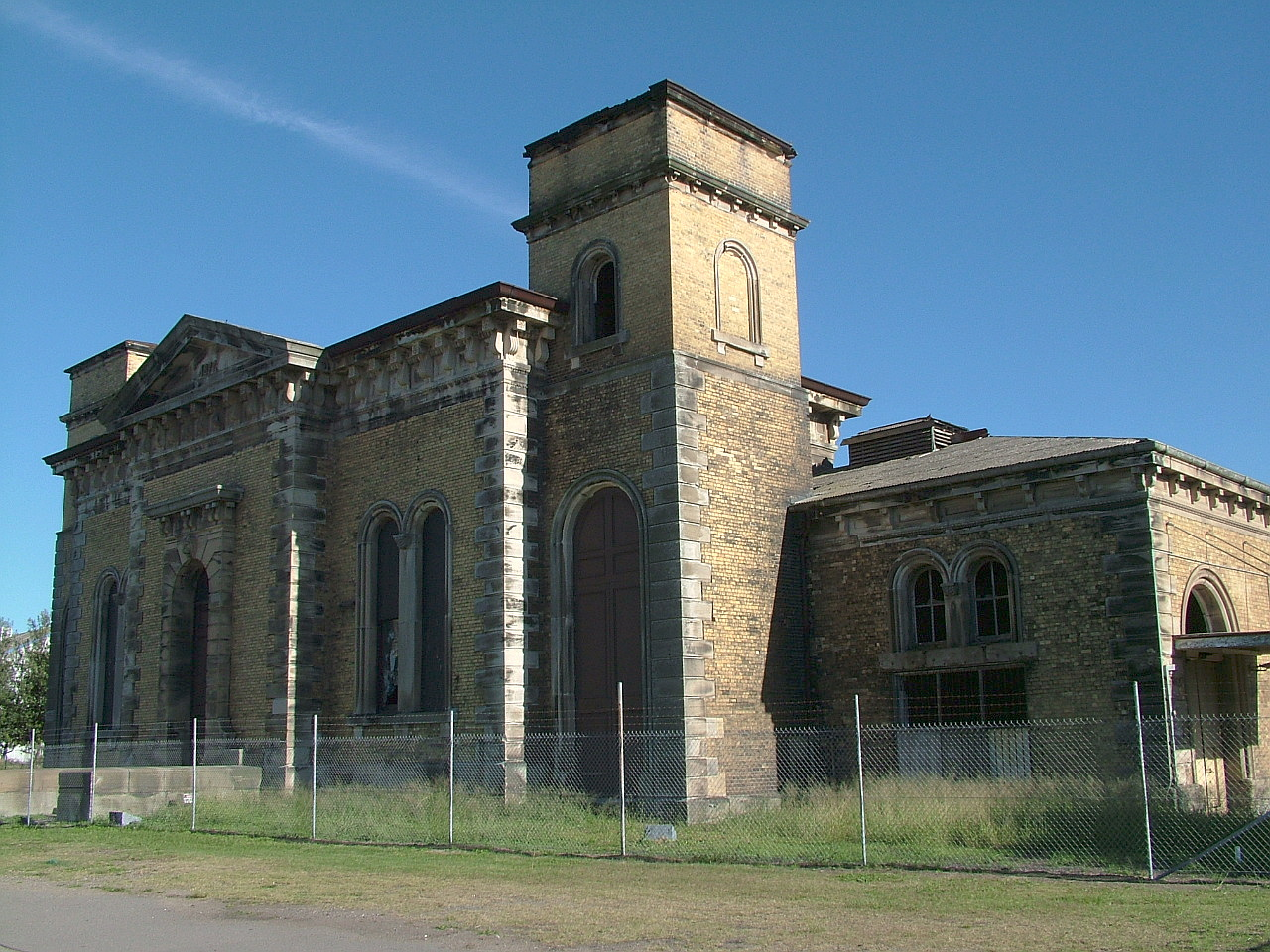

- Location within New South Wales Location within Australia
- 32.9149°S 151.7691°E
- Location: 106 Bourke Street, Carrington, New South Wales, Australia

History
- Built: 1877–1878

New South Wales Heritage Register
- Official name: Hydraulic Engine House and Crane Bases Nos. 7, 8, 9 and 10; Carrington Hydraulic Power Station; Carrington Pumphouse
- Type: state heritage (built)
- Designated: 25 August 2017
- Reference no.: 1987
- Type: Harbour
- Category: Transport - Water
- Builders: William H. Jennings

Carrington Pump House is a heritage-listed former hydraulic power station at 106 Bourke Street, Carrington, New South Wales, Australia. It was built from 1877 to 1878 by William H. Jennings. It is also known as Hydraulic Engine House and Crane Bases Nos. 7, 8, 9 and 10 and Carrington Hydraulic Power Station.

== History ==
The Awabakal people are the traditional custodians of the site of Newcastle. Their name for what is now Carrington (formerly Bullock Island) was Onebygamba (Onibygambah). Thickly vegetated and low-lying, the island faced the estuary of what the Europeans were to name Throsby's Creek after the first commandant of the Newcastle penal settlement. At high tide much of the island was covered by water. The Awabakal fished, hunted and gathered nearby.

Europeans began to settle the island in the 1860s, calling it Onebygamba; Chapman's Island; Bullock Island; and later Carrington. These early settlers little expected that the place would later have great strategic value to the NSW coal industry. Although in 1831 the colonial government had withdrawn from coal loading at Port Hunter, the port of Newcastle, it re-entered the field in the mid-1860s following complaints that the largest mining companies were monopolising the waterfront. Although steam cranes and coal loading staiths were provided, these proved problematic, and the mining companies began to press for better facilities capable of cheaper operation and easy expansion. Edward Orpen Moriarty, Engineer-in-Chief of the Harbours and River Navigation Branch of the Department of Public Works (PWD), had previously decided that public sector coal handling facilities should be centralised at Bullock Island. This plan, informed by the advice of long-standing residents of Newcastle, was part of Moriarty's highly ambitious scheme, evolved in 1858, for the transformation of Port Hunter from a swampy estuary to a deep water harbour.

A long stone and rubble wall, composed of stone and rubble ballast discharged from visiting ships, was accordingly formed along a mudbank on the eastern side of the island. Along this wall, initially called the Ballast Dyke and later simply "The Dyke", ground was reclaimed and a wharf was built. By 1874 Moriarty and his associate Cecil West Darley, the local PWD Resident Engineer, had decided that the best way to load coal was with hydraulic cranes erected on masonry bases and powered from a central engine house. The Engine House and hydraulic crane bases were erected by William H. Jennings, who also fitted out the Engine House. Plant and cranes were supplied by Armstrong Whitworth of Elswick. A hydraulic engineer, acting under Moriarty, came out from the UK to supervise their erection, for which Armstrong had specified the layout.

The visually striking yellow semi-plastic face bricks of the Engine House were supplied by Joseph Bowtell of Glebe, who also supplied the red face bricks of the four crane bases; the sandstone, in blocks varying from ton to 9 tons, was transported by sea from Pyrmont. Cofferdams were used for the laying of the 10 feet 6-inches deep mass concrete building foundations, and were also used for the footings of the accumulators. The accumulator towers each contained an Armstrong hydraulic accumulator, a large cast iron cylinder within which a 120-ton ram filled with ironworks slag bore down on cylindrical water reservoirs to provide pressurised water. The feed water was supplied via a gravity pipeline from the nearby suburb of Wickham, collected in tanks within the central engine room, and pumped by high-pressure compound steam pumping engines into the accumulators. The engines rested on mass concrete bases surrounded by cast iron floor gratings. Steam was supplied by a boiler house, to which coal was brought along a short railway siding.

The identity of the designer of the Engine House is a mystery. Some have suggested that the building might have been designed in the UK; others consider that it may have been designed by the Colonial Architect's Branch of the PWD under James Barnet, perhaps in association with Edmund Spencer, one of his assistants. There is, however, no direct evidence for these suggestions; and such plans as might have resolved the quandary may have been lost when, in 1882, fire destroyed the Garden Palace, Sydney. The building's materials are certainly similar to those of the Newcastle Customs House, in which Barnet and Spencer collaborated, and which was completed around the same time by the same contractor, and perhaps by the same workmen. Yet the two designs are quite distinct, and a highly detailed Parliamentary return, supplied by Barnet, listing all works undertaken by the Colonial Architect's Branch between 1862 and 1881, does not mention the project, although it was one of the great NSW engineering works of its era. The building may, instead, be the work of E. O. Moriarty, who along with Darley supervised the entire project, and with Darley designed the engine house of the Walka Water Works. If this is so, he may have been assisted by John Whitton, the English-born Engineer-in-Chief of the New South Wales Government Railways (NSWGR), for there are some notable similarities between elements of the Engine House and Whitton's second Sydney (1872) and Albury (1881) railway stations, particularly in the frieze and modillion treatments. This does not discount a possible contribution by Barnet, for he, Moriarty and Whitton all worked in the same building under John Rae, the PWD secretary.

At the time of its completion in 1878, the Bullock Island complex, consisting of the first stage of the Engine House, the first four cranes, and the first nests of railway sidings, was an industrial wonder dominating much of the port. A "magnificent structure of solid handsome masonry, being built of white glistening sandstone blocks, beautifully dressed, from Sydney quarries, relieved by yellow brick masonry neatly pointed, and well and truly laid", the Engine House impressed many inter-colonial and overseas visitors and engineers, to whom it rapidly became a tourist attraction. The hydraulic accumulators developed the 800psi water pressure for the cranes' peak hoisting task, although the base load was provided by the pumping engines, originally of 100 horsepower, with 18-inch cylinders generating 90 psi. The pressurised water was directed to the cranes along 10-inch diameter iron pipes. These, running beneath The Dyke wharfs, were joined with bolted junctions. 6-inch diameter pipes reticulated to and from the cranes, while holding vats within the Engine House engine room allowed the water to be used again and again.

Power for each crane was regulated by the opening and closing of cocks by the individual crane operators, each standing on a roofless dais and operating two levers, one for hoisting and one for slewing, without smoke or vibration, and only the noise of the pressurised water flowing through the pipe runs. A contemporary journalist noted that "These beautiful pieces of mechanism represent the last achievements of mechanical science in hydraulic machinery. They could be manipulated by a child." The first four hydraulic cranes were constructed on square brick-faced concrete bases topped with coping stones and resting atop square iron caissons supplied by Davy and Co. of Sydney. This use of square caissons and bases, the rationale for which is unknown, was unusual. These caissons were sunk some 40 feet into the river bed, the resultant spoil being manually removed and replaced by mass concrete, which would remain after the iron had rusted away. Second and third batches of cranes, this time mounted on cylindrical bases, allowed the government to concentrate most coal loading at The Dyke, which from 1881 was lit with gas.

Coal trains were hauled to Bullock Island along a branch line from the Great Northern Railway. Individual wagons were then detached and brought to the cranes by horses. This function was later performed by hydraulic and electric capstans, and later still by motor tractors. The cranes each featured a single chain supporting crossheads from which in turn two or four equal lengths of chain were suspended. "Hookers-on" then secured these chains to lugs atop the detachable timber, iron or steel coal hoppers or iron-braced timber coal boxes, which would then be "heaved" off their underframes and slewed over the ship's holds, into which the load was released through hinged bottom doors via a pin struck open by a sledgehammer-wielding "pin boss". The empty hoppers would then be slewed back over their underframes, onto which they were then lowered and secured after the pinning shut of their doors. The process took rather less than two minutes. The cranes, which revolved through 360 degrees on a heavy central bearing, were simple machines supported by massive iron pedestal and housings, the first four of which were supplied by Mort's Dock & Engineering Company, Balmain. Movement was generated by hydraulic rams actuated by the high pressure water from the pipe runs. The crane jibs had no independent movement, so that each coal hopper was raised and lowered by the chain alone. This led up and over a head sheave at the end of the crane jib, then extended down it to another sheave before running around a four-fall chain block, the end of the chain being fixed to the inner section of the crane.

The construction of the Hydraulic Engine House and cranes, together with the development of The Dyke and the laying of railways to serve the complex, lent to the formerly somnolent Bullock Island an atmosphere of life and energy, stimulating predictions that it would become to Newcastle what the Isle of Dogs, a place of much engineering enterprise, was to London.

In 1891 contractor E. J. King erected a second boiler room on the western side of the central engine room. This housed Babcock & Wilcox boilers for a third steam pumping engine. In 1891 King completed another addition, called the Auxiliary Engine House (later known as the dynamo room), on the northern elevation. This housed ground-level Westinghouse engines and dynamos supplying electricity for electric lighting, which replaced the original gas lights. Between 1903 and 1907, additional Armstrong hydraulic cranes, in many ways similar to the existing cranes but mounted on rails and moveable for short distances using electric motors, were erected on the eastern side of a newly-dredged facility called The Basin. At some stage, the Wickham-based water supply was replaced by town water. Between 1915 and 1917, new wharves on the western side were equipped with six Cowans, Sheldon & Company moveable electric cranes. These were designed by Percy Allan, PWD district engineer, with contributions by Orlando Brain, NSWGR Chief Electrical Engineer. To support these, the Auxiliary Engine House was reconfigured as a condenser (battery) room, and a freestanding substation was erected to the north, apparently as part of a scheme for the complete replacement of the hydraulic cranes. Electricity was supplied by submarine cable from Newcastle's Zaara Street Power Station. The substation later supplied power to the Carrington electric trams also, although some evening passengers had difficulty in reading their newspapers when their saloon lights dimmed as the cranes were drawing power.

From the 1930s, the stationary and moveable hydraulic cranes were progressively decommissioned, with some supplying parts to the moveable cranes. In the 1950s, the decade in which conveyor belt-based loading technology was first introduced, Crane Base No. 9 was demolished to a level below the low water mark. The last coal was loaded by the moveable hydraulic cranes, the pipe runs to which were by then not watertight, in 1967, although two electric cranes, converted for general cargo, survived until 1988. The internal plant of the Engine House was scrapped, although some relics remain in the form of minor electrical fittings, engine bases, pipe sections, wall ladders and floor gratings, while some elements of the hydraulic ram overrun equipment are retained in the accumulator towers. The building, bereft of the purposes for which it was built, fell into dilapidation and assumed a starkness born of isolation. During the 1980s, Crane Bases Nos. 7 and 8 were fitted with heavy-duty bollards for ships' hawsers, while a part-concrete catwalk was constructed over Crane Base No. 10. Crane Base No. 7 was subsequently surrounded by the part-concrete catwalk of the temporary Newcastle cruise terminal. In 2007, all Engine House additions, together with the substation, were demolished pursuant to a Development Application only partly acted upon.

The Hydraulic Engine House and Crane Bases Nos. 7, 8, 9 and 10 are considered to constitute, at both state and national level, the most complete example of a coal loading system predating the introduction of conveyor belt-based loading technology.

== Description ==
The Hydraulic Engine House, Carrington (also called Bullock Island), is a large building in face brick and stone, executed in the Victorian Academic Classical style with some Victorian Romanesque features. Located near Port Hunter, the building is composed of a three-bayed central engine room, balanced by two accumulator towers and flanked by boiler rooms. The main roof, supported by iron trusses, is of Penrhyn slate. The main facade is both monumental and symmetrical. The entry is approached across a peristyle via steps flanked by massive angular stone plinths. A heavily carved stone lion's head stands over the main entry, which is flanked by side bays with elongated arched windows, corbelled sills and prominent voussoirs and mullions, the latter featuring elaborate carvings of bunched roses, thistles and shamrocks, national flowers of three of the nationalities of the United Kingdom. The stone architrave is surmounted by a frieze featuring prominent modillions supporting a cast-iron cornice, above which is a pediment with a simple tympanon. A substantial addition, known as the Auxiliary Engine House or Dynamo Room, stands at rear. Crane Bases Nos. 7, 8, 9 and 10 are square-shaped structures in mass concrete faced in red brick and capped with coping stones.

=== Condition ===
As at 16 August 2016, the Engine House brickwork has fretted in places; lime mortar is depleted in some areas; while rising damp has degraded areas of both stonework and brickwork. Some relics remain in the form of sections of hydraulic pipes and pipe junctions; engine foundations and floor grating; hydraulic accumulator pulleys; wall ladders and the like; and sections of steel interior electrical lighting conduit. Most of the interior wall area is limewashed. Much of the external cast iron cornice remains in fair condition, although it is depleted in parts. Some timberwork and window glazing requires attention. The slate roof is damaged in some places. The condition of Crane Bases Nos. 7, 8 and 10 varies between good and poor. Lime mortar has generally been depleted by weathering; and some bases have been slightly damaged during conversion to shipping dolphins. Coping stones, many of which have been covered in concrete screed, are in places displaced or depleted. Crane Base No. 9 is submerged.

The Hydraulic Engine House maintains its 1877-1891 elements, with the exception of the now-demolished chimneys that formerly flanked the boiler houses. Crane Bases Nos. 7, 8 and 10 are intact; Crane Base No. 9 is submerged at low water.

=== Modifications and dates ===
- 1877-1878: the first stage of the Hydraulic Engine House, consisting of an engine room with two pumping engines, two accumulator towers and one (western) boiler room with a prominent brick chimney stack, is completed. Crane Bases Nos. 7, 8, 9 and 10, linked by a timber-built wharf established on filled ground known as The Dyke, are constructed; Armstrong hydraulic cranes are mounted.
- 1878-1880s: additional hydraulic cranes are erected.
- 1881: the Engine House and cranes are lit with gas.
- 1890-1891: the second stage of the Engine House, including an eastern boiler room with a chimney considerably higher than the first, is constructed; a third pumping engine is installed.
- 1891: a rear addition, the Auxiliary Engine House, is constructed, generating electricity to replace gas lighting.
- 1890s-1930s: small-scale additions, such as a battery room and electrical workshop are made. Sections of masonry are removed to provide improved fuelling arrangements for the boiler rooms; these are later infilled in common brick (western boiler house) and steel bars (eastern boiler house).
- 1903-1915: moveable Armstrong hydraulic cranes are installed at The Basin (east); third and fourth pumping engines are provided.
- 1915: the first stage of a free-standing electrical substation, to power Cowans, Sheldon & Company electric cranes being introduced at The Basin (west), is constructed.
- 1930s: Engine House boilers and some steam pumping engines are replaced with electric plant.
- Post-1945: a new electric pumping engine is provided.
- 1930s-1967: the stationary and moveable hydraulic cranes are progressively decommissioned and scrapped as required; the slate Engine House roof is replaced with asbestos sheeting. Crane Base No. 9 is demolished to below low water. At some stage a large aperture is opened in the wall between the Engine House engine room and the Auxiliary Engine House, replacing one of the northern windows with a steel joist.
- 1960s: the Engine House plant is removed to create storage space for the Maritime Services Board Supply Branch. Both chimneys are demolished; the arched boiler room flue apertures are infilled. Windows are let into the eastern wall of the eastern boiler room, where a cantilever awning is provided above the entry.
- 1960s-1970s: the Dyke wharf is progressively demolished.
- 1970s-1980s: Crane Base Nos. 7 and 8 are fitted with heavy-duty steel tying-up bollards; a concrete catwalk is built over Crane Base No. 10.
- 1995: the roof is recovered in Penrhyn slate. Windows, doors and some ceiling timbers, originally of red cedar, were conserved or reconstructed in Douglas Fir. The timber roof monitors are conserved and reconstructed; the ceiling of the Auxiliary Engine House is later replaced in plywood after a fire.
- 1990s: Crane Base No. 7 is surrounded by a concrete catwalk for the Newcastle cruise terminal.
- 2009: the substation is demolished, together with all Hydraulic Engine House additions apart from the Auxiliary Engine House.

== Heritage listing ==
The Hydraulic Engine House and Crane Bases Nos. 7, 8, 9 and 10, Carrington, are of state heritage significance for their strong association with the port-related application of hydraulic and electrical power in NSW. As relics of an industrial wonder of their age, the Hydraulic Engine House and Crane Bases Nos. 7, 8, 9 and 10 form part of a group collectively illustrating the early application and progress of technologies historically important in the economic development of NSW. They are specially associated with the development of coal handling in Port Hunter, the largest coal port in the Southern Hemisphere and one of great importance in the development of the NSW coal industry. The Hydraulic Engine House and Crane Bases Nos. 7, 8, 9 and 10 are the only examples of their type in NSW, and at both state and national levels constitute the most complete example of a coal loading system predating the introduction of conveyor belt-based loading technology.

The Hydraulic Engine House and Crane Bases Nos. 7, 8, 9 and 10 are of state heritage significance for their association with Armstrong Whitworth and Cowans, Sheldon & Company, engineering companies of world importance; with NSW government engineers Edward Orpen Moriarty; Cecil Darley; John Whitton; Percy Allan and Orlando Brain, and potentially with NSW government architect James Barnet and Edmund Spencer, one of his assistants; and with the public and private sector workers who constructed, operated and maintained the Bullock Island coal handling complex. Although some of the fabric has been depleted or removed over time, both the Hydraulic Engine House and Crane Bases Nos. 7, 8, 9 and 10 are of state heritage significance for their design, materials and setting. They may also be of state heritage significance as constituting landmarks of the public sector-driven transformation of Port Hunter from a swampy estuary to a deep water harbour of national importance. The Hydraulic Engine House and Crane Bases Nos. 7, 8, 9 and 10 are of state heritage significance in yielding scientific and archaeological information as to the nineteenth century transfer of hydraulic technology from the UK to NSW.

Hydraulic Engine House and Crane Bases was listed on the New South Wales State Heritage Register on 25 August 2017 having satisfied the following criteria.

The place is important in demonstrating the course, or pattern, of cultural or natural history in New South Wales.

The Hydraulic Engine House and Crane Bases Nos. 7, 8, 9 and 10 are of state heritage significance for their historical values. As relics of an industrial wonder of their age, they demonstrate ninety years of the development of port infrastructure in support of coal exports, one of the trades upon which the economic development of NSW depends. The first of their kind in Australia, they demonstrate the significance of the port of Newcastle to the colonial economy. They are intimately associated with the nineteenth century Public Works Department scheme for the transformation of Port Hunter from a swampy estuary into the largest coal port of the Southern Hemisphere, and a mainstay of the NSW coal mining industry. While the Engine House has been altered through the removal of plant, and three of the crane bases have been reused, they otherwise remain sufficiently intact to be fully legible to diverse audiences. The crane bases are associated with the original order for four hydraulic cranes, and are readily distinguished by their square shape.

The place has a strong or special association with a person, or group of persons, of importance of cultural or natural history of New South Wales's history.

The Hydraulic Engine House and Crane Bases Nos. 7, 8, 9 and 10 are of state heritage significance in providing evidence as to the progress of the architectural and engineering professions in NSW between the 1870s and the 1960s. In demonstrating the introduction into NSW of hydraulic coal loading technology they are strongly associated with engineers Edward Orpen Moriarty and Cecil Darley, and the Harbours and Rivers Branch of the Department of Public Works; with engineer John Whitton of the NSWGR; with Harbours and Rivers engineer Percy Allan and NSWGR Chief Electrical Engineer Orlando Brain; potentially with James Barnet and Edmund Spencer of the Colonial Architect's Branch of the PWD; and especially with Armstrong Whitworth (Engine House and Crane Bases) and Cowans, Sheldon & Company (Auxiliary Engine House/dynamo room), engineering companies of world importance. They also have a special association with the public and private sector workers who constructed, operated and maintained the Bullock Island coal handling complex.

The place is important in demonstrating aesthetic characteristics and/or a high degree of creative or technical achievement in New South Wales.

The Hydraulic Engine House and Crane Bases Nos. 7, 8, 9 and 10 are of state heritage significance for their aesthetic and technical values. They are associated with high levels of creative and technical achievement, both in their ability to house the state-of-the art machinery and equipment necessary for the development and transmission of hydraulic (and later electric) power and in their built form. Although the Engine House now lacks its chimneys it remains aesthetically distinctive, particularly with regard to its architectural elements, size and materials. It exemplifies an industrial application of the Victorian Academic Free Classical style of architecture with some Victorian Romanesque features. Situated near the apex of The Basin and visible across a wide area, the Engine House is a landmark of the second-largest city in NSW. Despite their re-use for other port-related purposes, Crane Bases Nos. 7, 8, 9 and 10 remain aesthetically and technically distinctive in a NSW context, and with one exception are also highly visible.

The place has potential to yield information that will contribute to an understanding of the cultural or natural history of New South Wales.

The Hydraulic Engine House and Crane Bases Nos. 7, 8, 9 and 10 are of state heritage significance for their potential to yield further scientific and archaeological information as to Armstrong hydraulic plant in a maritime setting. Information concerning the siting and operation of engines, chimneys and boilers is provided by footings, sub-floor voids, underground pipe runs and the like. The design and fabric of the building includes substantial load-bearing masonry and long-span metal trusses, and illustrates design techniques for the housing of nineteenth century hydraulic machinery and engines. The Engine House is of state heritage significance, also, in its size and setting, and in the esteem in which it is held by contemporary NSW engineers. The design and fabric of Crane Bases Nos. 7, 8, 9 and 10 demonstrate the nature and application of nineteenth century hydraulic crane technology, and are of state heritage significance because of their unusual square shape. Both the Engine House and Crane Bases Nos. 7, 8, 9 and 10, which along with the railway complex and The Dyke demonstrate the nineteenth century transformation of Port Hunter by the public sector, and constitute benchmarks for understanding the generation and application of hydraulic power in colonial NSW.

The place possesses uncommon, rare or endangered aspects of the cultural or natural history of New South Wales.

The Hydraulic Engine House is of state heritage significance as one of only two nineteenth century hydraulic power facilities extant in NSW, and as the only one related to coal handling. As the only example of its type in NSW, it demonstrates defunct processes and techniques of exceptional historical and technical interest. Hydraulic Crane Bases Nos. 7, 8, 9 and 10 are of state heritage significance as the only examples of their type in NSW, and provide rare evidence of nineteenth century coal handling via Armstrong hydraulic cranes. Their square bases, the result of their being supported by similarly-shaped caissons, are unusual. They are intimately associated with the establishment of the Engine House, and demonstrate a defunct process formerly of great importance to the economy and society of NSW. The Hydraulic Engine House and Crane Bases Nos. 7, 8, 9 and 10 constitute at both state and national levels the most complete example of a coal loading system predating the introduction of conveyor belt-based loading technology.

The place is important in demonstrating the principal characteristics of a class of cultural or natural places/environments in New South Wales.

The Hydraulic Engine House and Crane Bases Nos. 7, 8, 9 and 10 are of state heritage significance as fine examples of their type, exemplifying the principal characteristics of hydraulic and electric coal loading technology as developed and applied by Sir W.G. Armstrong and Co. Ltd, and Cowans, Sheldon and Co. Ltd, companies of world importance. As unique examples of their type in a NSW and Australian context, they are representative of diverse applications of the hydraulic system, and are outstanding in their setting and size. Situated near The Dyke and The Basin, they demonstrate the nineteenth century transformation of Port Hunter from a swampy estuary into the largest coal port of the Southern Hemisphere. They are of state heritage significance in representing a significant variation in hydraulic crane technology as applied in NSW, and form part of a group collectively illustrating the early application and progress of hydraulic technology.
