= Tighes Hill, New South Wales =

Tighes Hill
- Suburb
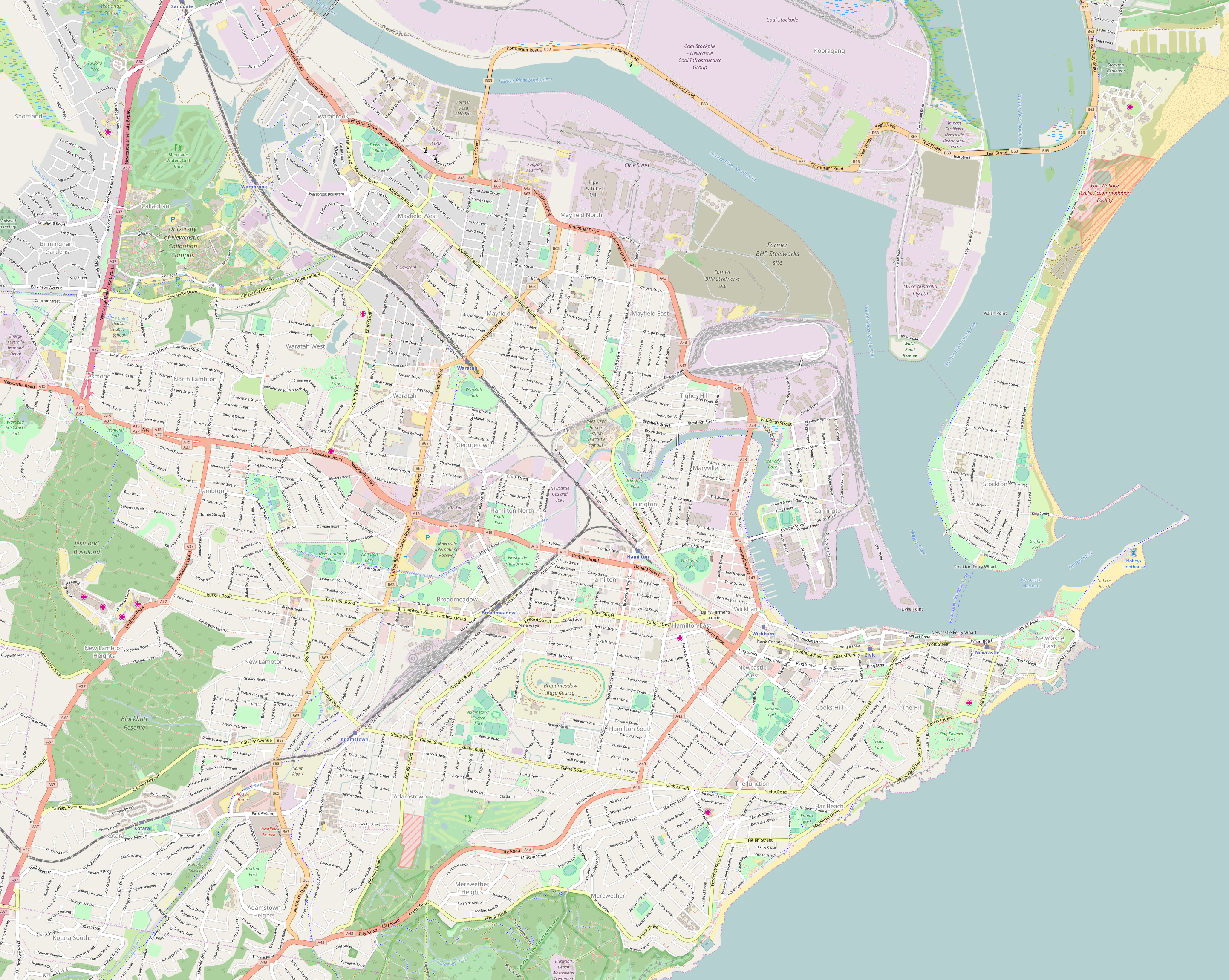
- Interactive map of Tighes Hill
- Coordinates: 32°53′53″S 151°45′04″E
- Country: Australia
- State: New South Wales
- City: Newcastle
- LGA: City of Newcastle
- Location: 5 km (3.1 mi) NW of Newcastle; 31 km (19 mi) SE of Maitland; 164 km (102 mi) NNE of Sydney
- Established: 1870s

Government
  - State electorate: Newcastle
  - Federal division: Newcastle

Area
  - Total: 0.7 km^{2} (0.27 sq mi)
- Elevation: 5 m (16 ft)

Population
  - Total: 1,801 (SAL 2021)
- Postcode: 2297
- Parish: Newcastle
Suburbs around Tighes Hill
Mayfield	Mayfield East	Mayfield North
Mayfield	Tighes Hill	Kooragang
Islington	Maryville	Carrington

Tighe's Hill (/taɪɡz/) is a north-western suburb of Newcastle, New South Wales and was named after A.A.P. Tighe, an early resident, who in 1843 bought the estate. It is primarily a residential area, though it also includes the current Tighes Hill TAFE campus and a commercial area.

== Origins ==
Tighes Hill developed from the construction of a bridge over Throsby Creek at the opening of the Ferndale Colliery in 1877. In 1878 the Tighes Hill Public School was established with a co-ed government primary school located at 33 Elizabeth Street. Within three years the suburb also had a post office, church and stores. In April 1894, a tram line was opened to Tighes Hill which extended to Mayfield in 1901. The tram bridge at the Maitland Rd end of Tighes Terrace is still extant.

== Today ==
Tighes Hill provides housing near the CBD. Tighes Hill has become a trendy inner suburb of the Newcastle inner city area with a large influx of young professionals and families looking for an inner city lifestyle at an affordable price. Property values in Tighes Hill have increased significantly over the past few decades. In August 2010, a property in Tighes Terrace, Tighes Hill, was sold at a record breaking price of $950,000 for this inner city suburb. In February 2020. 5 Sparke Street was sold for $1.5 million which set the highest home price in the history of Tighes Hill so far. In May 2021, realestate.com.au listed Tighes Hill's median property price as $848,000 and a median rent of $465pw. The School of Arts building (on the corner of Elizabeth and Union Sts), which was opened in 1900 and sold by Newcastle Council in 2008 for approximately $420,000, has had a variety of uses supporting arts and the community in Newcastle. The building reopened as The Tighes Hill School of Arts Gallery in January 2009. The Newcastle Campus of Hunter Institute of TAFE, which was also the original campus of the University of Newcastle, forms the western side of Tighes Hill, while its eastern side (along Hannell St) is an emerging commercial precinct located on former industrial land. Tighes Hill has an active local community group (the Tighes Hill Community Group) representing residents, and a much-loved community garden (in George St). In response to approaches by local residents concerned that some developments approved in Tighes Hill in recent years have detrimentally affected the area's local character, Newcastle Council has initiated a local character study of the area.

== Gallery ==
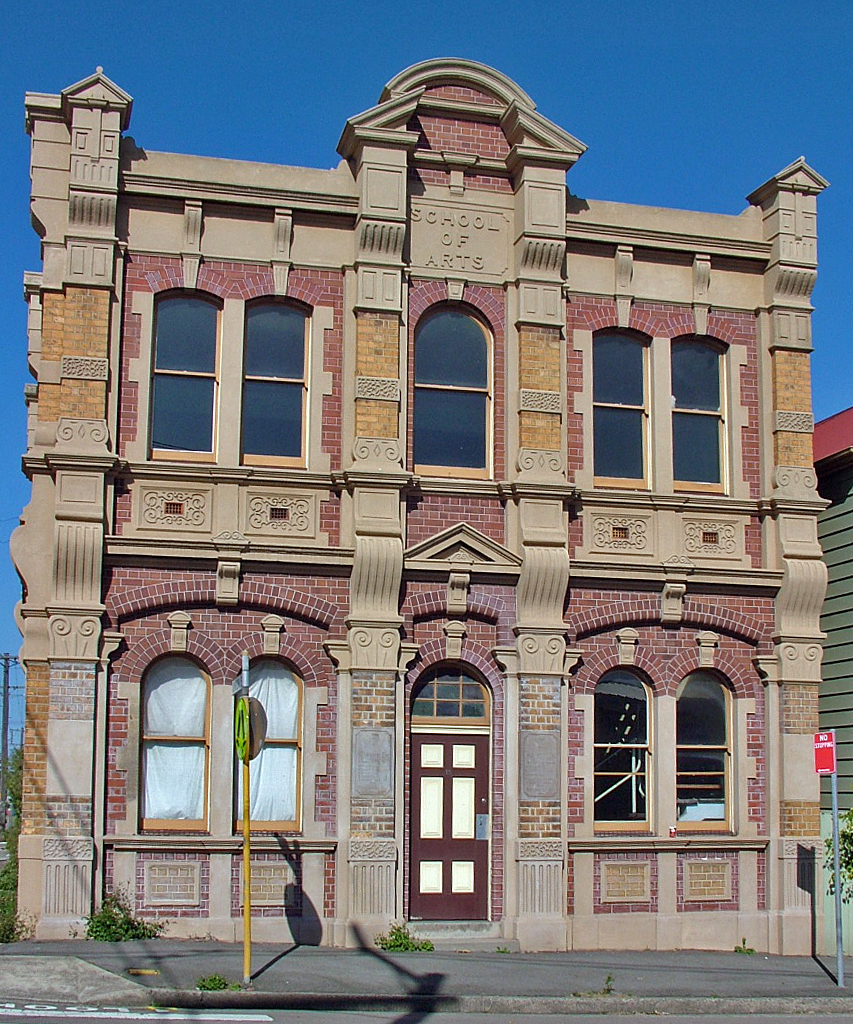
Tighes Hill School of Arts, built in 1900

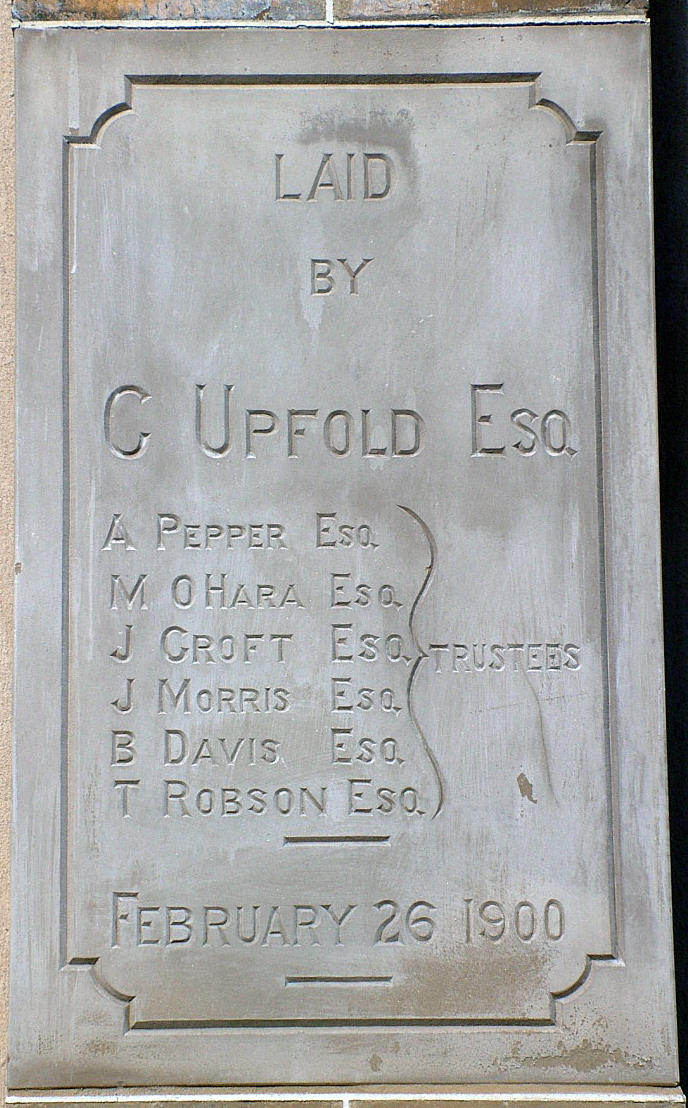
Plaque commemorating the laying of a foundation stone by Charles Upfold in 1900, for the School of Arts building

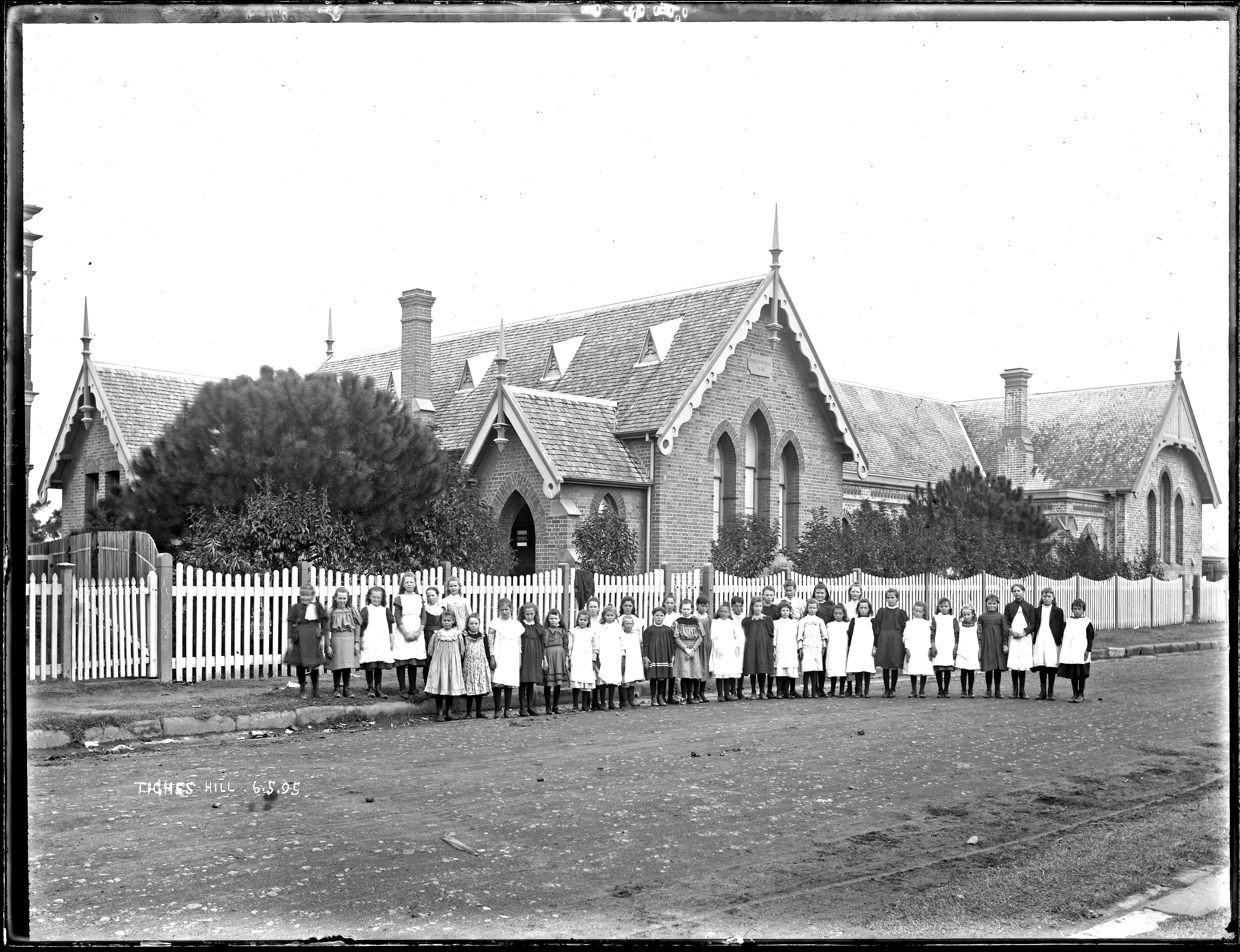
Tighes Hill Public School, Tighes Hill, NSW, 6 May 1895

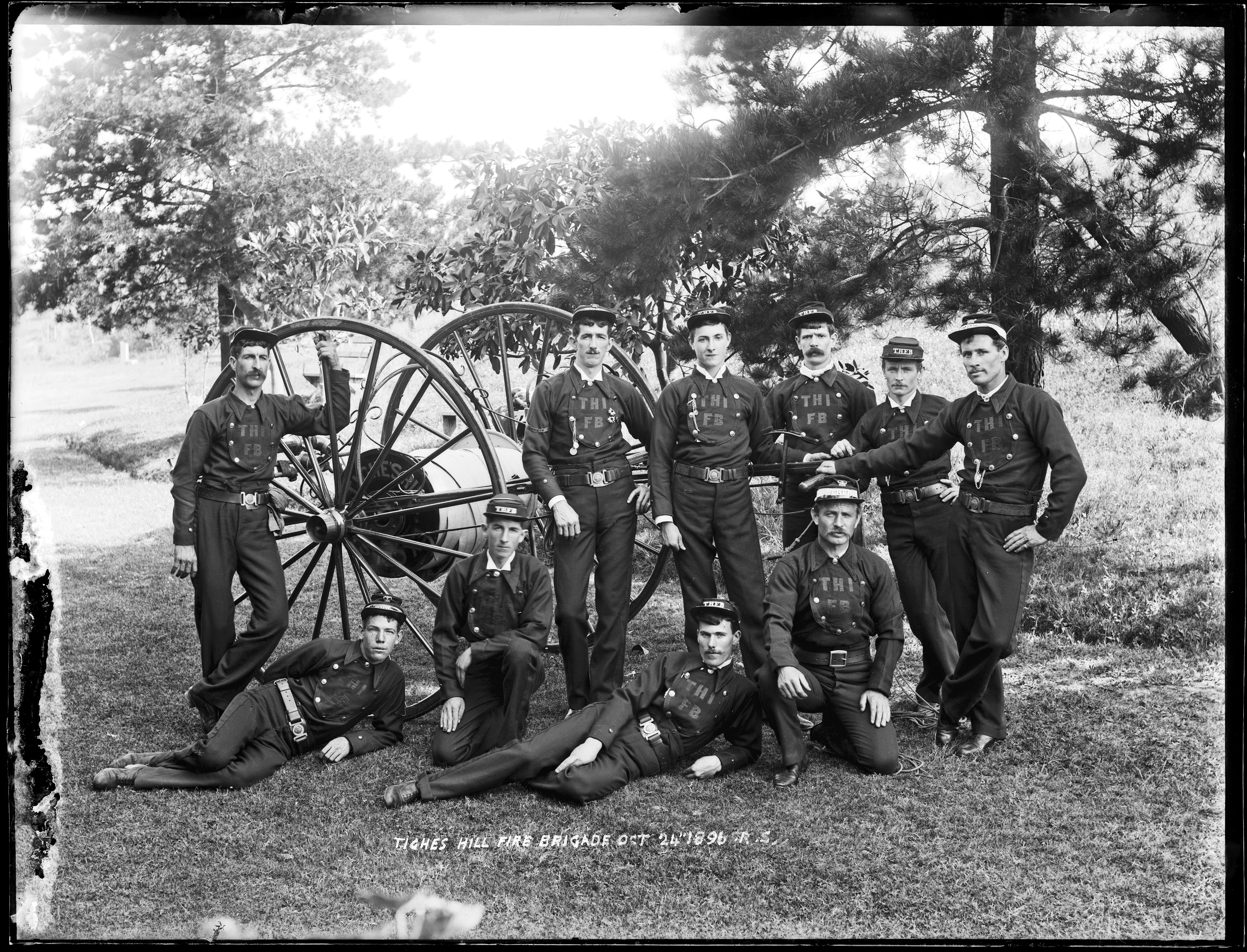
Tighes Hill Fire Brigade, Newcastle, New South Wales, 24 October 1896
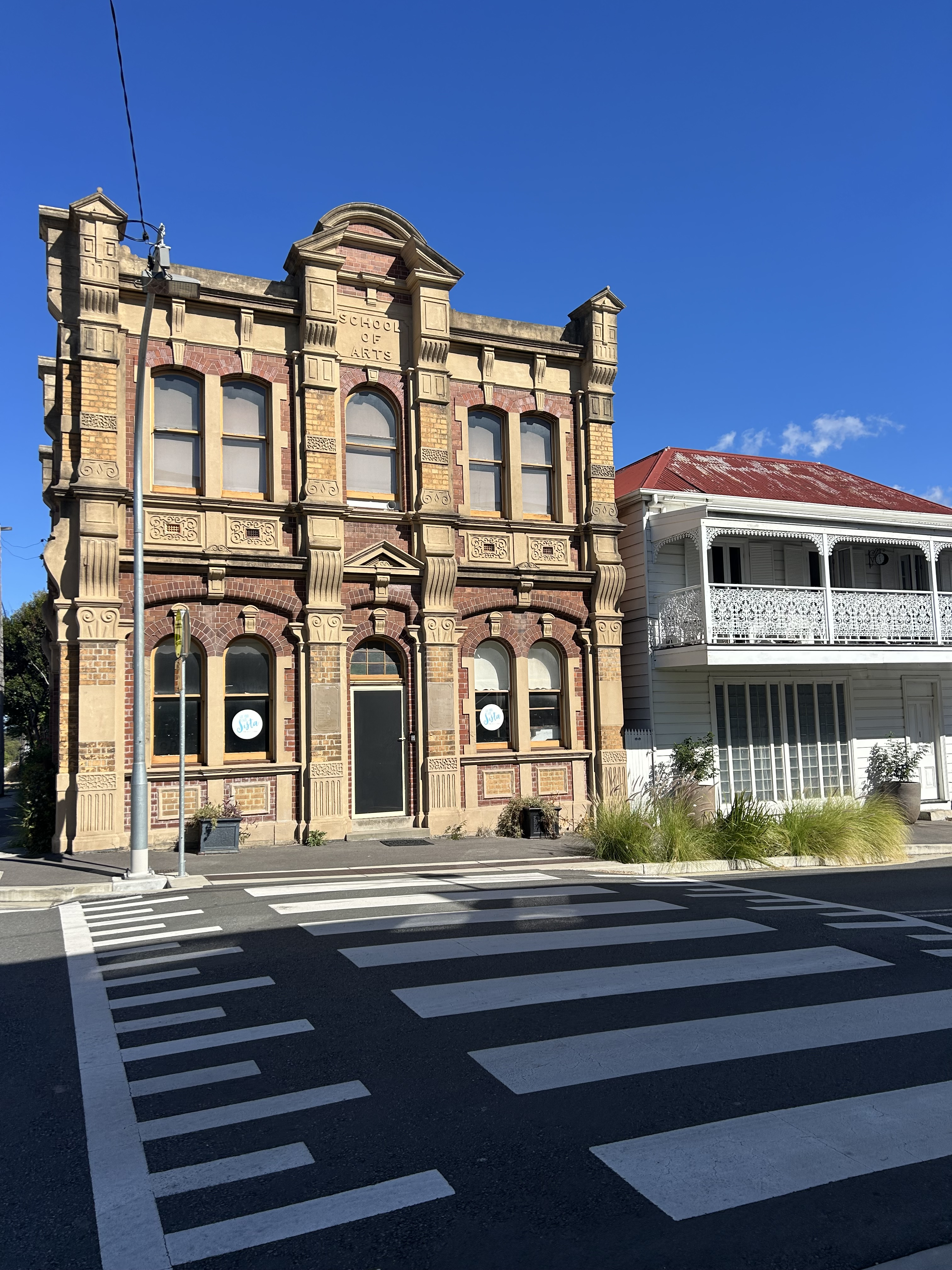
Tighes Hill School of Arts, heritage building c1900
