= Carrington, New South Wales =

Carrington
- Suburb
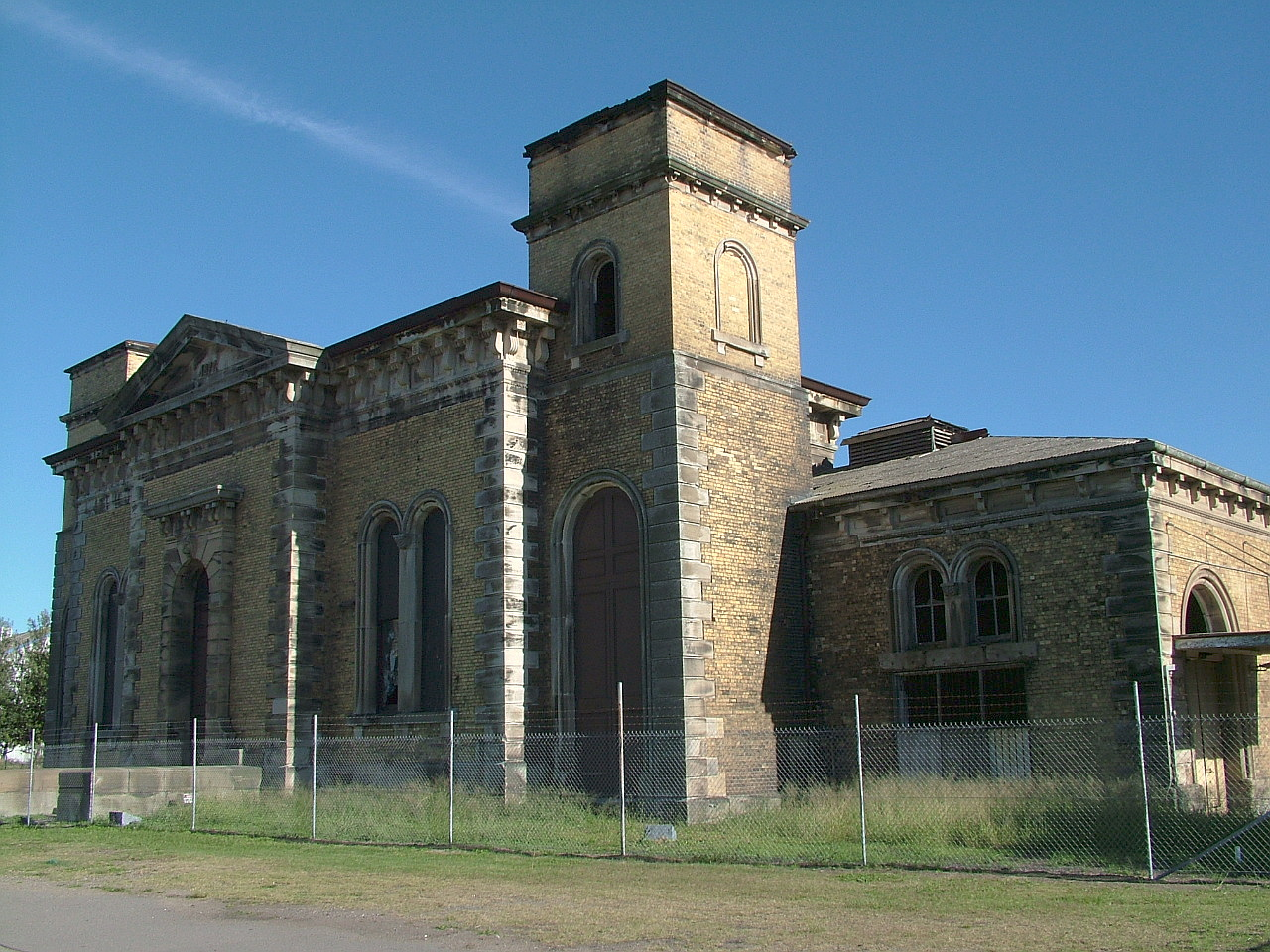
- Carrington Pump House

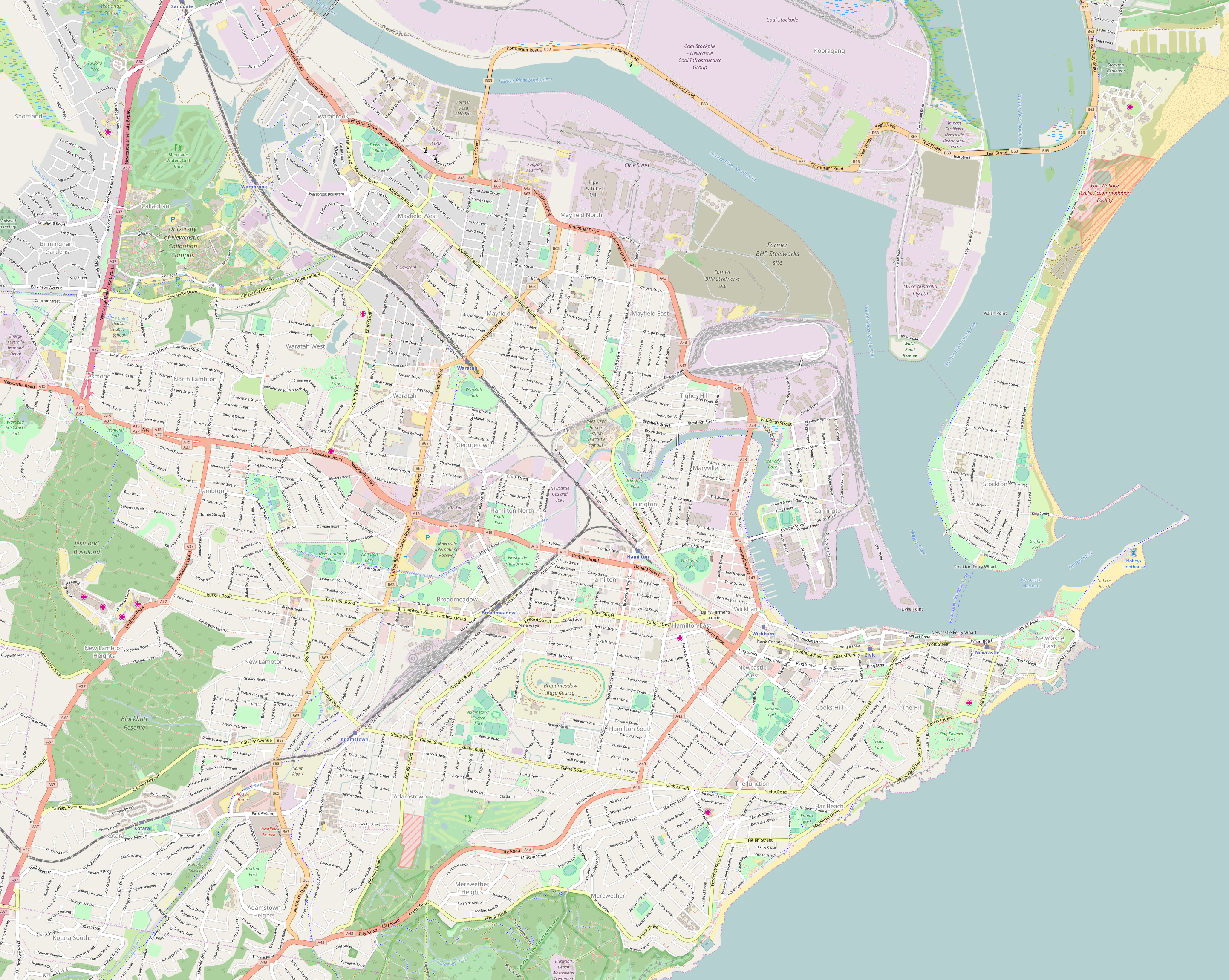
- Interactive map of Carrington
- Coordinates: 32°54′54″S 151°46′05″E
- Country: Australia
- State: New South Wales
- City: Newcastle
- LGA: City of Newcastle
- Location: 3 km (1.9 mi) NNW of Newcastle; 32 km (20 mi) SE of Maitland; 167 km (104 mi) NNE of Sydney
- Established: 1860s

Government
  - State electorate: Newcastle
  - Federal division: Newcastle

Area
  - Total: 1.4 km^{2} (0.54 sq mi)
- Elevation: 4 m (13 ft)

Population
  - Total: 2,061 (SAL 2021)
- Postcode: 2294
- Parish: Newcastle
Suburbs around Carrington
Tighes Hill	Tighes Hill
Maryville	Carrington	Hunter River
Wickham	Newcastle West

Carrington is a suburb of Newcastle, New South Wales, Australia, and is named after Lord Carrington, governor of New South Wales in 1887 when the area was proclaimed a municipality.

Carrington had a population of almost 2,000 in 2016.

== History ==
Carrington was known by Aboriginal people as the place of the mud crab "wuna-r tee". Early land use by Aboriginals was for fishing and gathering oysters and mud crabs. During the settlement of 1804, it was referred to as Chapman's Island and considered as a site for a jail.

Carrington is a testament to the white settlers' need to reshape the environment. Originally, the island was underwater at high tide and was slowly built up by ships dumping ballast and other reclamation work, which eventually saw the island grow out of the mud.

Carrington emerged as a residential suburb in the 1860s when many people moved to the island to escape the dirt and noise of the city or were forced off Honeysuckle Point as a result of land reclamation for port purposes. Early access to the island was by rowboat or punt across Throsby creek or on the Onebygamba express, a two-horse coach. There was also a footbridge from Honeysuckle at one point. Carrington was rich and progressive despite its relatively small size and was one of the few areas of Crown land close to Newcastle, the rest of the land in the area was owned by large companies or private individuals. Carrington was systematically sold off as it became more valuable.

In 1887 Carrington was constituted as a Municipality and the first council meeting was held on 1 June 1888. By 1900, the population was 2200, and Carrington had developed as a working class suburb. In the 1920s, steelworkers moved into the area, taking advantage of the proximity to the fledgling BHP works.

The Carrington Pump House, pictured, supplied power to a series of cranes which operated along 'The Dyke' loading ships with coal and other freight. This is probably the most significant surviving building from Newcastle's nineteenth century industrial past. These cranes were of the latest technology, built by Armstrong Whitworth in Newcastle upon Tyne.

The Great Depression hit Carrington with a vengeance. In 1933 Carrington had up to 58% of wage earners either unemployed or in part-time employ. A shanty town called "Texas" sprung up during the depression and provided shelter for many homeless and unemployed. It got the name Texas due to the fact that land used to be used for stables.

== Street Names ==
Most streets throughout the suburb are named after prominent pre-federation administrators, politicians and monarchs:

=== Queen of Australia ===
The following streets are named after former Queens of Australia:

- Elizabeth St, Elizabeth II (renamed from William St for 1954 Royal Tour of Australia
- Victoria St, Victoria

=== Governor of New South Wales ===
The following streets are named after former Governors of New South Wales:

- Young St, Sir John Young
- Gipps St, Sir George Gipps
- Bourke St, Sir Richard Bourke
- Darling St, Sir Ralph Darling
- Fitzroy St, Sir Charles Augustus FitzRoy
- Denison St, Sir William Denison

=== Chief Justice of New South Wales ===
The following streets are named after former Chief Justices of New South Wales:

- Forbes St, Sir Francis Forbes
- Hargrave St, Sir John Hargrave (Supreme Court Judge only)

=== Premier of New South Wales ===
The following streets are named after former Premiers of New South Wales:

- Cowper St, Sir Charles Cowper
- Parker St, Sir Henry Parker
- Robertson St, Sir John Robertson

=== Politicians ===
- Arnold St, William Arnold
- Darvall St, Sir John Darvall
- Garrett St, Thomas Garrett
- Smart St, Thomas Smart
- Wilson St, Bowie Wilson (previously Little Dension St)

=== Carrington Council ===
- Booth St, Edward Booth, Alderman of Carrington Council
- Coe St, H.N. Coe, Last Mayor of Carrington Council
- Doran St, James Doran, Mayor of Carrington Council
- Howden St, John Howden, Early settler & developer
- Marsden St, George Marsden, Mayor of Carrington Council
- Mathieson St, Alexander Mathieson, Mayor of Carrington Council (previously Little Gipps St)
- McCann St, Robert McCann, Mayor of Carrington Council
- Rodgers St, James Stuart Rodgers, Mayor of Carrington Council (previously Little Young St)
- Scott St, David Scott, Mayor of Carrington Council & Member of Parliament for Newcastle (previously Little Bourke St)

== Today ==
Carrington is a mixed residential, commercial and industrial development that is physically separated from other suburbs. It is close to the harbour and central business district, services the Port and as such has expensive housing. It is accessible by Cowper Street bridge over Throsby Creek.

== Population ==
According to the 2016 census of Population, there were 1,929 people in Carrington.

- Aboriginal and Torres Strait Islander people made up 7.2% of the population.
- 85.2% of people were born in Australia and 90.4% of people only spoke English at home.
- The most common responses for religion were No Religion 43.1%, Catholic 18.4% and Anglican 16.3%.

== Heritage listings ==
Carrington has a number of heritage-listed sites, including:

- 106 Bourke Street: Carrington Pump House
- 33 Cowper Street North: The Seven Seas Hotel (1938), designed in the Inter-war Art Deco/Functionalist style by architects Pitt & Merewether for Tooth and Co., replaced 1884 Cross Keys Hotel in same location.
- 1A Hargrave Street: Carrington Council Chambers (1888), Victorian Italianate council chambers in use until amalgamation in 1938, now a community centre.

== Gallery ==
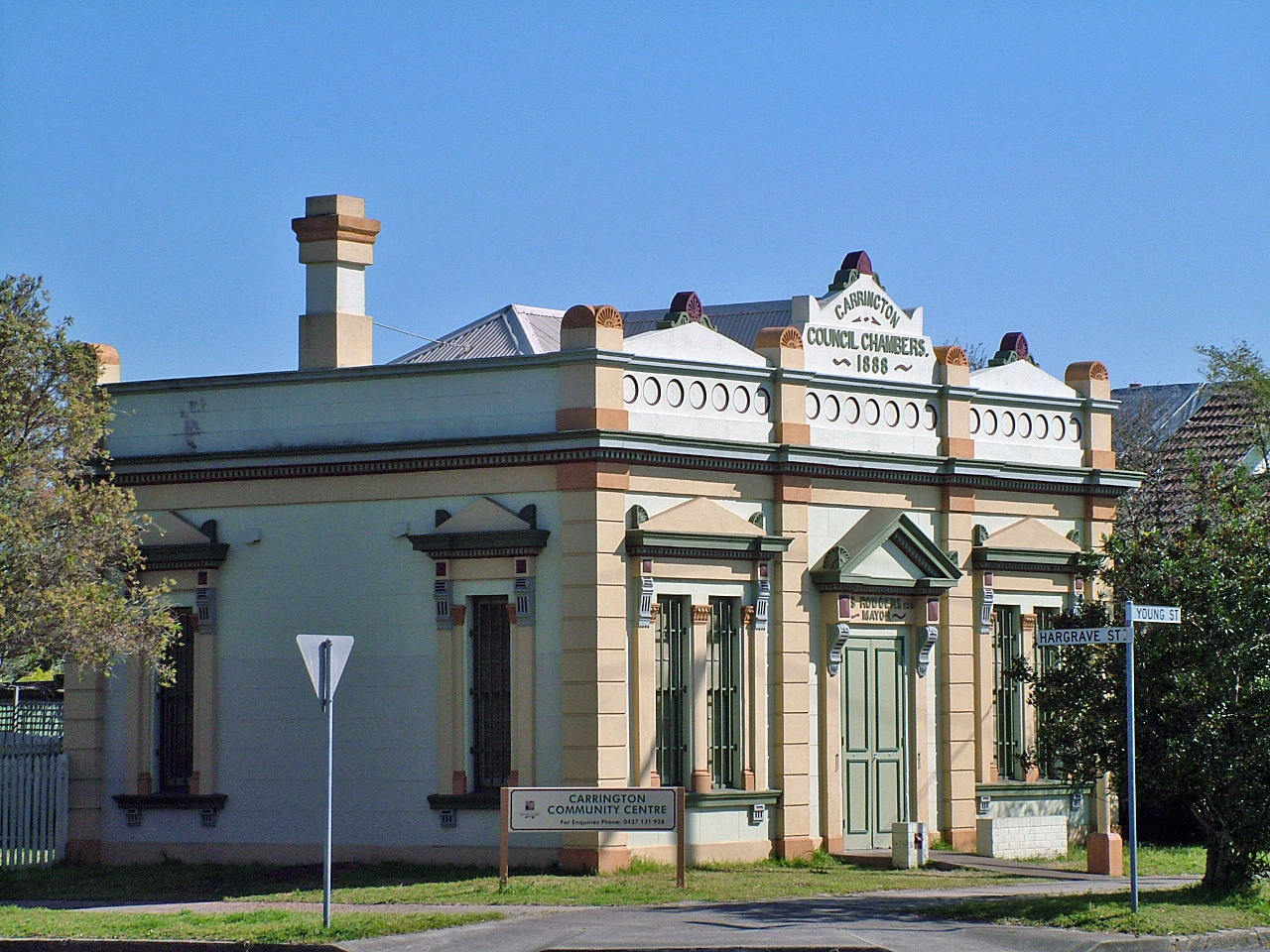
Carrington council chambers, built in 1888 and now in use as a community centre.

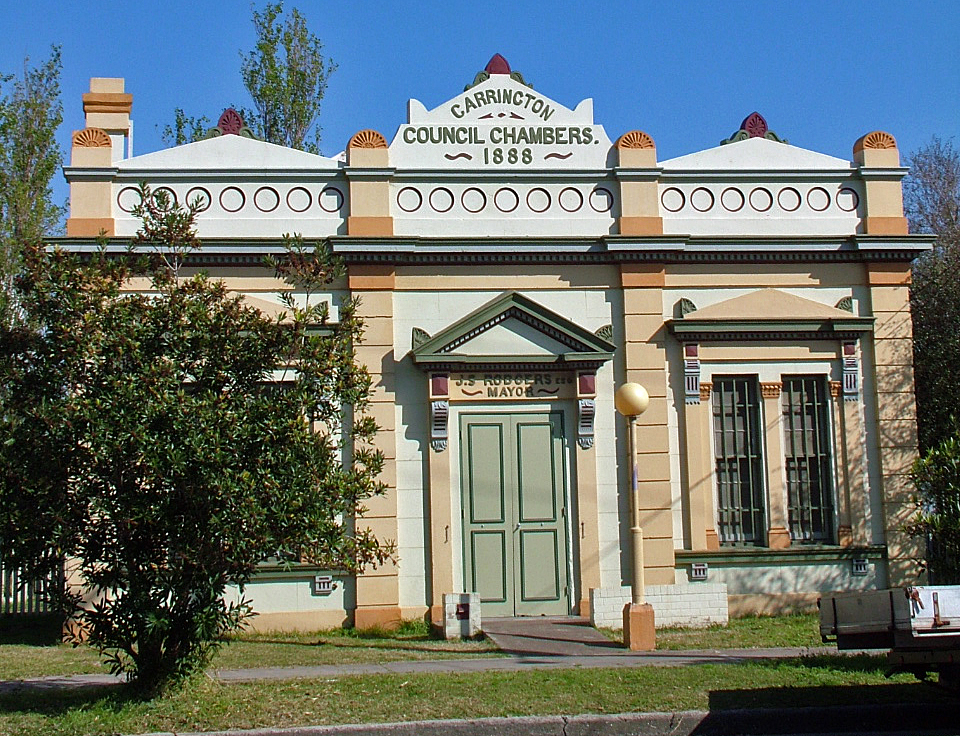
Carrington council chambers, built in 1888

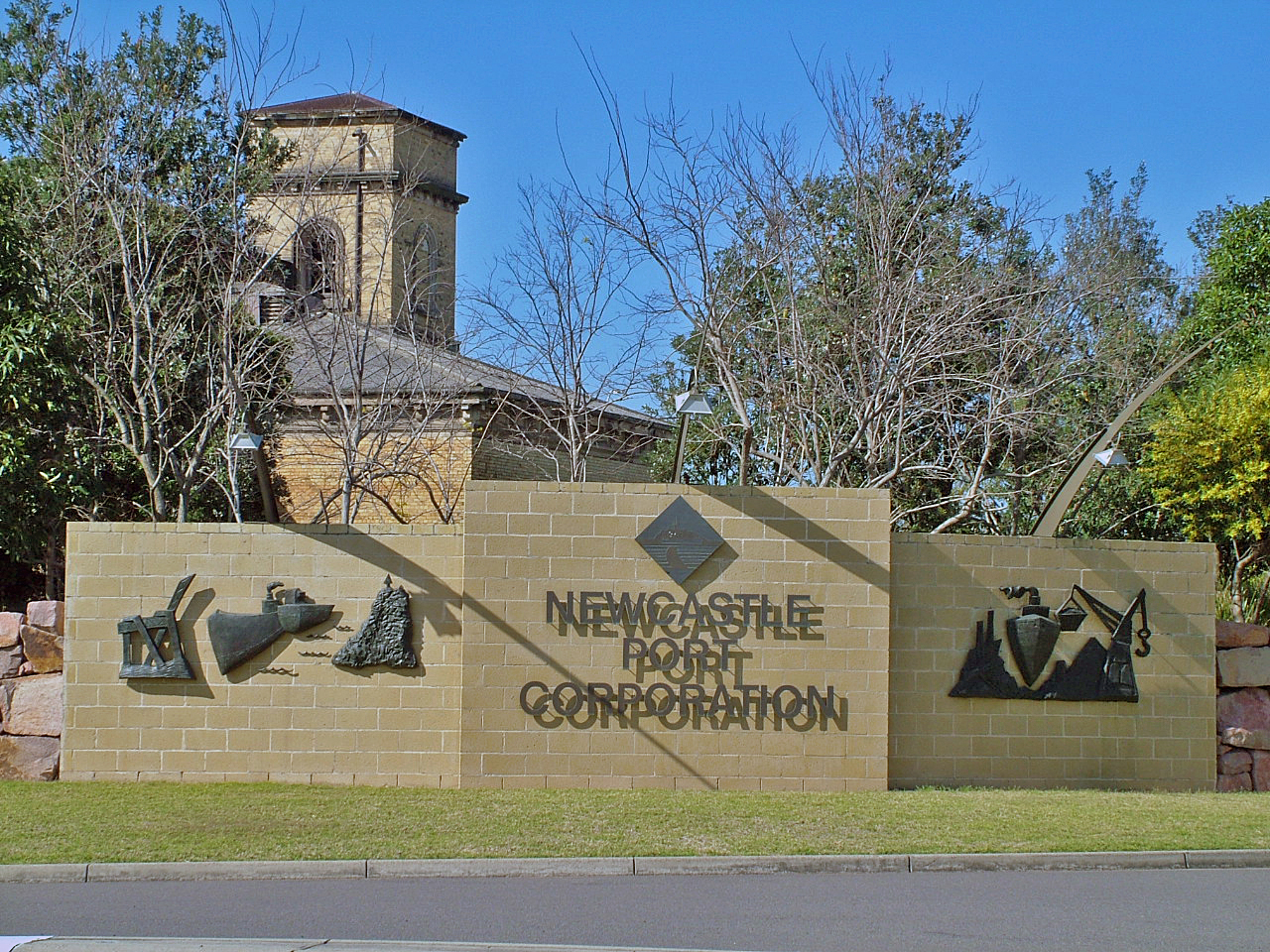
Sign outside the entrance of Newcastle Port Corporation. In the background is the ruins of Carrington Power station

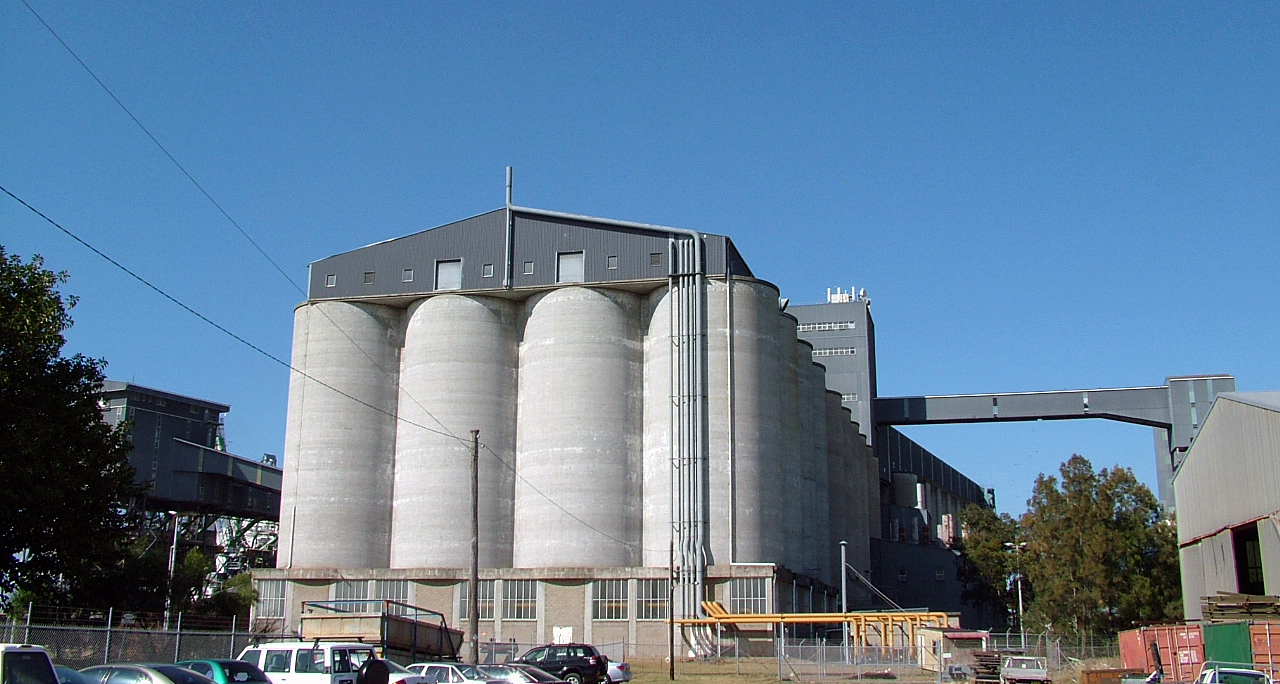
Grain storage silos, Carrington port district, Newcastle, New South Wales.
