= Mayfield North =

- Suburb
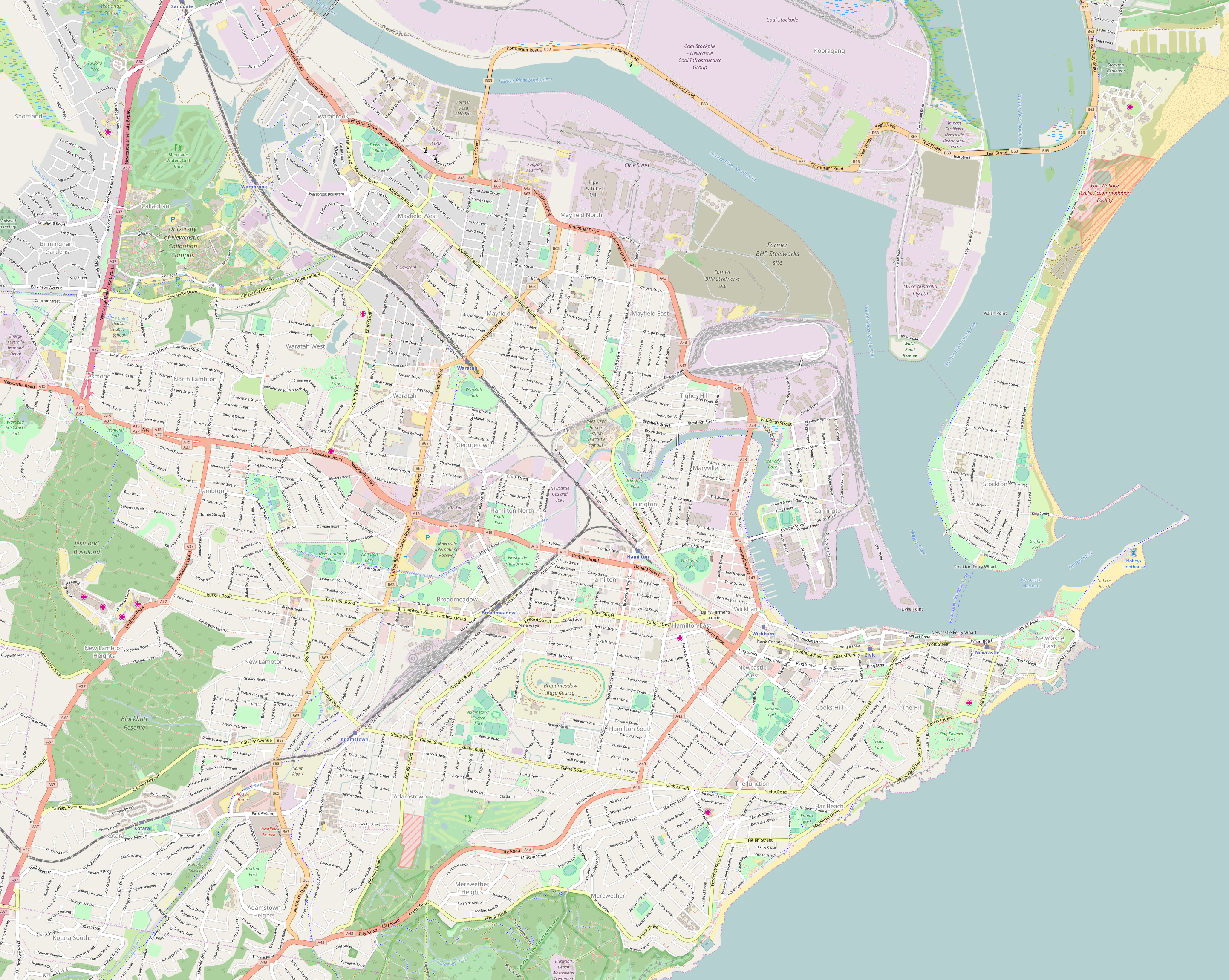
- Coordinates: 32°53′24″S 151°44′35″E
- Country: Australia
- State: New South Wales
- City: Newcastle
- LGA: City of Newcastle
- Location: 7 km (4.3 mi) NNW of Newcastle

Government
  - State electorate: Newcastle
  - Federal division: Newcastle
- Postcode: 2304
- Parish: Newcastle
Suburbs around Mayfield North
	Kooragang
Mayfield West	Mayfield North	Kooragang
	Mayfield	Tighes Hill

Mayfield North is a suburb of Newcastle, New South Wales, Australia.

It is basically an industrial estate, which extends north to the south arm of the Hunter River, west to Tourle Street, and south to Industrial Drive. Originally the estate comprised CSR Chemicals, Titans, Koppers, and part of the BHP Newcastle Steelworks (No2 Merchant Mill, Rod Mill, Limestone Kiln and Spares Yard). It has officially has population of zero.

== History ==
The Aboriginal people, in this area, the Awabakal, were the first people of this land.
