= Thornton railway station, New South Wales =

Railway station in New South Wales, Australia

Thornton
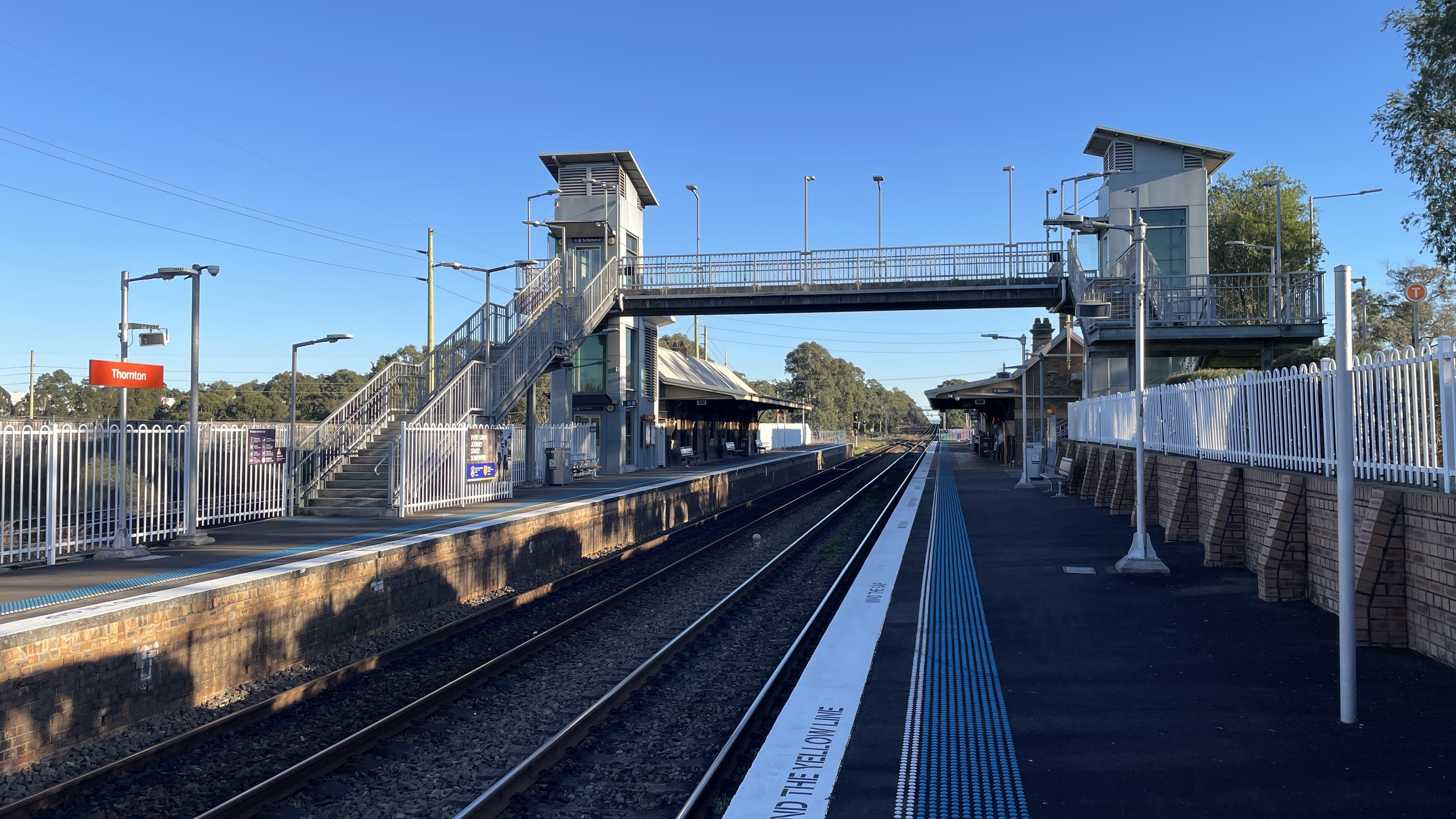
- Westbound view from Platform 1, July 2026

General information
- Location: Karuah Street, Thornton; Australia
- Coordinates: 32°47′01″S 151°38′23″E
- Owner: Transport Asset Manager of New South Wales
- Operator: Sydney Trains
- Line: Main Northern
- Distance: 182.19 kilometres (113.21 mi) from Central
- Platforms: 2 side
- Tracks: 4
- Connections: Bus

Construction
- Structure type: Ground
- Accessible: Yes

Other information
- Station code: THO
- Website: Transport for NSW

History
- Opened: 10 February 1913; 113 years ago
- Former names: Woodford (1871–1887)

Passengers
- 2025: 126,556 (year); 347 (daily) (Sydney Trains, NSW TrainLink)

Services
Preceding station	Intercity Trains	Following station
Metford towards Dungog or Scone	Hunter Line	Beresfield towards Newcastle Interchange
Location

Thornton railway station is located on the Main Northern line in New South Wales, Australia. It serves Thornton in the eastern suburbs of Maitland opening in 1913.

The original station site opened on 1 August 1871 as Woodford and was renamed in to Thornton in 1887 to avoid confusion with Woodford railway station in the Blue Mountains. The line from Tarro was duplicated in 1880 and quadrupled on 10 February 1913 when the current station site opened.

To the south-west of the station, the Bloomfield Colliery branches off.

== Platforms and services ==
Thornton has two side platforms. It is serviced by Sydney Trains Intercity Hunter Line services travelling from Newcastle to Maitland, Singleton, Muswellbrook, Scone, Telarah and Dungog.

Platform	Line	Stopping pattern	Notes
1	Hunter Line	services to Newcastle	
2	Hunter Line	services to Maitland, Telarah, Dungog, Singleton, Muswellbrook & Scone	

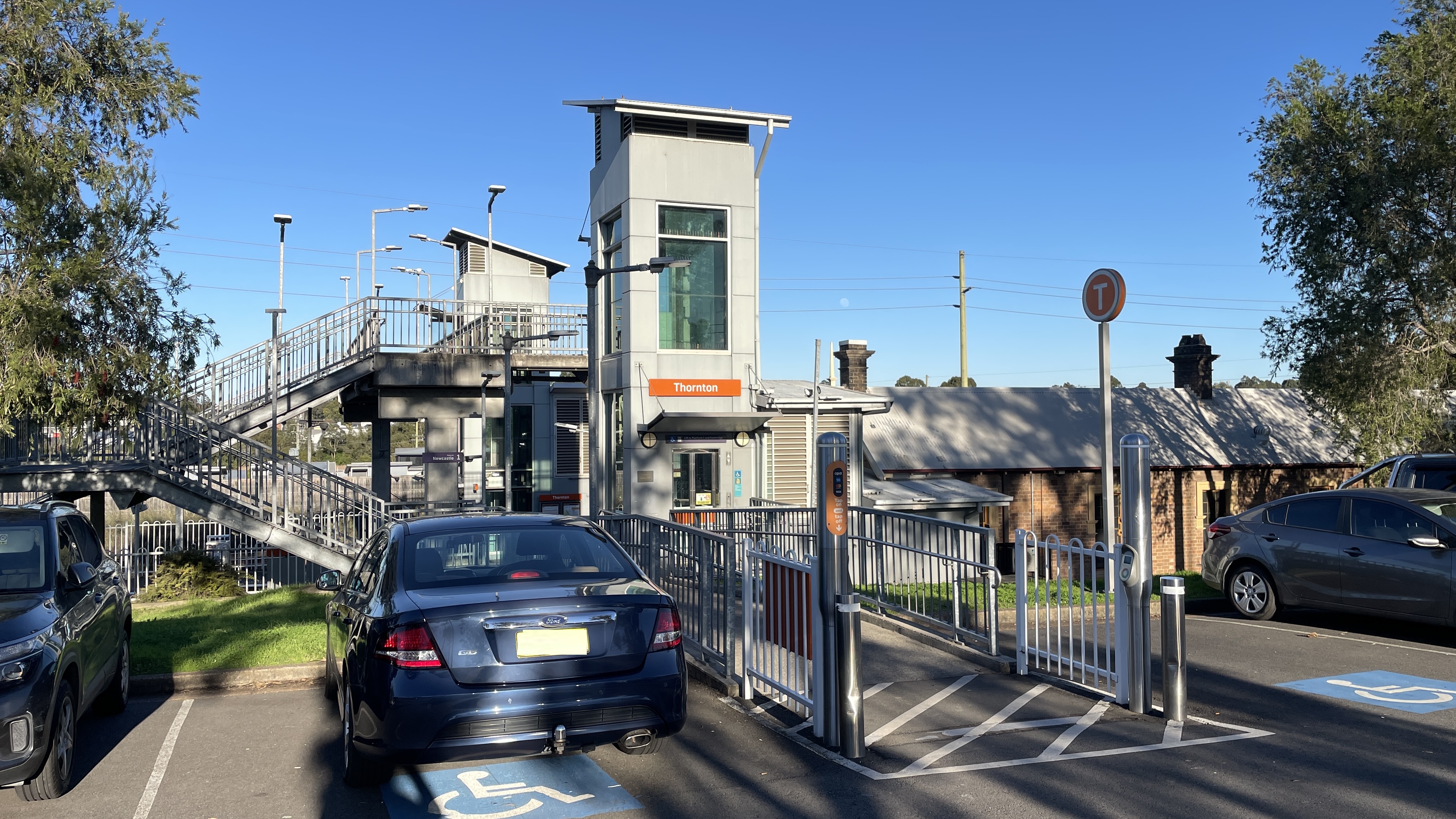
Entrance from Karuah Street

Eastbound view from Platform 1

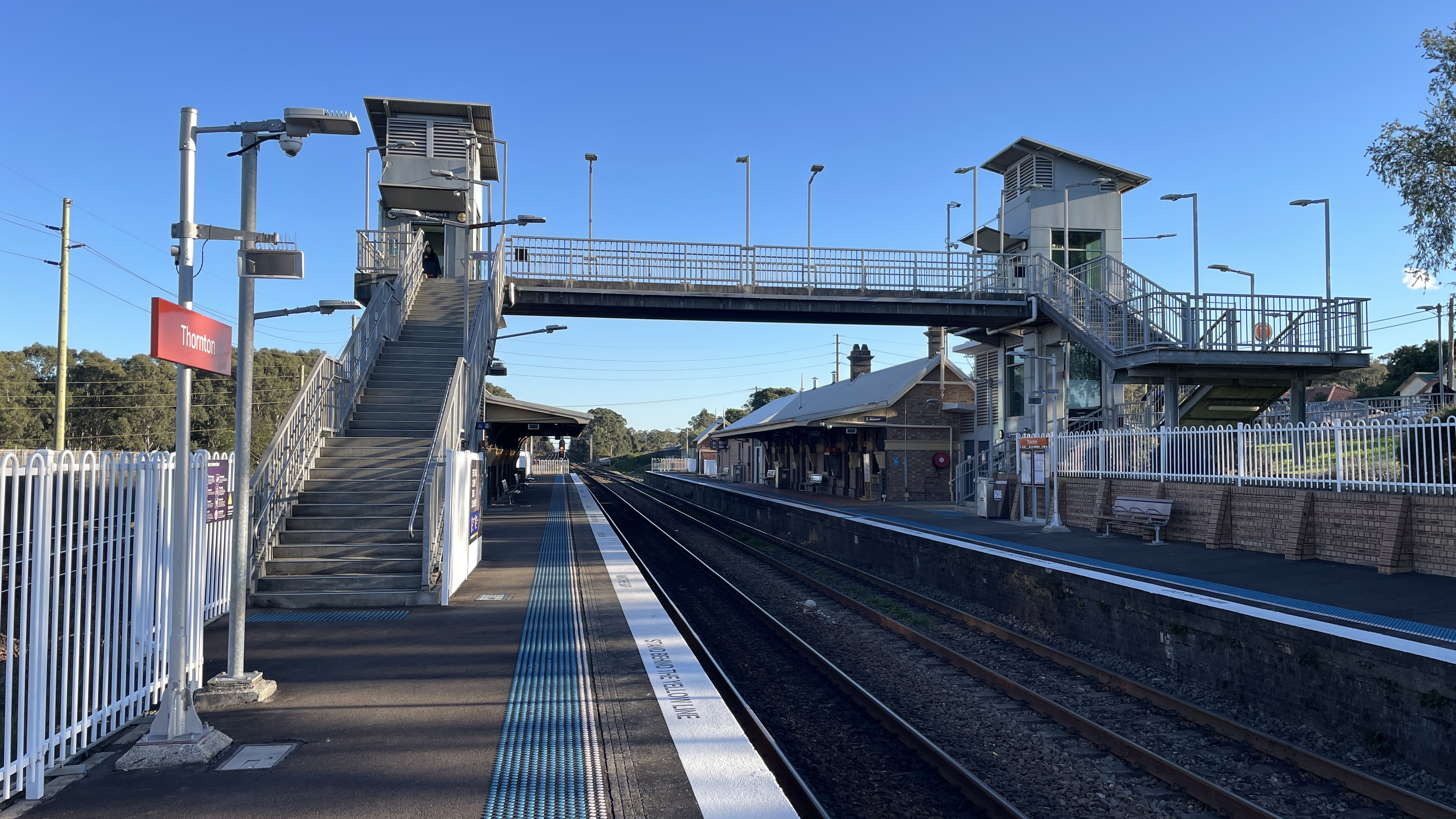
Westbound view from Platform 2

== Transport links ==
Hunter Valley Buses operates two bus routes via Thornton station, under contract to Transport for NSW:

- 182: to Rutherford
- 189: to Stockland Green Hills
