= HXM =

HXM may refer to:

- Hoveton & Wroxham railway station, in England
- Hexham railway station, New South Wales, Australia
