= Thornton, New South Wales =

Coordinates: 32°47′S 151°38.5′E

Thornton Maitland, New South Wales
- Population: 10,690 (SAL 2021)
- Postcode(s): 2322
- Area: 16.61 km^{2} (6.4 sq mi)
- LGA(s): City of Maitland
- Region: Hunter
- State electorate(s): Maitland
- Federal division(s): Paterson
Suburbs around Thornton:
	Chisholm	Beresfield
Metford	Thornton	Beresfield
Ashtonfield		Woodberry

Thornton is a suburb in the City of Maitland, New South Wales, Australia. It is bisected by the New England Highway.

Post code 2322, including Thornton, Beresfield, Tarro and Hexham, had a population of 14,654 in 2001. In 2021, this population has increased to 24,373.

== History ==
The traditional owners and custodians of the Maitland area are the Wonnarua people.

The suburb takes its name from Thornton railway station. The station was originally known as Woodford, but the name was changed to Thornton in 1887 and relocated to a new site in 1913.

== Transport ==
Thornton railway station opened in 1871. Thornton is serviced by Hunter Line trains of the NSW TrainLink network. Regular services take passengers east to Newcastle (18 minutes for the express) and west to Maitland. Less regular services also take passengers west to the Hunter Valley as far as Scone and north to Dungog.

Thornton is the junction for a colliery branch line leading to the Bloomfield Coal Loop, a 4.2 kilometre balloon loop.

A new industrial estate and increased residential subdivisions resulted in the Roads & Traffic Authority planning a major upgrade to the Weakleys Drive intersection, which was completed as of December 2008.

== Education ==
Thornton has a government primary school of Thornton Primary. It is also the home of Aspect Hunter School which offers schooling options for students with autism K-12 in the Hunter Valley.

== Business ==
Thornton has a higher amount of Technicians and Trades Workers than NSW and the rest of Australia (16.3% compared to 11.9% for NSW and 12.9% for the rest of Australia) This may be due to the nearby industrial areas surrounding Thornton located in Beresfield and Newcastle. This is also contrasted with the high amount of defence force workers whom represent 5.5% of the workforce in Thornton as opposed to 0.7% in the rest of Australia. Overall the residents of Thornton life predominantly a blue collar life, with professional work accounting for only 15.5% of the workforce as opposed to 25.8% in the rest of NSW.

== Summary ==
Thornton, New South Wales, as depicted by the 2021 Census, is a suburb with a population of 10,690, characterized by a nearly equal gender distribution, with 49.3% males and 50.7% females. The community has a relatively young demographic, with a median age of 32. Families in Thornton average 2.8 members per household, and the median household income is $2,051 weekly. In terms of housing, the median monthly mortgage repayment is $1,800, while the weekly rent is $400. The average number of motor vehicles per dwelling is 2.2.

Educationally, Thornton residents are diverse, with 14.6% holding a Bachelor's degree or higher, and 9.3% having completed an Advanced Diploma or Diploma. The cultural landscape is varied, with the most common ancestries being Australian (46.3%), English (42.5%), Scottish (10.1%), and Irish (9.2%). The suburb also has a notable Indigenous population, accounting for 7.1% of the total.

Marital status data reveals that 46.7% of individuals aged 15 and over are married, 3.7% are separated, 8.0% are divorced, 2.8% are widowed, and 38.8% have never married. The labor force participation rate for those aged 15 and over is 71.1%, and 73.0% of residents were engaged in unpaid domestic work in the week before the Census night.

In terms of transportation, the majority of individuals drive to work, with 59.7% using a car as the driver, while 16.9% work from home. Overall, Thornton emerges as a dynamic and diverse community, encompassing a range of demographics, educational backgrounds, and cultural heritages.
