= Woodberry, New South Wales =

Woodberry
- Suburb
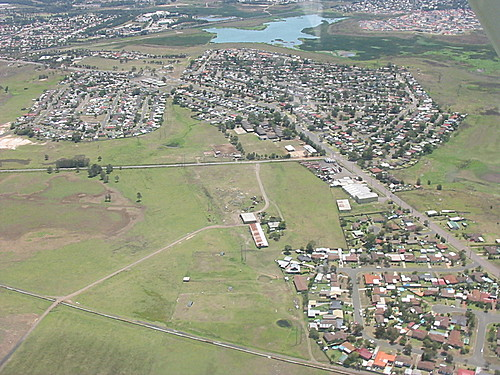
- Looking west over Woodberry from 300m above the ground.

- Coordinates: 32°47′24″S 151°40′4″E
- Country: Australia
- State: New South Wales
- Region: Hunter
- City: Maitland
- LGA: City of Maitland
- Location: 156 km (97 mi) N of Sydney; 22.5 km (14.0 mi) NW of Newcastle; 13.9 km (8.6 mi) ESE of Maitland; 11 km (6.8 mi) WSW of Raymond Terrace

Government
  - State electorate: Maitland
  - Federal division: Paterson

Area (Note: Area calculation is based on 1:100000 map 9232 NEWCASTLE.)
  - Total: 8.5 km^{2} (3.3 sq mi)
- Elevation: 9 m (30 ft)

Population
  - Total: 3,024 (SAL 2021)
  - Density: 2,310/km^{2} (6,000/sq mi) (Note: This is the average density of the residential part of the suburb where almost all of the population lives, not the average for the whole suburb which is considerably lower at 383/km^{2} (990/sq mi).)
- Time zone: UTC+10 (AEST)
  - Summer (DST): UTC+11 (AEDT)
- Postcode: 2322
- County: Northumberland
- Parish: Alnwick
Suburbs around Woodberry
| Thornton | Millers Forest | Heatherbrae |
| Thornton | Woodberry | Tomago |
| Beresfield | Tarro | Tarro, Tomago |

Woodberry is one of the easternmost suburbs of the City of Maitland in the Hunter Region of New South Wales, Australia. At the 2011 census, Woodberry's population was 3,155. Most of the population lives in residential subdivisions while almost 84% of the suburb's land is rural in nature. Rental accommodation is occupied by a third of the residents.

It lies to the west of the Hunter River, 2.4 kilometres (1.5 mi) of which forms the suburb's eastern border, separating it from Heatherbrae and Tomago in the Port Stephens local government area. It is connected by road to the adjoining suburbs of Millers Forest, Beresfield and Tarro. Much of Woodberry is low-lying floodplain and when the Hunter River floods, the roads to Millers Forest and Tarro sometimes become impassable. However, the residential area is elevated and access to Beresfield remains available.

The local Fred Harvey Sporting Complex located on Lawson Avenue is the home of the Woodberry Warriors Rugby league, and in the past has also been home to the now defunct Woodberry Athletics Club, cricket, baseball and football (soccer) clubs. The sporting complex was named after Woodberry resident and long serving volunteer groundskeeper, Fred Harvey. Fred prepared and maintained the cricket pitch from the mid 1970s until the late 1990s.

There is a government co-ed primary school called Woodberry Public School on Lawson Avenue in Woodberry.
