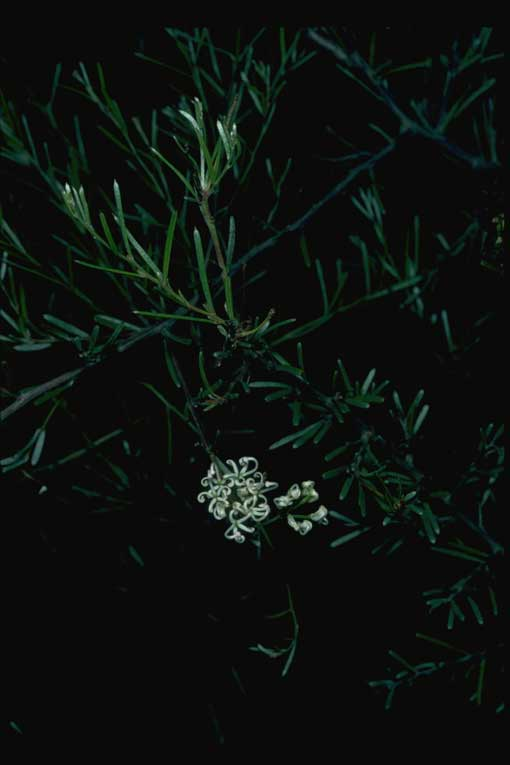
- In the Hunter Region Botanic Gardens

Conservation status
- Least Concern (IUCN 3.1)

- Priority Three — Poorly Known Taxa (DEC)

Scientific classification
- Kingdom: Plantae
- Clade: Embryophytes
- Clade: Tracheophytes
- Clade: Spermatophytes
- Clade: Angiosperms
- Clade: Eudicots
- Order: Proteales
- Family: Proteaceae
- Genus: Grevillea
- Species: G. costata

Binomial name
- Grevillea costata A.S.George

= Grevillea costata =

Species of shrub endemic to Western Australia

Grevillea costata is a species of flowering plant in the family Proteaceae and is endemic to the west of Western Australia. It is a spreading shrub with sharply-pointed, linear leaves and white flowers.

== Description ==
Grevillea costata is a spreading shrub that typically grows to a height of 0.8–1.5 m (2 ft 7 in – 4 ft 11 in) and has many ridged, silky-hairy branchlets. Its leaves are linear, 15–45 mm (0.59–1.77 in) long and 0.8–1.3 mm (0.031–0.051 in) wide with the edges rolled under, enclosing all but the mid-vein. The flowers are arranged in groups of four to ten in leaf axils or on the ends of branchlets and are white, the pistil 7.0–9.5 mm (0.28–0.37 in) long with a white to cream-coloured, sometimes pink style. Flowering occurs from May to September and the fruit is an elliptic to oblong follicle 9.5–11 mm (0.37–0.43 in) long with prominent ridges.

== Taxonomy ==
Grevillea costata was first formally described in 1974 by Alex George in the journal Nuytsia from specimens collected by Charles Gardner near rocks in the Murchison River in 1931. The specific epithet (costata) means "ribbed", referring to the fruit.

== Distribution and habitat ==
This grevillea grows in sand and among rocks in the river bed of the Murchison River in the Carnarvon, Geraldton Sandplains and Yalgoo biogeographic region of Western Australia.

== Conservation status ==
Grevillea costata is listed as least concern on the IUCN Red List of Threatened Species. Although its estimated extent of occurrence is relatively small at 6,000 km^{2} (2,300 sq mi), its population is stable and faces no known major threats. Most of this species' range occurs in the protected area of Kalbarri National Park.

It is also listed as priority three by the Government of Western Australia Department of Biodiversity, Conservation and Attractions, meaning that it is poorly known and known from only a few locations but is not under imminent threat.

== See also ==
- List of Grevillea species
