= Beresfield =

- Suburb
- Interactive map of Beresfield
- Coordinates: 32°47′56″S 151°38′06″E
- Country: Australia
- State: New South Wales
- City: Newcastle
- LGAs: City of Newcastle; City of Maitland
- Location: 22 km (14 mi) NNW of Newcastle; 12 km (7.5 mi) SE of Maitland

Government
  - State electorate: Wallsend
  - Federal division: Paterson

Population
  - Total: 3,267 (SAL 2021)
- Postcode: 2322
- Parish: Alnwick
Suburbs around Beresfield
Thornton	Woodberry	Woodberry
Thornton	Beresfield	Tarro
Buttai	Black Hill	Black Hill

Beresfield /ˈbɛrəsfiːld/ is a north-western suburb of Newcastle, New South Wales, Australia 22 kilometres (14 mi) from Newcastle's central business district. It is part of the City of Newcastle local government area.

== Population ==
According to the 2016 census of Population, there were 3,181 people in Beresfield.

- Aboriginal and Torres Strait Islander people made up 5.6% of the population.
- 86.0% of people were born in Australia and 89.4% of people only spoke English at home.
- The most common responses for religion were No Religion 25.5%, Anglican 25.2% and Catholic 24.9%.

== Geography ==
Beresfield, like the neighbouring suburbs of Tarro, Woodberry and Thornton, is located on a low ridge rising out of the surrounding floodplain and wetlands of the Hunter River. Beresfield is divided by Anderson Drive (formerly Maitland Road) which runs east to west. The part of Beresfield to the north of Anderson Drive includes the shopping centre and railway station. The part south of Anderson Drive includes the bowling club, swimming pool, sports oval, golf course and Newcastle Memorial Park cemetery and crematorium.

== Transport ==
It has a railway station, which opened in 1925. The station is served by NSW TrainLink's Hunter line. The suburb is bisected by the New England Highway.

== Facilities ==
The first public school in Beresfield was Upper Hexham Public School, now in the grounds of Beresfield Public School. The closest public secondary school is Francis Greenway High School.

Beresfield has a small shopping centre featuring a post office, banks, Food for Less (Woolworths) supermarket, newsagent, physiotherapist, doctors' surgeries, petrol stations, take-aways and other stores. There is a branch of the Newcastle Region Library and an unused police station.

Sporting facilities include a swimming pool, bowling club, golf course (which was ranked number one in Australia in 2020 and 2022), cricket oval and rugby and soccer fields.

Churches include the Anglican church of St Pauls, which held its first service in 1949. The first timber St Pauls and its hall were built in 1955. A second brick church was built in 1980 following a fire.

In the 1970s a new Roman Catholic parish church, Our Lady of Lourdes, was built at Beresfield. The original parish church had been located in Tarro. A station was opened at Beresfield and to serve as a mass centre a former Army hut was transported from Greta and erected where the present parish church now stands. St Jude's was demolished with the new church taking the title of the old Parish church.

Active clubs and associations include local Scouting, Girl Guides, Lions & Rotary Clubs. Beresfield Thornton Girl Guide District is a very active youth organisation. The Girl Guides continue to give service to the local community by participating in Clean Up Australia Day, fundraising for charity and collecting items for those less fortunate.

Beresfield is the location of Newcastle Memorial Park cemetery and crematorium.

== Sport ==
Beresfield has many sporting clubs including Thornton-Beresfield Bears Rugby League Club, Beresfield Memorial Cricket Club, Beresfield Football & Senior Soccer Clubs, Beresfield Touch Football, Beresfield Netball Club and Beresfield Golf Club.

== Industry ==
Beresfield has long been home to fathers employed in the mining industry in Newcastle.

The Kent Colliery was located in Beresfield. In the 1940s the colliery was the subject of an investigation into subsidence complaints.

A major employer in the area has been the Baiada/Steggles poultry processing plant.

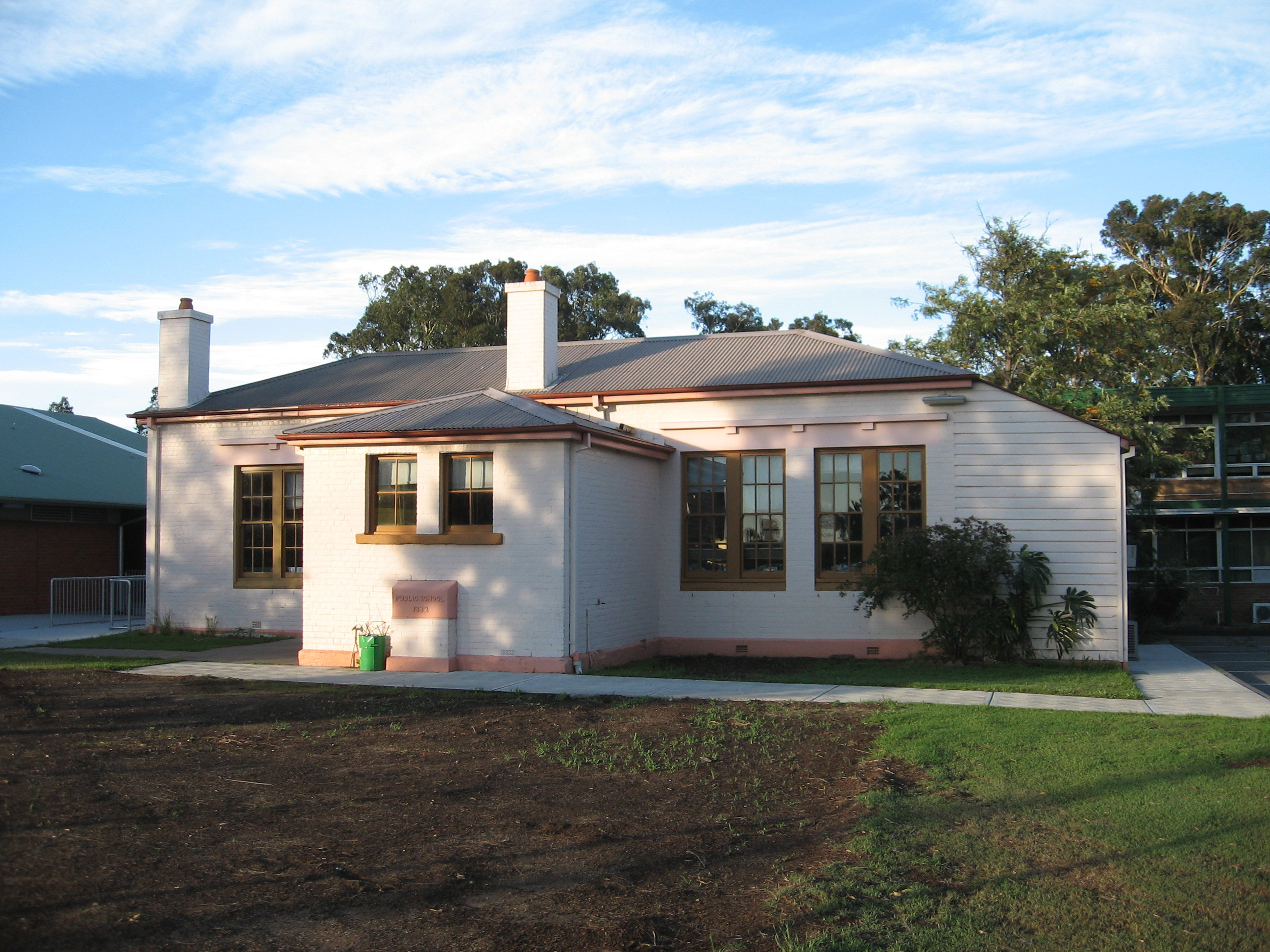
First public school in Beresfield, 1881

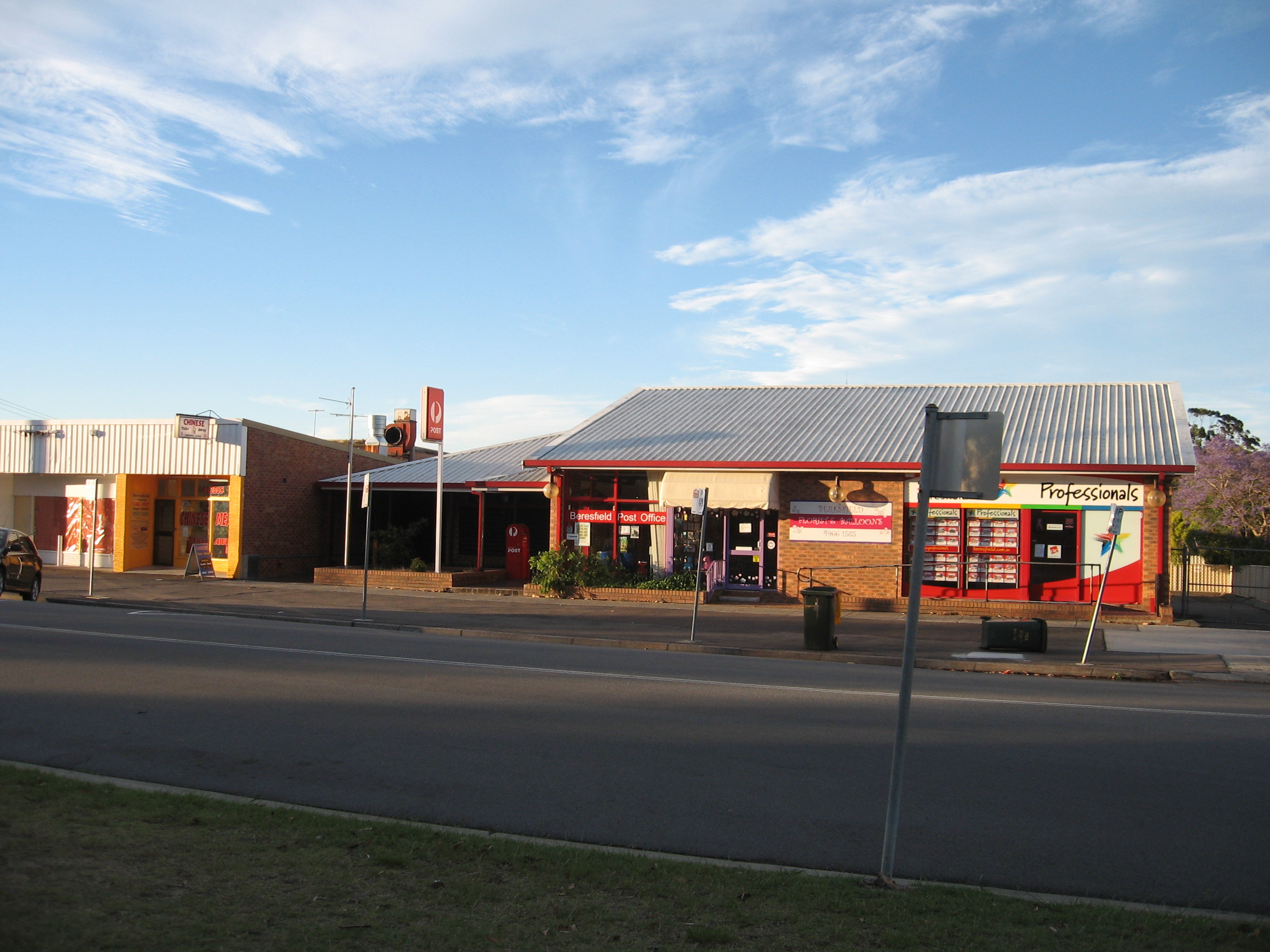
Beresfield Post Office
