= Tomago House =

- Location within New South Wales Location within Australia
- 32.8289°S 151.7349°E
- Location: Tomago Road, Tomago, Port Stephens Council, New South Wales, Australia

History
- Built: 1838–1840

Site notes
- Architect: Mortimer Lewis (attributed)
- Owner: National Trust of Australia (NSW)

New South Wales Heritage Register
- Official name: Tomago House & Tomago Chapel; Northbank Enterprise Hub
- Type: State heritage (landscape)
- Designated: 2 April 1999
- Reference no.: 207
- Type: Historic Landscape
- Category: Landscape – Cultural

Tomago House is a heritage-listed former residence and now house museum and function centre at Tomago Road, Tomago, New South Wales, Australia. It was built from 1838 to 1840. The design has been attributed to Mortimer Lewis. The property is owned by the National Trust of Australia (NSW). It was added to the New South Wales State Heritage Register on 2 April 1999.

== History ==
Richard Windeyer (1806–1847), journalist, barrister, agriculturist and politician, was born on 10 August 1806 in London, the eldest child of parliamentary reporter for "The Times", Charles Windeyer and his wife Ann Mary, née Rudd. He remained in England when in 1828 his parents with the rest of their family migrated to New South Wales. He was admitted as a student in the Middle Temple, London in March 1829 and called to the Bar on 23 May 1834. In the meantime, as a journalist and parliamentary reporter like his father, he was connected with The Times, The Morning Chronicle, The Sun and The Mirror, and in 1834 was London correspondent for The Australian, using the initials "W.R.". He assisted Dodd in compiling the Parliamentary Pocket Companion, and was associated with Colonel Thomas Perronet Thompson in the early anti-Corn Law movement.

On 26 April 1832 he married Maria, daughter of William Camfield of Groombridge Place and Burswood, Kent. Their only child, William Charles, was born on 29 September 1834. Although he always intended to follow his parents and their family to Sydney, Windeyer's departure from England was hastened by a letter from his father, saying that 'Dr Robert Wardell's death and Wentworth's expected departure and the division of the Bar makes the moment particularly favourable for your debut'. He set out with his wife and infant son arriving at Sydney on 28 November 1835.

Windeyer soon gained a considerable legal practice and became a leader of the bar. Even Rev. John Dunmore Lang described him as "a barrister of superior abilities" In July 1846 Windeyer and Robert Lowe appeared for the defendant in Attorney-General v. Brown, concerning the right of the Crown to grant the Australian Agricultural Company (the AA Co.) the sole right to mine coal near Newcastle. The arguments for the defendants failed, but enabled Windeyer to array much legal and historical learning in support of the political view that the lands of the colony should be in the control of the colonists, not in the grant of the Crown.

Windeyer's legal work was a small part of his activities in the colony. In February 1838 he bought his first land at Tomago in the Hunter Valley, not far from his father's farm at Tillegrah on the Williams River. By 1842 he held about 12,141 ha (30,000 acres). Vast sums of money were spent, especially on draining extensive swamp lands in the vicinity of Graham's Town, building a homestead at Tomago and on other improvements, but with little return.

He planted 12 ha (30 acres) of vines, imported a German vine-dresser from Adelaide, made his first wine in 1845 and received permission to import seven vine-dressers and one wine-cooper from Europe. The vineyard was established with plantings from James King of Irrawang, who was known to be producing good wines by 1840. Windeyer was one of the first successful vignerons on the Hunter.

Windeyer commenced building Tomago house in 1840. Its design is attributed to New South Wales Colonial Architect, Mortimer Lewis. Lewis' private commissions show a dependence on published sources, identified in recent years by architectural historian James Broadbent. "Fernhill" and "Tomago" boast separate entrance and garden fronts at right angles to each other, the garden fronts marked by bay windows. Their plants are probably adapted from the British architect William Wilkins' design for "Oxberton House", Nottinghamshire, as published by George Richardson in the "New Vitruvius Britannicus" (1802–08). The financial crisis of 1842 affected Windeyer severely.

In 1842 Windeyer was present at the meeting at Sydney College at which petitions for representative government in the colony were adopted. In 1843 at the first elections for the New South Wales Legislative Council he stood for Durham County successfully.

Windeyer at once took a prominent part in the affairs of the council. In 1843 he introduced his monetary confidence bill. Believing that the current depression was aggravated by a decrease of currency in circulation, and a lack of confidence and credit, he proposed a solution based on the Prussian Pfandbrief scheme as outlined by Thomas Holt before a select committee: the government was to give credit in the form of pledge certificates, or Pfandbriefe, on the security of land. The bill passed the council, but Governor Gipps withheld his assent.

Windeyer's main interest in economic matters was directed at effective supervision and control by the council of revenue and expenditure. He worked so persistently for retrenchment that Lang described him as "the Joseph Hume of the Council". As a believer in free trade and the representative of an agricultural county, Windeyer worked to open the Van Diemen's Land market to tobacco from New South Wales and the United Kingdom market to the colony's wheat. In the debate on the tariff bill of 1843, however, he voted for an import duty of 1s. a bushel on foreign wheat but explained that he considered it a revenue not a protective duty.

Always interested in education, Windeyer set up a school on his estate, was on the committees of the Sydney Mechanics' School of Arts and the Australian School Society, and prominent in the education debates. He was a member of the Aborigines Protection Society. His attention had been attracted to their legal disadvantages in the trial of an Aboriginal, Murrell, and the trials arising out of the Myall Creek massacre in which he had appeared. As the law stood, Aboriginals were not allowed to give evidence in the courts because they could not understand the nature of an oath. Windeyer supported proposals, later adopted, that they should be allowed to make unsworn statements. On his motion a select committee was appointed in 1845 to consider Aboriginal welfare, but it ceased work with his death.

In his political activities Windeyer was no friend of Governor Gipps. In the disputes arising from Gipps's squatting regulations of 1844 he took a middle line between squatters and the executive. He condemned the squatters as "cormorants" and "robbers", but he also opposed the regulations, as he objected to the executive powers on which they were supposedly based. He, with Lang, Lowe and William Bland, led a "constitutional" party who sought to secure control of the land revenue for the colonial legislature. It was not as an advocate of squatting interests, but rather because of his insistence on what he asserted was correct constitutional doctrine, that he became a member of the committee of the Pastoral Association. In the Legislative Council he worked hard for what he believed were the interests of the colony and after each session he made a point of touring his electorate to give an account of his stewardship.

Windeyer at Tomago ran cattle, horses and pigs, tried growing sugar-cane and wheat, and in 1846 with Reynolds, president of the local agricultural society, he imported the colony's first reaping machine from South Australia. Despite all his expensive improvements and mechanized farming the one prize he won was for pumpkins. However, after his death wine from Tomago won a certificate of merit at Paris in 1855.

Progress on Tomago House was slow, hampered by the 1840s depression. It seems likely that the house was fit for habitation by 1847. The house formed the nucleus of what was, in the mid-19th century, a vast agricultural estate and the country residence of one of the nation's leading politico-legal figures.

The house comprises two distinct buildings to which some modern structures have been added. The first phase was between 1842 and 1847, construction of the main stone house. Clear evidence exists to confirm that the house was originally constructed with a slate roof. Little is known of the early form of the gardens at Tomago, though a sundial pedestal is mentioned in 1848.

When in 1843 Windeyer added to his farm management and his immense legal practice the cares of a legislator in the Legislative Council, his health broke down and he was compelled to retire. Ill from overwork, financial worries and some internal disease, Windeyer died on a holiday near Launceston, 2 December 1847, when his role was far from completed. But his private affairs had suffered. His optimism and enterprise had led him to entertain projects that he could not afford and to incur large debts. From this cause and the economic depression of the 1840s, he died impoverished. His widow, a woman of remarkable character and determination, was enabled by money received from her family to retain a part of Tomago, where she lived, devoting herself to the prudent management of the property, the welfare of her infant son and local affairs.

Although most of the 12,141 ha (30,000 acres) holding passed out of family ownership his widow Maria was able to retain the house and 344 ha (850 acres). The estate included a range of outbuildings comprising a gatehouse, stables and dairy. Maria was left to complete the property, refinance it and maintain viability. This she did, adding to it with a Chapel built in 1860–1861.

Maria Windeyer was determined not to return to Sydney as she had grown to love Tomago. Her interest in the property is thought to have continued after her death, with inexplicable sightings of an elderly woman rocking in her chair on the verandah, and keeping a watchful eye in the cellars.

Little is known of the early form of the gardens at Tomago, though a sundial pedestal is mentioned in 1848. Windeyer's untimely death and his wife's, initially, straitened circumstances have led to the assumption that the house had little or no gardens. Photographic and documentary evidence, and the bones of earlier planting strongly suggest that by the early 20th century there was a well developed landscape at Tomago. This included tree-lined drives, a pleasure garden located in the adjoining wetlands which were drained by a series of canals, a stone weir, an orchard and a kitchen garden. According to the 1846 memoirs of Margaret Traill Bartlett the gardens and orchards were "extensive and lovely, there was a lovers" walk, great magnolia trees at the side of the house, orchards made up of date palms, love apples, lemon and other citrus trees, mulberries and other fruit. The flower gardens were on one side terraced down to the river.'. The garden retains some venerable trees and other plants, such as stone pines (Pinus pinea), evergreen or southern magnolia/bull bay (Magnolia grandiflora), giant bamboo (Bambusa balcooa) etc.

Between 1850 and 1880 a second stage of construction occurred – of a brick caretaker's cottage. This was originally a two storeyed building. It was reduced to a single storey cottage around 1950 when its brickwork was considered unsafe.

Tomago House is noted for its fine verandahs looking over pastoral land; underground cellars were completed in time for the 1868 harvest; remnants of the 19th-century pleasure gardens; interiors which reflect the lives and times of a family of status and a social history which spans three generations of one of Australia's most distinguished families.

In 1944 Tomago House was purchased by the British textile firm of Courtaulds. The house was renovated for use as a manager's residence.

The modern structures on site date from the 1940s or 1950s and include the enclosure of the south-east verandah, a brick garage and laundry on the west corner of the caretaker's cottage and a timber garage on the north-east side of the caretaker's cottage.

In c. 1970 it was acquired by a Mrs James as her residence and she installed a swimming pool (since filled in).

In the 1980s the estate was held by two owners. When the Tomago aluminium smelter was established, the firm acquired Tomago House as part of the buffer zone established around the facility. In 1988 Tomago Aluminium gave 5 ha (12 acres) with the house to the National Trust of Australia (NSW). Le Seuer cites the date of this gift as 1986.

The site of Tomago Aluminium smelter is rich in industrial history. A coal mine was established here in the early 19th century. Later the Courtaulds Textile Factory was here until 1976. In 1981 Tomago Aluminium began construction, In September 1983 aluminium production started. At that time Tomago Aluminium was the first large scale AP18 plant to be built in the world. Annual production capacity was 250,000 tonnes a year. It has since expanded to produce 525,000 tonnes per year – the largest aluminium smelter in Australia. In 1986 to celebrate it bicentenary Tomago Aluminium donated five hectares of land which included the house to the national trust.

In 1998 the National Trust reconstructed the picket fence of the chapel (on a different boundary line to the original and to a different design) and replanted the avenue linking the chapel and the house but with a different tree species. The National Trust currently uses the property as a function centre.

The Friends of Tomago House have managed the estate since 1997.

An October 2013 bushfire came within 20m of the house but it was secured thanks to volunteers and the New South Wales Rural Fire Service, with no damage. The annual Camellia Festival and All Italian Day have become signature events.

In April 2015 severe storms led to extensive damage to a number of mature trees at Tomago House, involving many collapsing, damaging other trees, structures and in part the house. This devastation closed the property down for about 6 months, while it could be made safe for caretaker and visitor access and use again. Hunter Horticultural Services has assessed the damage and in two stages removed the worst-affected trees that could not be saved, and other damaged trees beyond repair and likely to fail in the future. In addition a condition audit was done on all remaining trees on the site. The National Trust is commissioning a landscape plan for the property including proposed future plantings in accordance with the site's conservation management plan.

== Description ==
=== Estate and grounds ===
The present estate is 5 ha (12 acres) of parkland. Once it was 2,023 ha (5,000 acres), and the house was accessed primarily from the Hunter River, walking up to the house which stands on a small knoll with expansive views to and from it. The house was oriented for vistas to Mt. Sugarloaf although these are today blocked by trees. The 12 ha (30 acres) vineyard was established, with plantings from James King of Irrawang, who was known to be producing good wines by 1840.

Tomago House retains the core of a once larger rural estate, with its sweeping entrance carriage drives off Tomago Road approaching the house from the north-west, and another drive towards the chapel to the west. The drive is lined with jacarandas (Jacaranda mimosifolia), an evergreen magnolia / bull bay (M.grandiflora) and lemon-scented gums (Corymbia citriodora).

The grounds are fairly thickly planted with mature coniferous trees reflecting the fashion for pineta or conifer collections in the 19th century – these comprise predominantly exotic pine species including Mediterranean stone pine (Pinus pinea), Monterey pine (California: Pinus radiata), bunya pine (Queensland: Araucaria bidwillii), Norfolk Island pine (Araucaria heterophylla) and hoop pine trees (Northern NSW/ Queensland: Araucaria cunninghamii).

Other major trees include a number of large old Moreton Bay figs (Ficus macrophylla), locally-native turpentines (Syncarpia glomulifera), 20th-century plantings of jacarandas (Jacaranda mimosifolia), Qld. lemon-scented gums (Corymbia citriodora) on both carriage loops and a large 19th-century mature bull bay / evergreen or southern magnolia (M.grandiflora) south of the house towards the river terrace. Another unusual tree here is the South African Cape chestnut (Cupania capensis), north of the house. Large clumps of Mauritius hemp (Furcraea selloa) remain underneath the trees north of the house. Two large clumps of giant bamboo (Bambusa balcooa) are on the terrace south of the house and in the ephemeral lagoon area to the south, in the vicinity of the (lost) pleasure garden there. A solitary date palm (Phoenix dactylifera) is north-west of the house on the grass terrace and several tall old specimens of locally-native cabbage palms (Livistona australis) remain in the lagoon area south of the house, probably predating it. A number of Qld. silky oaks (Grevillea robusta), Northern-NSW/Qld. brush box (Lophostemon confertus), locally-native red ash (Alphitonia excelsa), American sweet gum (Liquidambar styraciflua) trees are also in the grounds.

Near the front door of the house on the northern side a large orchid tree (Bauhinia variegata cv.) is covered with staghorn ferns.

Other native species include smooth-barked apple/Sydney red gum (Angophora costata), native peach (Breynia oblongifolia), Qld. lacebark (Brachychiton discolor), Qld. black bean/native chestnut (Castanospermum australe); tuckeroo (Cupaniopsis anacardioides); corkwood (Endiandra sieberi); bangalay (Eucalyptus botryoides); W.A. yellow bloodwood (Corymbia eximia); flooded gum (E.grandis); tallowood (E.microcorys); blackbutt (E.pilularis); white mahogany (E. spp. (?E.acmenioides)); cheese tree (Glochidion ferdinandi); broad-leaved paperbark (Melaleuca quinquenervia); white cedar (Melia azedarach); tree broom/heath (Monotoca elliptica); Qld./N.NSW firewheel tree (Stenocarpus sinuatus); magenta lily pilly (Syzygium paniculatum); red cedar (Toona ciliata) and woody pear (Xylomelum pyriforme); Darling or river lily (Crinum sp.); she oak (Casuarina sp.).

Other exotic species include Cape chestnut (Calodendrum capense); Atlas cedar (Cedrus atlantica); camphor laurel (Cinnamomum camphora); Monterey cypress (Hesperocyparis macrocarpa); cockspur coral tree (Erythrina crista-galli); crepe myrtle (Lagerstroemia indica cv.); Hupeh crab apple (Malus hupehensis); oleander (Nerium oleander cv.); avocado (Persea americana cv.); Mexican weeping pine (Pinus patula); Eastern cottonwood (Populus deltoides), Lombardy poplar (P.nigra 'Italica'); plum (Prunus domestica cv.); peach (P.persica cv.); pear (Pyrus communis cv.); cherry guava (Psidium cattleyanum); tree gardenia (Rothmannia globosa); pepper tree (Schinus molle); Camellia japonica cv. shrubs; autumn camellias (Camellia sasanqua cv.s); oranges (Citrus sinensis cv.); Hibiscus spp.; French lavender (Lavandula dentata); Cocos Island palm (Syagrus romanzoffiana); star jasmine (Trachelospermum jasminoides); laurustinus (Viburnum tinus); London or hybrid plane (Platanus x acerifolia); and Chinese wisteria (Wisteria sinensis).

=== Other structures ===
The estate included a range of outbuildings comprising a gatehouse, stables and dairy. A Chapel was added in 1860–1861 west of the house in paddock surroundings. A caretaker's cottage was added between 1850s–1880s – originally two storeys, in brick. This was reduced to a single storey cottage in the 1950s.

=== House ===
Built by barrister Richard Windeyer, Tomago House formed the nucleus of what was, in the mid-19th century, a vast agricultural estate and the country residence of one of the nation's leading politico-legal figures.

Work on the house started in the early 1840s. The house comprises two distinct buildings to which some modern structures have been added. The first phase was between 1842 and 1847, construction of the main stone house. Clear evidence exists to confirm that the house was originally constructed with a slate roof.

Tomago House is noted for its fine verandas looking over pastoral land; underground cellars completed in time for the 1868 harvest, remnants of the 19th-century pleasure grounds; interiors which reflected the lives and times of a family of status and a social history which spans three generations.

Between 1850 and 1880 a second stage of construction occurred – of a brick caretaker's cottage. This was originally a two storeyed building. It was reduced to a single storey cottage around 1950 when its brickwork was considered unsafe.

The modern structures date from the 1940s or 1950s and include the enclosure of the south-east verandah, a brick garage and laundry on the west corner of the caretaker's cottage and a timber garage on the north-east side of the caretaker's cottage.

=== Condition ===
The building in its present form represents an 1840s building much altered during its history. Apart from the polished cedar joinery and plaster ceilings its present decoration is the result of the 1950s occupation by Courtaulds.

The Monterey pines (Pinus radiata) are ailing which could be due to age (this species generally lives to around 100 years although it can survive to 140 years in NSW) or possibly be due to aluminium smelter development nearby and high fluoride issues. Cows in nearby paddocks show fluoride levels are excessive – in their teeth. Needle rot (Cyclaneusma and Sphaeropsis fungi spread by windborne spores in spring and warm, humid summers are also a cause of problems. Their decline could also possibly be due to salinity as the site is only between 5 and 2.5 m above sea level.

=== Modifications and dates ===
- c. 1847: 12,141 ha (30,000 acres) reduced to 344 ha (850 acres) estate
- c. 1848: mention of a sundial pedestal in the garden
- 1861 chapel added.
- c. 1868: cellars in use.
- 1850–1880: a second stage of construction occurred – of a brick caretaker's cottage. This was originally a two storeyed building.
- 1879+: Justice W. C. Windeyer added the corrugated iron and cast iron columned verandah and barrel roofed clerestory, changing the form of the roof. The main feature – the semi-circular bays – was changed to 7 sided pillar hipped roofs. ALso the re-cladding altered the eaves.
- 1890s: original slate roof was by now a metal roof (unpainted) with the clerestory roof painted in alternating stripes (photographic evidence).
- 1944: sold to Courtaulds (British textile firm) for use as manager's house
- c. 1950: caretaker's 2 storey building reduced to a single storey cottage
- 1952: alterations by Courtaulds to upgrade the house. Kitchen established in its present location and the dining room moved to the main hall. The former dining room became a billiard room, the former study became a bedroom with ensuite, and a second bathroom was added in the east verandah, plaster ceilings throughout were strengthened with timber battens and new fireplace surrounds introduced. The former kitchen building was converted into a self-contained cottage.
- c. 1970: sold to Mrs James who added a swimming pool (since filled in)
- 1986: donated to National Trust of Australia (NSW) who have since used it as a function centre.
- 1998: reconstructed picket fence of the chapel on a different boundary line and to a different design; replanted the avenue from the house to the chapel with a different species.
- February 2008: very large stone pine at the entrance rolled out of the ground – storm damaged in 2007
- 2015: severe April storms led to the necessity to remove a number of fallen, damaged, dead or dangerous trees to make the site safe to access and use, including opening it back to the public. Stage one tree removals were four trees along the northern boundary fence and 11 chiefly south of the southernmost drive. These were mainly stone pines (Pinus pinea), as well as tallowwood (Eucalyptus microcorys), jacaranda (J.mimosifolia). Stage two tree removals were more generally arrayed to the north, west and south-west of the house. These were largely Monterey pines (Pinus radiata) and lemon-scented gums (Corymbia citriodora). Other trees removed were stone pines, brush box (Lophostemon confertus), blackbutt (Eucalyptus pilularis), tallowwood, bangalay (E.botryoides), Sydney red gum/smooth-barked apple (Angophora costata), an Atlas cedar (Cedrus atlantica), jacaranda, camphor laurel (Cinnamommum camphora), silky oak (Grevillea robusta), turpentine (Syncarpia glomulifera), cottonwood (Populus deltoides),.

== Heritage listing ==
The principal heritage significance of Tomago House relates to its association with the Windeyer family. The house was the family home for 150 years of one of the most eminent legal families in New South Wales. It was built in a style and to a standard which befitted the social status of the Windeyers in the early years of expansion and development in the colony. It is one of the most important houses of the 1840s to survive largely unaltered in a geographical context which is also intact.

Built by Sydney barrister and politician Richard Windeyer, Tomago House formed the nucleus of what was, in the mid-19th century, a vast agricultural estate and the country residence of one of the nation's leading politico-legal figures.

Work on the house started in the early 1840s. The vineyard was established, with plantings from James King of Irrawang, who was known to be producing good wines by 1840. Windeyer died in 1847, leaving his widow Maria to complete the property, refinance it and maintain viability. This she did, adding to it with a Chapel built in 1860–1861.

Tomago House is noted for its fine verandahs looking over pastoral land; interiors which reflected the lives and times of a family of status and a social history which spans three generations.

Tomago today retains its original form, with its trees, farmland and wetlands. Planting is historically and botanically significant, including species contemporary with the early to late European development of the site from the 1830s to the 1890s, and remnant indigenous species.

Tomago House and Chapel was listed on the New South Wales State Heritage Register on 2 April 1999.

== See also ==
- Australian residential architectural styles
