= Black Hill, New South Wales =

Black Hill
- Suburb
- Coordinates: 32°50′24″S 151°36′43″E
- Country: Australia
- State: New South Wales
- City: Newcastle
- LGA(s): City of Newcastle; City of Cessnock; City of Maitland
- Location: 26 km (16 mi) NW of Newcastle; 14 km (8.7 mi) SSE of Maitland

Government
  - State electorate(s): Cessnock
  - Federal division(s): Paterson

Population
  - Total(s): 516 (SAL 2021)
- Postcode: 2322
- Parish: Newcastle
Suburbs around Black Hill
Four Mile Creek, Buchanan	Beresfield, Four Mile Creek	Tarro, Beresfield
Buttai	Black Hill	Hexham
Buchanan	Lenaghan, Stockrington	Fletcher

Black Hill is a rural locality and suburb of Newcastle, New South Wales, Australia, located 26 kilometres (16 mi) northwest of Newcastle's central business district. It is part of the City of Newcastle and City of Cessnock local government areas.

== Black Hill Public School ==
Black Hill Public School is a small school located on Blackhill Road. It was founded in 1881. Notable people who received education at this school include Sydney Swans player Isaac Heeney, the grandchildren and great-grandchildren of Australian politician Milton Morris, and Reilly Stevenson who held the title of School President in 2015, along with 2 chess championship awards and 1 handball championship award.

== Population ==
Black Hill had a population of 516 at the 2021 census. 89.7% of people were born in Australia and 95.0% of people only spoke English at home. The most common responses for religion were No Religion 42.6%, Anglican 17.1% and Catholic 15.9%.
