= Beresfield railway station =

Railway station in New South Wales, Australia

Beresfield
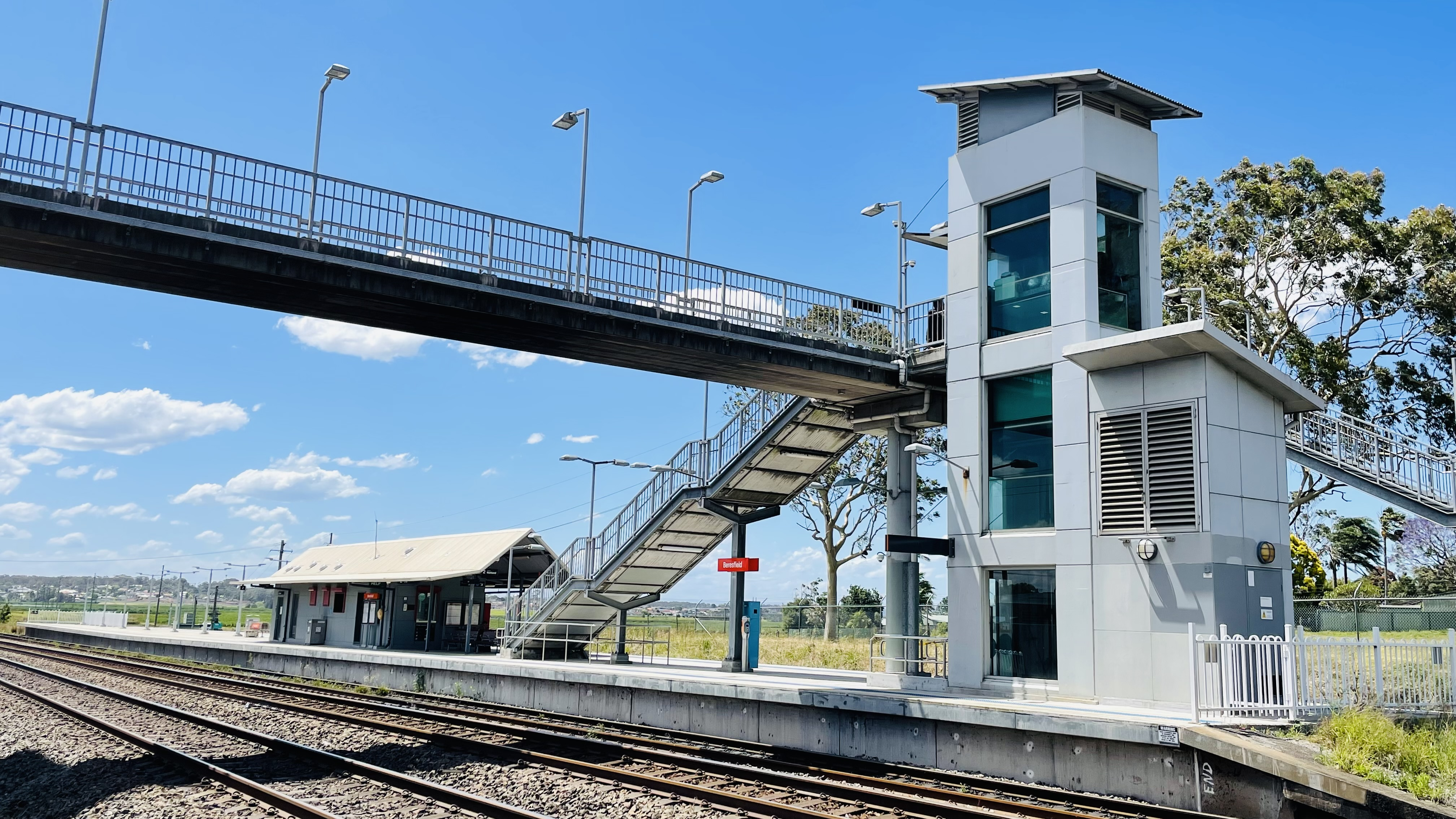
- Westbound view of the station platforms and footbridge, November 2022

General information
- Location: Addison Street, Beresfield; Australia
- Coordinates: 32°47′56″S 151°39′28″E
- Owner: Transport Asset Manager of New South Wales
- Operator: Sydney Trains
- Line: Main Northern
- Distance: 179.81 kilometres (111.73 mi) from Central
- Platforms: 2 (1 island)
- Tracks: 4

Construction
- Structure type: Ground
- Accessible: Yes

Other information
- Status: Weekdays: Staffed: 6am–6pm: Weekends and public holidays: Unstaffed
- Website: Transport for NSW

History
- Opened: 31 July 1925; 101 years ago
- Rebuilt: 2002

Passengers
- 2025: 75,177 (year); 206 (daily) (Sydney Trains, NSW TrainLink)

Services
Preceding station	Intercity Trains	Following station
Thornton towards Dungog or Scone	Hunter Line	Tarro towards Newcastle Interchange
Thornton towards Dungog or Scone	Hunter Line	Warabrook towards Newcastle Interchange
Location

Beresfield railway station is located on the Main Northern line in New South Wales, Australia. It opened on 31 July 1925, serving the western Newcastle suburb of Beresfield.

== History ==
Beresfield railway station opened on 31 July 1925.

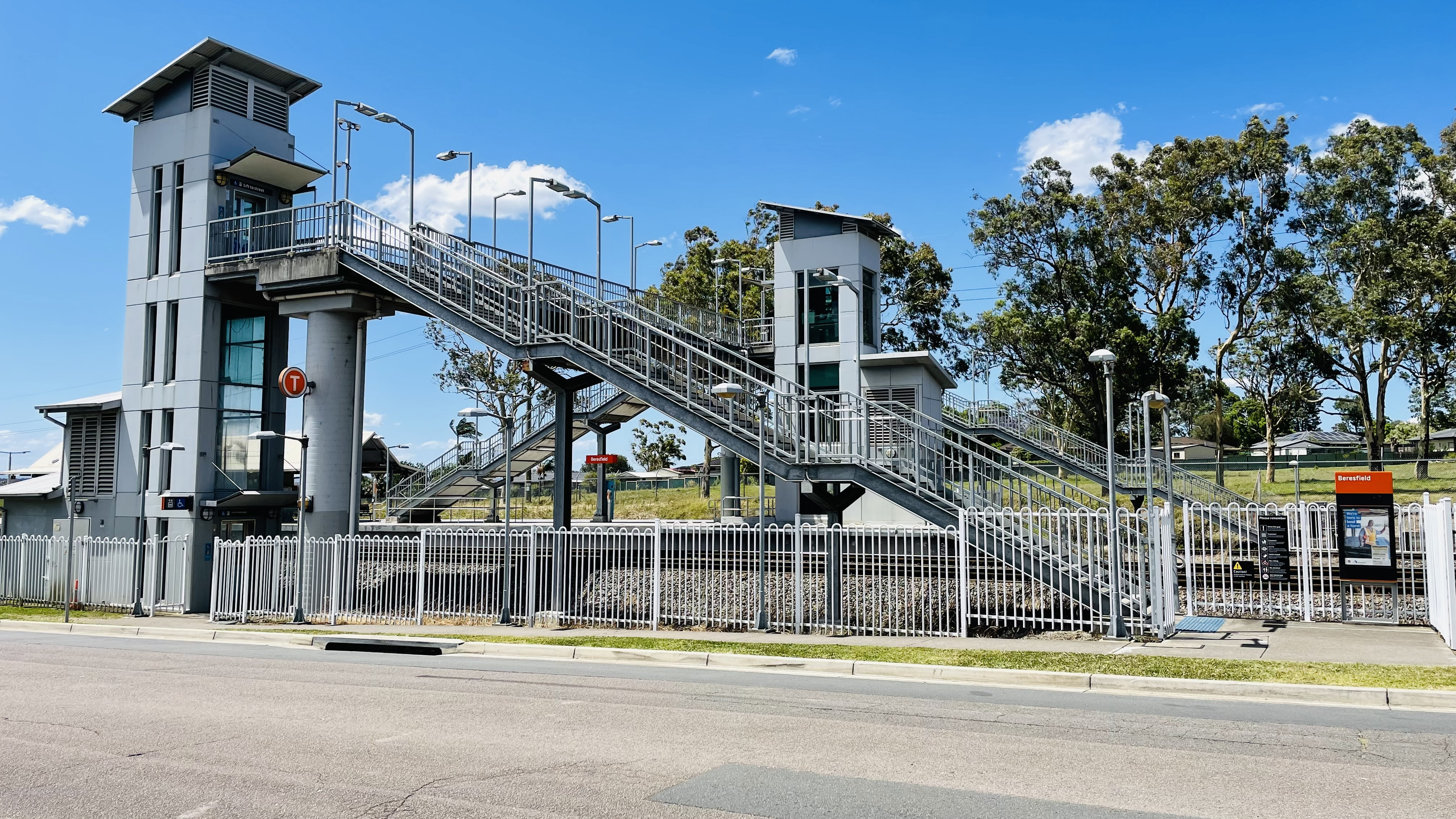
Entrance from Addison Street

=== 1997 collision ===
On 23 October 1997, Beresfield was the site of a major rail accident, when a FreightCorp coal train passed a red signal and collided with the rear of another coal train standing on the same track. Six people were injured, including the station master and a passenger who jumped from the platform moments before the collision. The crash resulted in dozens of coal wagons tumbling over the platform and across the tracks, blocking all four tracks and destroying most of the station. Three 82 class locomotives were destroyed.

In 2002, Beresfield was fully redeveloped, receiving new easy-access facilities, station signage and booking office.

== Platforms and services ==
Beresfield has one island platform with two faces. It is serviced by Sydney Trains Intercity Hunter Line services travelling from Newcastle to Maitland, Singleton, Muswellbrook, Scone, Telarah and Dungog.

Platform	Line	Stopping pattern	Notes
1	HUN	services to Newcastle	
2	HUN	services to Maitland, Telarah, Dungog, Singleton, Muswellbrook & Scone	
