= Hexham Bridge, New South Wales =

Bridge in New South Wales, Australia

Hexham Bridge
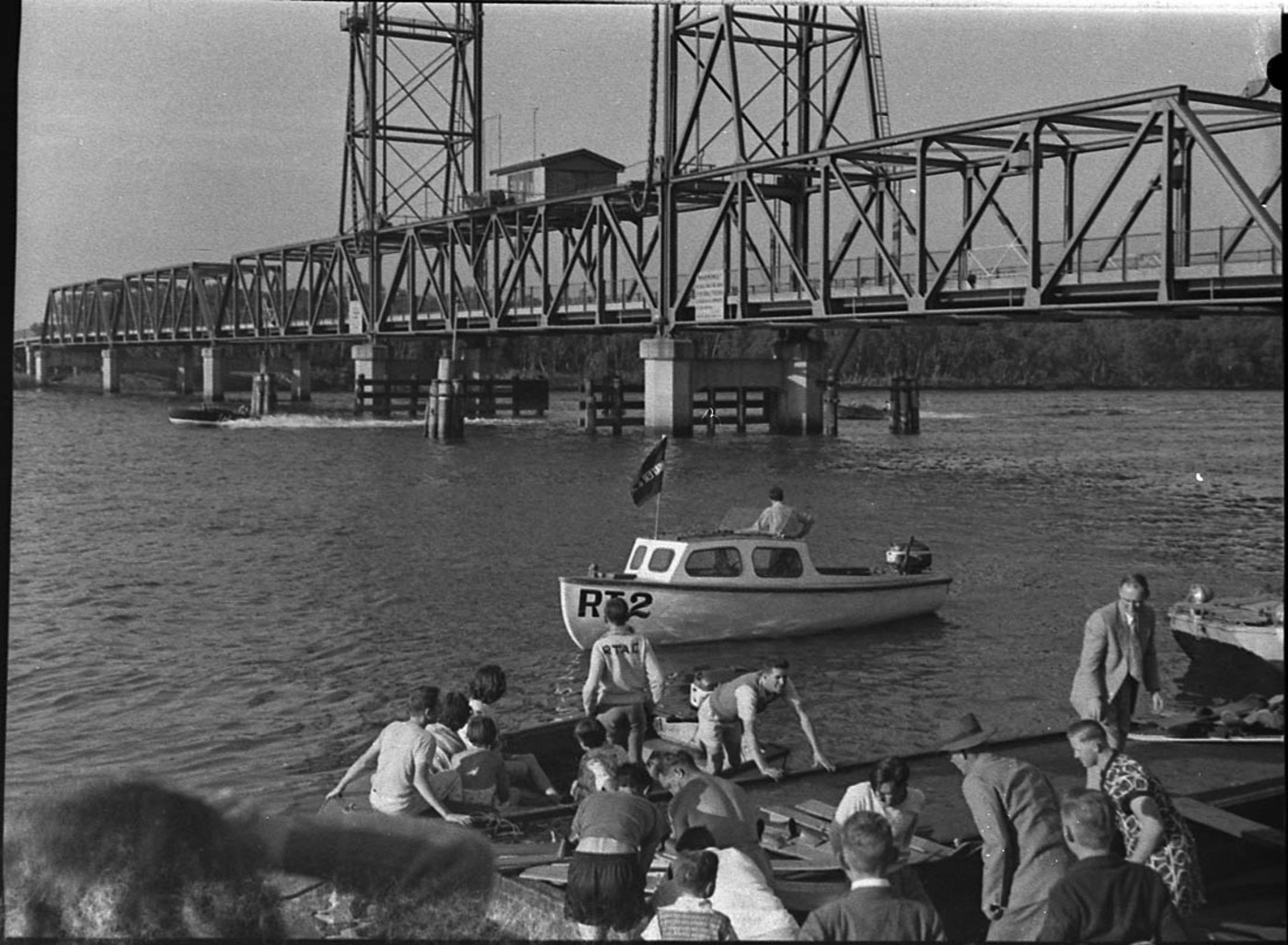
- First bridge in April 1957
- Coordinates: 32.8232°S 151.6855°E
- Carries: Pacific Highway
- Crosses: Hunter River
- Locale: Tarro, New South Wales
- Owner: Transport for NSW
- Followed by: Stockton Bridge

Characteristics
- No. of lanes: 4

History
- Opened: 17 December 1952; July 1987 (duplicated)

Location
- Interactive map of Hexham Bridge

The Hexham Bridge is a pair of road bridges that carry the Pacific Highway across the Hunter River from Tarro to Tomago in New South Wales, Australia. It comprises two separate structures; a steel truss bridge opened on the 17 December 1952 by Acting Minister of Transport George Weir and a concrete bridge opened in 1987.

== History ==
Prior to the construction of the bridge, the Department of Main Roads operated a car ferry to carry the Pacific Highway across the Hunter River. In November 1945, a contract was awarded to build a steel truss bridge with a central lifting span. However, due to a shortage of materials following World War II, it was not completed until December 1952.

A concrete high-level fixed bridge opened to the west of the original bridge in July 1987 to carry northbound traffic, with the original converted to carry southbound traffic only. Hexham Bridge will cease to be used by the Pacific Highway when a bypass opens in late-2026.
