= Tarro railway station =

Railway station in New South Wales, Australia

Tarro
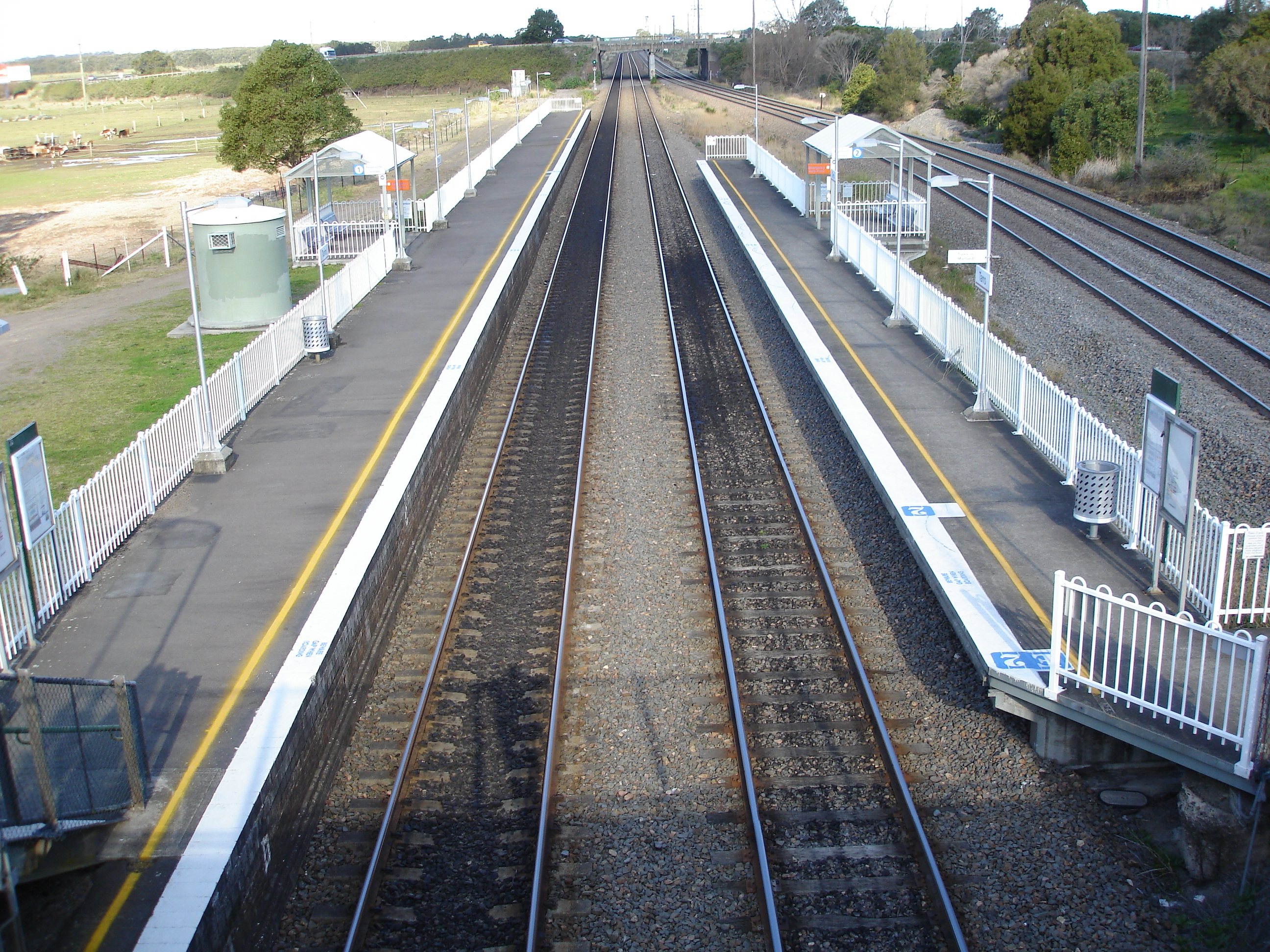
- Eastbound view of the station platforms, August 2006

General information
- Location: Woodberry Road, Tarro; Australia
- Coordinates: 32°48′33″S 151°40′11″E
- Owner: Transport Asset Manager of New South Wales
- Operator: Sydney Trains
- Line: Main Northern
- Distance: 178.18 kilometres (110.72 mi) from Central
- Platforms: 2 side
- Tracks: 4

Construction
- Structure type: Ground
- Accessible: No

Other information
- Station code: TRJ
- Website: Transport for NSW

History
- Opened: 1 August 1871; 155 years ago

Passengers
- 2025: 2,836 (year); 8 (daily) (Sydney Trains, NSW TrainLink)

Services
Preceding station	Intercity Trains	Following station
Beresfield towards Telarah or Scone	Hunter Line	Hexham towards Newcastle Interchange
Location

Tarro railway station is located on the Main Northern line in New South Wales, Australia. It serves the western Newcastle suburb of Tarro, opening on 1 August 1871.

== Platforms and services ==
Tarro has two side platforms. It is serviced by Sydney Trains Intercity Hunter Line services travelling between Newcastle, Maitland and Telarah. It is also service by one early morning service to Scone.

Platform	Line	Stopping pattern	Notes
1	HUN	services to Newcastle	
2	HUN	services to Maitland & Telarah	1 early morning service to Scone

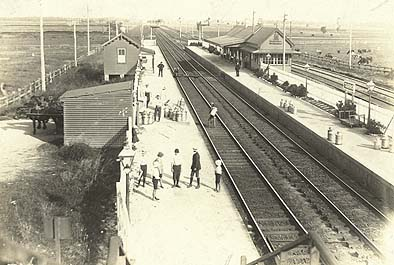
The station c.1915
