= Hexham railway station, New South Wales =

Railway station in New South Wales, Australia

Hexham
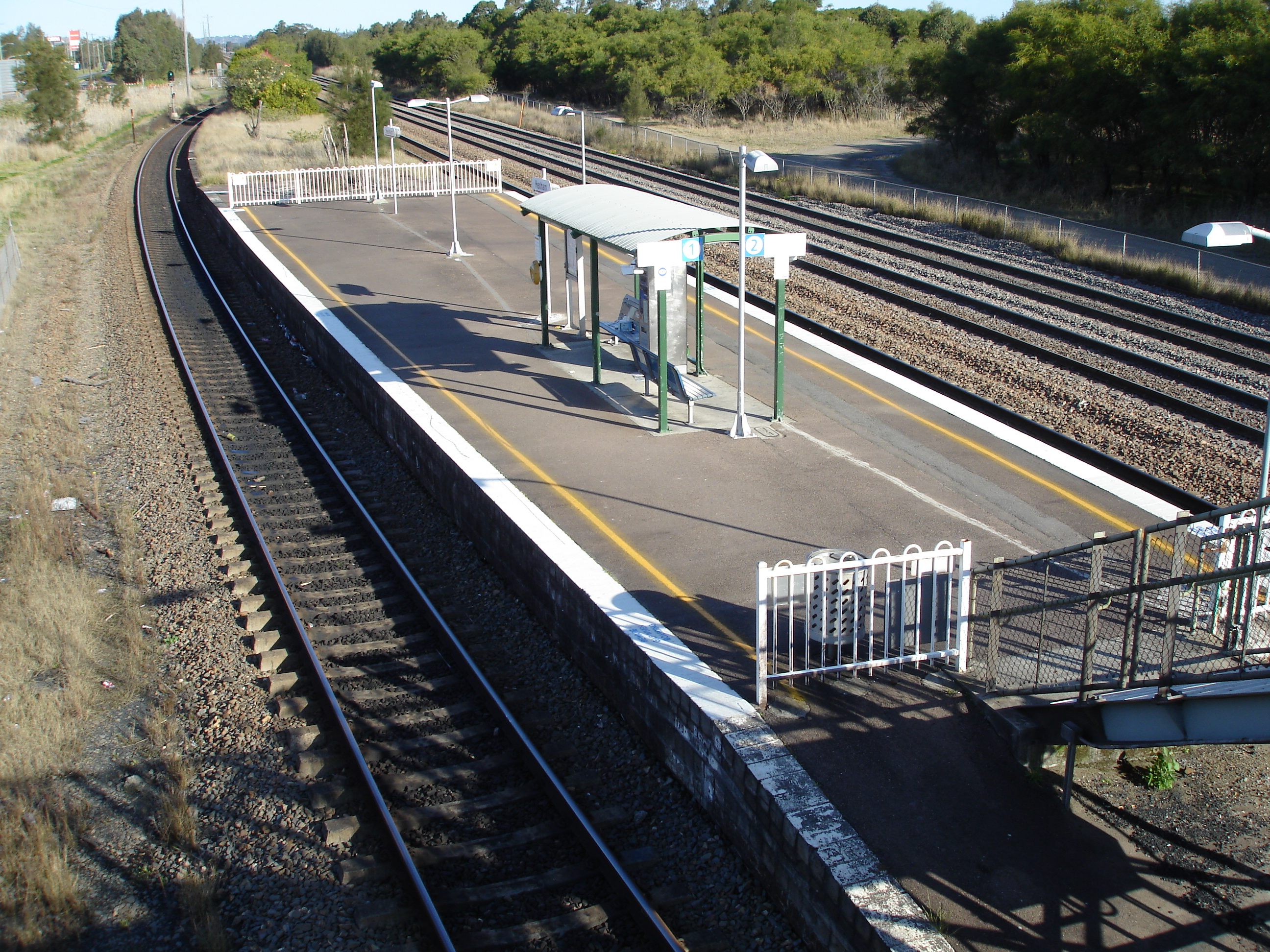
- Eastbound view of the station platforms, August 2006

General information
- Location: Pacific Highway, Hexham; Australia
- Coordinates: 32°49′45″S 151°41′03″E
- Owner: Transport Asset Manager of New South Wales
- Operator: Sydney Trains
- Line: Main Northern
- Distance: 175.53 kilometres (109.07 mi) from Central
- Platforms: 2 (1 island)
- Tracks: 4

Construction
- Structure type: Ground
- Accessible: No

Other information
- Station code: HXM
- Website: Transport for NSW

History
- Opened: 1 August 1871; 155 years ago
- Rebuilt: 1990s

Passengers
- 2025: 4,437 (year); 12 (daily) (Sydney Trains, NSW TrainLink)

Services
Preceding station	Intercity Trains	Following station
Tarro towards Telarah or Scone	Hunter Line	Sandgate towards Newcastle Interchange
Location

Hexham railway station is located on the Main Northern line in New South Wales, Australia. It serves the western Newcastle suburb of Hexham, and was opened on 1 August 1871.

The station has a full-length island platform; however, the eastern end has been fenced off to a shorter two carriage train length. South of the coal road, Aurizon have a locomotive depot.

== History ==
Hexham originally had a substantial brick platform building; however, this was demolished in May 1993 and replaced with a lightweight bus-shelter type structure.

Until 1987, the Richmond Vale's exchange sidings were located opposite Hexham station.

In November 2014, the Australian Rail Track Corporation completed a project that saw the westbound coal road relocated further south to make way for five 1,800 metre passing loops.

== Platforms and services ==
Hexham has one island platform with two faces. It is serviced by Sydney Trains Hunter Line services travelling between Newcastle, Maitland and Telarah. It is also serviced by one early morning service to Scone.

Platform	Line	Stopping pattern	Notes
1	HUN	services to Newcastle	
2	HUN	services to Maitland & Telarah	1 early morning service to Scone
