= Tomago =

Suburb in New South Wales, Australia

- Suburb
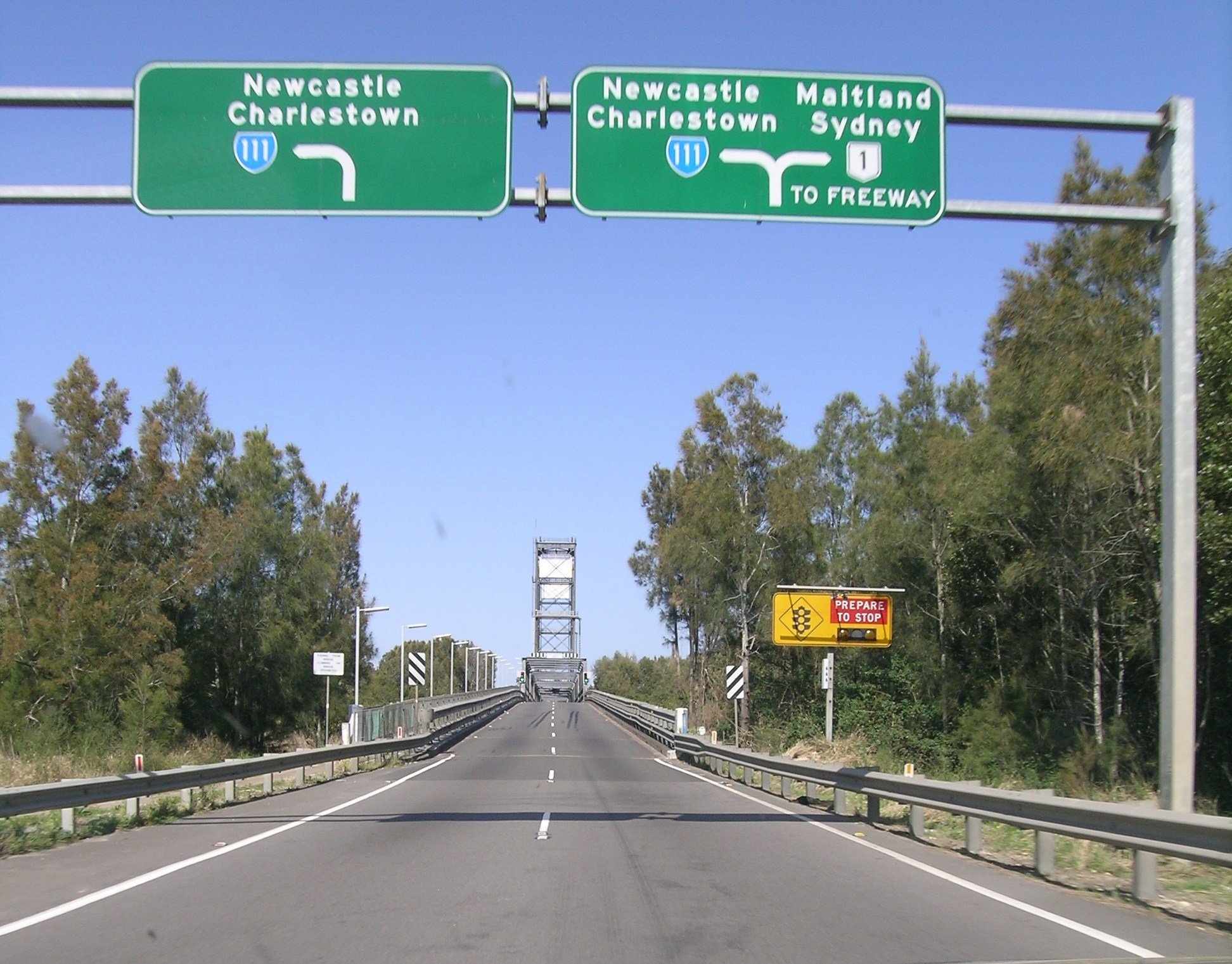
- Hexham Bridge connects Tomago to Hexham

- Interactive map of Tomago
- Coordinates: 32°49′48″S 151°43′15″E
- Country: Australia
- State: New South Wales
- Region: Hunter
- LGA: Port Stephens Council
- Location: 164 km (102 mi) N of Sydney; 20 km (12 mi) NW of Newcastle; 8 km (5.0 mi) S of Raymond Terrace

Government
  - State electorate: Port Stephens
  - Federal division: Paterson

Area (Note: Area calculation is based on 1:100000 map 9232 NEWCASTLE.)
  - Total: 38.1 km^{2} (14.7 sq mi)
- Elevation (Note: Average elevation of the suburb as shown on 1:100000 map 9232 NEWCASTLE.): 3 m (9.8 ft)

Population
  - Total: 277 (2016 census)
  - Density: 7.1/km^{2} (18/sq mi)
- Time zone: UTC+10 (AEST)
  - Summer (DST): UTC+11 (AEDT)
- Postcode: 2322
- County: Gloucester
- Parish: Stockton
- Mean max temp: 27.9 °C (82.2 °F)
- Mean min temp: 6.4 °C (43.5 °F)
- Annual rainfall: 1,125.6 mm (44.31 in)
Suburbs around Tomago
Tarro	Heatherbrae, Raymond Terrace	Williamtown
Tarro	Tomago	Williamtown, Fullerton Cove
Hexham	Hexham, Kooragang	Kooragang

Tomago is a combined industrial/semi-rural suburb of the Port Stephens local government area in the Hunter Region of New South Wales, Australia. It is located just north of the Hunter River and west of the body of water known as Fullerton Cove. Tomago means "sweet water" in the local Aboriginal language. In 2016 277 lived in Tomago with a median age of 55, 72.7% born in Australia and 80.4% only speaking English at home.

== Geography ==
Tomago is primarily flat with sandy soil and is surrounded on three sides by water. The Hunter River flows around the western and southern borders of the suburb. To the east is Fullerton Cove. There is no direct access to the land portion of the neighbouring suburbs of Tarro, Kooragang or Fullerton Cove. Access to and from Hexham is only possible via the Hexham bridges, which are actually located in the suburb of Tarro.

== Industry ==
Major industrial sites in the area are the Tomago aluminium smelter, Forgacs Shipyard, and the Tomago Sandbeds water treatment works. Until 1999, ABB Engineering Construction manufactured coal wagons for the Hunter Valley Coal Chain. In 2009 Volgren opened a factory to body buses, it closed in 2012.

== Hunter Region Botanic Gardens ==
The Hunter Region Botanic Gardens are adjacent to the eastern side of the Pacific Highway in the north of the suburb. The gardens cover an area of 140 ha (346 acres), including 30 ha (74 acres) of themed parks and 105 ha (259 acres) of natural bushland.

== Tomago House ==
Tomago House and its nearby chapel are heritage listed buildings on Tomago Road, the main road through the suburb, which provides access from the Pacific Highway to Newcastle Airport. The chapel is approximately 250 m (820 ft) to the west of Tomago House on a different block of land.
