= List of suburbs in Greater Newcastle, New South Wales =

Below is a list of suburbs located within the Greater Newcastle region in New South Wales, Australia. This region (officially the Newcastle statistical subdivision) comprises the local government areas (LGAs) of City of Newcastle, City of Lake Macquarie, City of Cessnock, City of Maitland and Port Stephens Council. Suburbs in Italics are either former suburbs or locality names. Newcastle currently has 47 residential suburbs and Lake Macquarie has 96.

The 2021 Australian Census recorded the Newcastle Greater Metropolitan area as having a population of 682,465. (Note: There is no single source that states the population accurately. The figure of 611,400 is an average approximation, based on the combined populations of all LGAs at the 2016 census and the 2018 Australian Bureau of Statistics estimates for all LGAs as taken from the individual LGA articles.)

== City of Newcastle suburbs ==
- Adamstown
- Adamstown Heights (Note: Shared with City of Lake Macquarie)
- Bar Beach
- Belair
- Beresfield
- Birmingham Gardens
- Black Hill
- Broadmeadow
- Callaghan (University)
- Carrington
- Cooks Hill
- Elermore Vale
- Fletcher
- Georgetown
- Glendore
- Hamilton
- Hamilton East
- Hamilton North
- Hamilton South
- Heaton
- Hexham
- The Hill
- Islington
- Jesmond
- The Junction
- Kooragang
- Kooragang Berths
- Kotara
- Kotara East
- Kotara Fair
- Kotara Heights
- Lambton
- Lambton Gardens
- Lenaghan
- Maryland
- Maryville
- Mayfield
- Mayfield Berths
- Mayfield East
- Mayfield North
- Mayfield West
- Merewether
- Merewether Heights
- Minmi
- Newcastle
- Newcastle East
- Newcastle West
- New Lambton
- New Lambton Heights
- New Lambton South
- North Lambton
- Plattsburg
- Rankin Park
- Sandgate
- Shortland
- South Newcastle
- Stockton
- Tarro
- Tighes Hill
- Wallsend
- Wallsend East
- Wallsend South
- Warabrook
- Waratah
- Waratah West
- Wickham

== City of Lake Macquarie suburbs ==
- Adamstown (Note: Shared with City of Newcastle)
- Adamstown Heights
- Arcadia Vale
- Argenton
- Awaba
- Balcolyn
- Balmoral
- Barnsley
- Belmont
- Belmont North
- Belmont South
- Bennetts Green
- Blackalls Park
- Blacksmiths
- Bolton Point
- Bonnells Bay
- Boolaroo
- Booragul
- Brightwaters
- Buttaba
- Cameron Park
- Cams Wharf
- Cardiff
- Cardiff Heights
- Cardiff North
- Cardiff South
- Cardiff West
- Carey Bay
- Catherine Hill Bay
- Caves Beach
- Charlestown
- Charlestown East
- Charlestown South
- Coal Point
- Cooranbong
- Crangan Bay (Note: Shared with Central Coast Council)
- Croudace Bay
- Dora Creek
- Dudley
- Edgeworth
- Edgeworth Heights
- Eleebana
- Elermore Vale
- Eraring
- Fassifern
- Fennell Bay
- Fishing Point
- Floraville
- Freemans Waterhole
- Garden Suburb
- Gateshead
- Gateshead West
- Glendale
- Glendale East
- Highfields
- Hillsborough (South)
- Holmesville
- Jewells
- Kahibah
- Kilaben Bay
- Killingworth
- Kotara
- Kotara Heights
- Kotara South
- Lakelands
- Little Pelican
- Macquarie Hills
- Mandalong
- Marks Point
- Marmong Point
- Martinsville
- Middle Camp
- Mirrabooka
- Moonee
- Morisset
- Morisset Park
- Mount Hutton
- Murrays Beach
- Myuna Bay
- Newcastle Heights
- New Lambton
- New Lambton Heights
- Nords Wharf
- Pelican
- Pinny Beach
- Rankin Park
- Rathmines
- Redhead
- Ryhope
- Seahampton (Note: Shared with City of Maitland)
- Silverwater
- Speers Point
- Sunshine
- Swansea
- Swansea Heads
- Teralba
- Tingira Heights
- Toronto
- Valentine
- Wakefield
- Wangi Wangi
- Warners Bay
- Wallsend
- West Wallsend
- Whitebridge
- Windale
- Windermere Park
- Woodrising
- Wyee
- Wyee Point
- Yarrawonga Park

== City of Cessnock suburbs ==
- Cessnock
- Cessnock West
- Aberdare
- Abermain
- Abernethy
- Allandale
- Bellbird
- Bellbird Heights
- Big Yengo
- Bishops Bridge
- Black Hill (Note: Shared with City of Newcastle and City of Maitland)
- Boree
- Branxton (Note: Shared with Singleton Council)
- Brunkerville
- Buchanan
- Buttai
- Cedar Creek
- Cliftleigh
- Congewai
- East Branxton
- Ellalong
- Elrington
- Greta
- Greta Main
- Heddon Greta
- Kearsley
- Keinbah
- Kitchener
- Kurri Kurri
- Laguna
- Lovedale
- Loxford
- Millfield
- Moruben
- Mount View
- Mount Vincent
- Mulbring
- Neath
- North Rothbury
- Nulkaba
- Paxton
- Paynes Crossing
- Pelaw Main
- Pelton
- Pokolbin
- Quorrobolong
- Richmond Main
- Richmond Vale
- Rothbury
- Sawyers Gully
- Stanford Merthyr
- Stockrington
- Sweetmans Creek
- Weston
- Wollombi

== City of Maitland suburbs ==
- Maitland
- East Maitland
- South Maitland
- Maitland North
- Aberglasslyn
- Allandale (Note: Shared with City of Cessnock)
- Anambah
- Ashtonfield
- Beresfield
- Berry Park
- Bishops Bridge
- Black Hill (Note: Shared with City of Newcastle and City of Cessnock)
- Bolwarra
- Bolwarra Heights
- Buchanan
- Chisholm
- Duckenfield
- Farley
- Gillieston Heights
- Gosforth
- Green Hills
- Greta
- Harpers Hill
- Hillsborough
- Horseshoe Bend
- Lambs Valley
- Largs
- Lenaghan
- Lochinvar
- Lorn
- Louth Park
- Luskintyre
- Maitland Vale
- Melville
- Metford
- Millers Forest
- Mindaribba
- Morpeth
- Mount Dee
- Oakhampton
- Oakhampton Heights
- Oswald
- Paterson (Note: Shared with Dungog Shire)
- Phoenix Park
- Pitnacree
- Raworth
- Rosebrook
- Rutherford
- Seahampton
- Summer Hill
- Tarro
- Telarah
- Tenambit
- Thornton
- Tocal
- Windella
- Windermere
- Woodberry
- Woodville (Note: Shared with Port Stephens Council)

== Port Stephens Council suburbs ==
- Anna Bay
- Balickera
- Boat Harbour
- Bobs Farm
- Brandy Hill
- Butterwick
- Campvale
- Corlette
- Duns Creek
- Eagleton
- East Seaham
- Fern Bay
- Ferodale
- Fingal Bay
- Fishermans Bay
- Fullerton Cove
- Glen Oak
- Heatherbrae
- Hinton
- Karuah (Note: Shared with Mid-Coast Council)
- Kings Hill
- Lemon Tree Passage
- Mallabula
- Medowie
- Nelson Bay
- Nelsons Plains
- One Mile
- Osterley
- Oyster Cove
- Raymond Terrace
- Salamander Bay
- Salt Ash
- Seaham
- Shoal Bay
- Soldiers Point
- Swan Bay
- Tanilba Bay
- Taylors Beach
- Tomago
- Twelve Mile Creek
- Wallalong
- Williamtown
- Woodville
