= Luskintyre =

- Town
- Coordinates: 32°39′54″S 151°25′4″E
- Country: Australia
- State: New South Wales
- LGA: City of Maitland

Government
  - State electorate: Maitland
  - Federal division: Lyne

Population
  - Total: 216 (2021 census)
- Postcode: 2321
Localities around Luskintyre
Lambs Valley	Gosforth, Tocal
Luskintyre	Windermere, Hillsborough
Lochinvar, Harpers Hill, Oswald, Greta	Windella, Anambah

Luskintyre is a small rural area in the Hunter Region of New South Wales. It is off the New England Highway near Lochinvar. Luskintyre stretches over 15 kilometres between Lochinvar and Lambs Valley. The Luskintyre bridge was used in the filming of the popular film "Tomorrow, When the War Began". The Luskintyre Aviation Flying Museum operates a private airfield in the area used for the restoration of vintage aeroplanes.

== Demographics ==
As of the 2021 Australian census, 216 people resided in Luskintyre, up from 183 in the 2016 census. The median age of persons in Luskintyre was 40 years. There were more males than females, with 51.6% of the population male and 48.4% female. The average household size was 3.2 people per household.

== Luskintyre Airfield and Aviation Museum ==
Established in 1977 which a 228-acre privately owned airfield. It main goal is to preserve vintage aircraft particularly the De-Havilland DH -82A Tiger Moth. Every two months there is an open weekend who owners host a lunch and fly their tiger moths.
