= Windella =

- Suburb
- Coordinates: 32°41′56″S 151°28′50″E
- Country: Australia
- State: New South Wales
- Region: Hunter
- City: Maitland
- LGA: City of Maitland
- Location: 176 km (109 mi) N of Sydney; 44 km (27 mi) NW of Newcastle; 10 km (6.2 mi) NW of Maitland

Government
  - State electorate: Maitland
  - Federal division: Hunter

Population
  - Total: 595 (2011 census)
- Postcode: 2320
Suburbs around Windella
Windermere	Anambah	Melville
Lochinvar	Windella	Rutherford
	Farley	Rutherford

Windella is a suburb in the City of Maitland in the Hunter Region of New South Wales, Australia. It is a growing residential area located immediately north of the New England Highway and adjacent to Maitland Airport, halfway between Lochinvar and Rutherford. At the 2011 census, 595 people resided in Windella.
