= Oakhampton, New South Wales =

Oakhampton
- Suburb
- Interactive map of Oakhampton
- Coordinates: 32°41′54.3″S 151°33′04.1″E
- Country: Australia
- State: New South Wales
- Region: Hunter
- LGA: Maitland
- Location: 177 km (110 mi) NE of Sydney; 39 km (24 mi) NW of Newcastle; 4 km (2.5 mi) N of Maitland; 8 km (5.0 mi) S of Paterson

Government
  - State electorate: Maitland
  - Federal division: Paterson

Area
  - Total: 5.1 km^{2} (2.0 sq mi)
- Elevation: 5 to 20 m (16 to 66 ft)

Population
  - Total: 190 (2016 census)
  - Density: 37.3/km^{2} (96/sq mi)
- Time zone: UTC+10 (AEST)
  - Summer (DST): UTC+11 (AEDT)
- Postcode: 2320
- County: Northumberland
- Parish: Maitland
Suburbs around Oakhampton
Aberglasslyn	Maitland Vale	Bolwarra Heights
Oakhampton Heights	Oakhampton	Bolwarra
Rutherford	Maitland	Lorn

Oakhampton is a suburb in the City of Maitland in the Hunter Valley of New South Wales, Australia.

The traditional owners and custodians of the Maitland area are the Wonnarua people.

The railway station in the area closed on 20 October 1975. Hunter Line services operate through the closed station on the North Coast line located between Telerah and Mindaribba.
