= Telarah =

Coordinates: 32°43′39″S 151°32′08″E

- Suburb
- Country: Australia
- State: New South Wales
- Region: Hunter
- City: Maitland
- LGA: City of Maitland
- Location: 167 km (104 mi) N of Sydney; 38 km (24 mi) NW of Newcastle; 2 km (1.2 mi) NW of Maitland

Government
  - State electorate: Maitland
  - Federal division: Hunter

Population
  - Total: 2,318 (SAL 2021)
- Postcode: 2320
Suburbs around Telarah
| Rutherford | Rutherford | Oakhampton Heights |
| Farley | Telarah | Maitland |
| Farley | Mount Dee | South Maitland |

Telarah is a suburb in the City of Maitland, New South Wales, Australia. The suburb was formerly known as Homeville, however use of this name was abandoned in the 1950s. It is located on the New England Highway and is also the site of a major rail junction, where the North Coast line and the once extensive, privately owned South Maitland Railway system meet the Main North line. A station on the North Coast line opened in 1911 and is served by NSW TrainLink's Hunter Line, with services to Newcastle and Dungog. Telarah has its own fire brigade as well as bowling club, supermarket, pharmacy, takeaway shop and petrol station.

== History ==
The traditional owners and custodians of the Maitland area are the Wonnarua people.

== Heritage listings ==
Telarah has a number of heritage-listed sites, including:

- Junction Street: South Maitland Railway Workshops
