= Bishops Bridge, New South Wales =

Bishops Bridge
- Suburb
- Coordinates: 32°43′54″S 151°28′4″E
- Country: Australia
- State: New South Wales
- Region: Hunter
- City: Cessnock and Maitland
- LGAs: Maitland; Cessnock
- Location: 10.3 km (6.4 mi) WNW of Maitland; 16.3 km (10.1 mi) NE of Cessnock; 170 km (110 mi) N of Sydney

Government
  - State electorates: Cessnock; Maitland
  - Federal division: Paterson

Area
  - Total: 16.2125 km^{2} (6.2597 sq mi)

Population
  - Total: 218 (2021 census)
  - Density: 13.446/km^{2} (34.83/sq mi)
- Time zone: UTC+10 (AEST)
  - Summer (DST): UTC+11 (AEDT)
- Postcode: 2326
- County: Northumberland
- Parish: Gosforth
- Mean max temp: 24.2 °C (75.6 °F)
- Mean min temp: 10.5 °C (50.9 °F)
- Annual rainfall: 743.3 mm (29.26 in)
Suburbs around Bishops Bridge
Lochinvar	Farley	Farley
Allandale	Bishops Bridge	Gillieston Heights
Keinbah	Sawyers Gully	Gillieston Heights

Bishops Bridge is a locality in the cities of Cessnock and Maitland in the Hunter Region of New South Wales, Australia. At the 2021 Census, the population was 218, the median age was 43 and 92% born in Australia.
