= Rosebrook, New South Wales =

Rosebrook
- Suburb
- Interactive map of Rosebrook
- Coordinates: 32°38′54.3″S 151°30′04.1″E
- Country: Australia
- State: New South Wales
- Region: Hunter
- LGA: Maitland
- Location: 186 km (116 mi) NE of Sydney; 47 km (29 mi) NW of Newcastle; 13 km (8.1 mi) NNE of Maitland; 40 km (25 mi) E of Singleton

Government
  - State electorate: Maitland
  - Federal division: Lyne

Area
  - Total: 20.4 km^{2} (7.9 sq mi)
- Elevation: 10 to 256 m (33 to 840 ft)

Population
  - Total: 76 (2016 census)
  - Density: 3.73/km^{2} (9.65/sq mi)
- Time zone: UTC+10 (AEST)
  - Summer (DST): UTC+11 (AEDT)
- Postcode: 2320
- County: Durham
- Parish: Middlehope
Suburbs around Rosebrook
Webbers Creek	Tocal	Tocal
Hillsborough, Gosforth	Rosebrook	Mindaribba
Anambah	Melville	Maitland Vale

Rosebrook is a locality in the City of Maitland in the Hunter Region of New South Wales, Australia.
