= Maitland Vale =

- Suburb
- Interactive map of Maitland Vale
- Coordinates: 32°39′54.3″S 151°33′04.3″E
- Country: Australia
- State: New South Wales
- Region: Hunter
- LGA: Maitland
- Location: 181 km (112 mi) NE of Sydney; 43 km (27 mi) NW of Newcastle; 14 km (8.7 mi) N of Maitland; 18 km (11 mi) S of Paterson

Government
  - State electorate: Maitland
  - Federal division: Lyne

Area
  - Total: 11.3 km^{2} (4.4 sq mi)
- Elevation: 10 to 126 m (33 to 413 ft)

Population
  - Total: 135 (2016 census)
  - Density: 11.95/km^{2} (30.94/sq mi)
- Time zone: UTC+10 (AEST)
  - Summer (DST): UTC+11 (AEDT)
- Postcode: 2320
- County: Durham
- Parish: Middlehope
Suburbs around Maitland Vale
Rosebrook	Mindaribba	Mindaribba
Melville	Maitland Vale	Bolwarra Heights
Aberglasslyn	Oakhampton	Bolwarra Heights

Maitland Vale is a suburb in the City of Maitland in the Hunter Region of New South Wales, Australia.

The traditional owners and custodians of the Maitland area are the Wonnarua people.

Maitland Vale is a predominantly rural suburb and covers an area of 11.3 square kilometres (4.4 sq mi) with a new residential development in the southeastern corner comprising 20.5 hectares (51 acres). The Hunter River is located along the southern boundary, with the North Coast railway line along the eastern boundary.

The suburb is situated in a valley with hills rising in the west, north and east. Maitland Vale has a minimum elevation of 10 metres (33 ft) along the southern boundary rising to 126 metres (413 ft) in the north. Comerfords Hill is a prominent point in the southeast with a height of 84 metres (276 ft).
