= Largs, New South Wales =

Largs
- Suburb
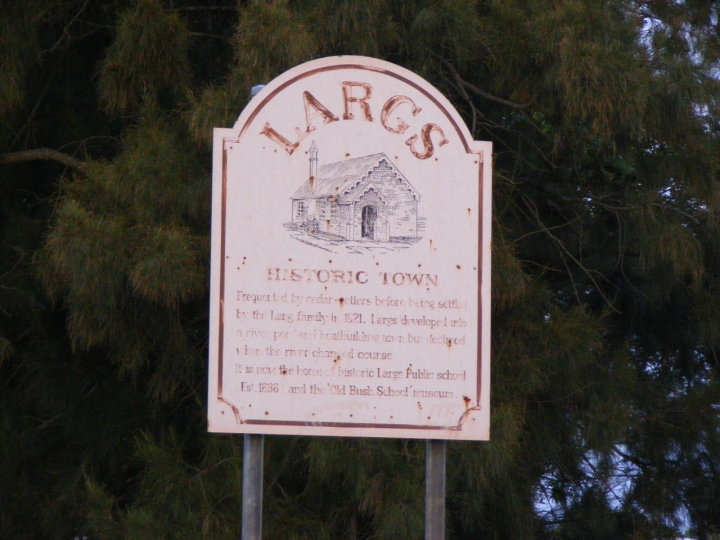
- The sign at the entry to the town of Largs

- Coordinates: 32°42′14.3″S 151°36′4.1″E
- Country: Australia
- State: New South Wales
- Region: Hunter
- LGA: Maitland City Council
- Location: 167.3 km (104.0 mi) N of Sydney; 37.1 km (23.1 mi) NW of Newcastle; 18.9 km (11.7 mi) WNW of Raymond Terrace; 6 km (3.7 mi) NNE of Maitland

Government
  - State electorate: Maitland
  - Federal division: Lyne
- Elevation: 3 to 40 m (9.8 to 131.2 ft)

Population
  - Total: 1,940 (2016 census)
- Time zone: UTC+10 (AEST)
  - Summer (DST): UTC+11 (AEDT)
- Postcode: 2320
- County: Northumberland
- Parish: Maitland
- Mean max temp: 30 °C (86 °F)
- Mean min temp: 6.2 °C (43.2 °F)
- Annual rainfall: 934.2 mm (36.78 in)
Suburbs around Largs
Mindaribba	Woodville	Wallalong
Bolwarra Heights	Largs	Phoenix Park
Bolwarra	Raworth	Morpeth

Largs is a developing township adjacent to Bolwarra Heights and is a suburb in the City of Maitland in the Hunter Valley of New South Wales, Australia. It is located on the eastern side of the Hunter River, 6 km north of the Maitland CBD. As of 2018, the Maitland LGA is seeing new development along elevated areas adjacent to the river flood plain. Maitland is an established city. Schools and all normal community facilities are available. The City of Maitland covers an area of 390 square kilometres.

== Name ==
Largs was named in honour of Largs Ayrshire, Scotland, famous for the battle of Largs fought in 1263, and which secured the freedom and independence of Scotland against the invasion of the Norwegians.

== History ==
The traditional owners and custodians of the Maitland area are the Wonnarua people.

In the pioneering days, Largs was established by Cedar getters, before the Lang family settlement in 1821. Largs was industrially important, as it became a river port and boat-building town before the Hunter River changed course. Largs Public School, established in 1838, is the New South Wales public school that has operated for the longest continuous time from the same site and is one of the oldest still operating schools in Australia.

== Geography ==
Largs covers an area of 7.72 square kilometres (2.98 sq mi) and is predominantly located on the Hunter River and Paterson River floodplains with a minimum elevation of 3 metres (9.8 ft) rising to low hills in the west with a maximum height of 40 metres (130 ft).

Almost all (over 90%) of the original vegetation (pre-1760) has been cleared. The floodplains has been developed primarily for irrigation which includes grazing cattle, growing lucerne, vegetables and turf. The low hills in the west contain the town of Largs with mainly residential development and a small number of commercial buildings.

There are two distrinctive landscape groups in Largs. The first group is the Hunter landscape group (hu and hub) which are extensive alluvial plains on recent alluvium from the Hunter and Paterson Rivers. It slopes <1% and is made up of completely cleared tall open-forest and closed-forest. The second landscape group is the Bolwarra Heights group (bh) which are rolling low hills on Permian sediments, with slopes 5 to 20% and cleared tall open-forest.

Under the Köppen-Geiger classification, Largs has a humid subtropical climate (Cfa).

== Transport ==
Hunter Valley Buses operates one bus route through Largs:

- 185: Maitland to Gresford via Bolwarra, Woodville and Paterson
