= Melville, New South Wales =

Melville
- Suburb
- Interactive map of Melville
- Coordinates: 32°40′37.2″S 151°31′15.5″E
- Country: Australia
- State: New South Wales
- Region: Hunter
- LGA: Maitland
- Location: 183 km (114 mi) NE of Sydney; 44 km (27 mi) NW of Newcastle; 11 km (6.8 mi) N of Maitland; 44 km (27 mi) E of Singleton

Government
  - State electorate: Maitland
  - Federal division: Lyne

Area
  - Total: 5.6 km^{2} (2.2 sq mi)
- Elevation: 10 to 182 m (33 to 597 ft)

Population
  - Total: 64 (2016 census)
  - Density: 11.43/km^{2} (29.6/sq mi)
- Time zone: UTC+10 (AEST)
  - Summer (DST): UTC+11 (AEDT)
- Postcode: 2320
- County: Durham
- Parish: Middlehope
Suburbs around Melville
| Rosebrook | Rosebrook | Rosebrook |
| Anambah | Melville | Maitland Vale |
| Anambah | Aberglasslyn | Aberglasslyn |

Melville is a locality in the City of Maitland in the Hunter Region of New South Wales, Australia.

Melville is a rural locality and covers an area of 5.6 square kilometres (2.2 sq mi). The Hunter River is located along the southern and western boundary rising to the Rosebrook Ridge at 182 metres (597 ft) located in the North.

The traditional owners and custodians of the Maitland area are the Wonnarua people.
