= Allandale, New South Wales =

Allandale
- Suburb
- Coordinates: 32°42′54″S 151°25′4″E
- Country: Australia
- State: New South Wales
- Region: Hunter
- City: Cessnock and Maitland
- LGA: Maitland
- Location: 15.2 km (9.4 mi) NNW of Maitland; 18.6 km (11.6 mi) NNE of Cessnock; 172 km (107 mi) N of Sydney
- Established: 1825

Government
  - State electorates: Cessnock; Maitland
  - Federal divisions: Hunter; Paterson

Area
  - Total: 10.4827 km^{2} (4.0474 sq mi)
- Elevation: 95 m (312 ft)

Population
  - Total: 68 (2021 census)
  - Density: 6.49/km^{2} (16.80/sq mi)
- Time zone: UTC+10 (AEST)
  - Summer (DST): UTC+11 (AEDT)
- Postcode: 2321
- County: Northumberland
- Parish: Branxton
- Gazetted: 30 July 1976 (locality)
- Mean max temp: 24.2 °C (75.6 °F)
- Mean min temp: 10.5 °C (50.9 °F)
- Annual rainfall: 743.3 mm (29.26 in)
Suburbs around Allandale
Greta	Harpers Hill	Oswald
Lovedale	Allandale	Lochinvar
Lovedale	Keinbah	Lochinvar

Allandale is a locality in Cessnock and Maitland in the Hunter Region of New South Wales, Australia. The traditional owners and custodians of the Maitland area are the Wonnarua people.

== History ==
A large land grant of 1,000 acres (405 ha) was allocated to Alexander Anderson in 1825, which he named "Allandale".
