= Bolwarra =

Bolwarra or Bolwarrah may refer to:

== Places in Australia ==
- Bolwarra, New South Wales
- Bolwarra Heights, New South Wales, a suburb of Maitland, New South Wales
- Bolwarra, Queensland, a locality in the Shire of Mareeba
- Bolwarra, Victoria, 8 km north of Portland, Victoria.
- Bolwarrah, Victoria

== Other ==
- Eupomatia laurina, a shrub originating from Australia and New Guinea, providing an Australian spice, also called ‘native guava’
