= Lorn, New South Wales =

Coordinates: 32°43′34″S 151°33′34″E

Lorn Maitland, New South Wales
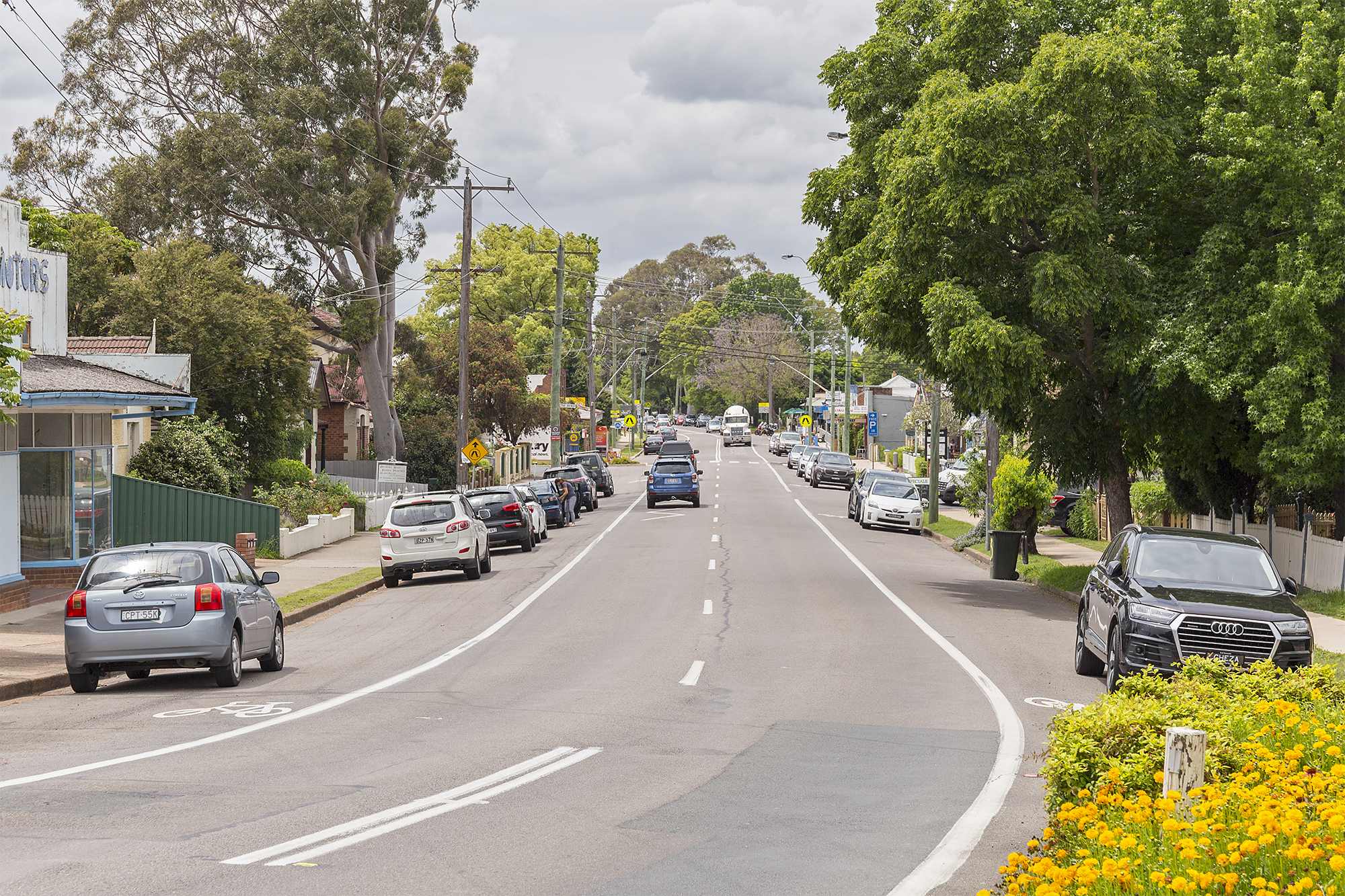
- Belmore Road in Lorn
- Population: 1,337 (2016 census)
- Postcode(s): 2320
- LGA(s): City of Maitland
Suburbs around Lorn:
Oakhampton	Bolwarra	Largs
Oakhampton	Lorn	Pitnacree
Maitland	Maitland	Horseshoe Bend

Lorn is a suburb of Maitland in New South Wales, Australia. It is located across the Hunter River from Maitland by the Belmore Bridge.

== Transport ==
Hunter Valley Buses operates one bus route through Lorn:

- 185: Maitland to Gresford via Bolwarra, Largs and Paterson
