= Aberglasslyn House =

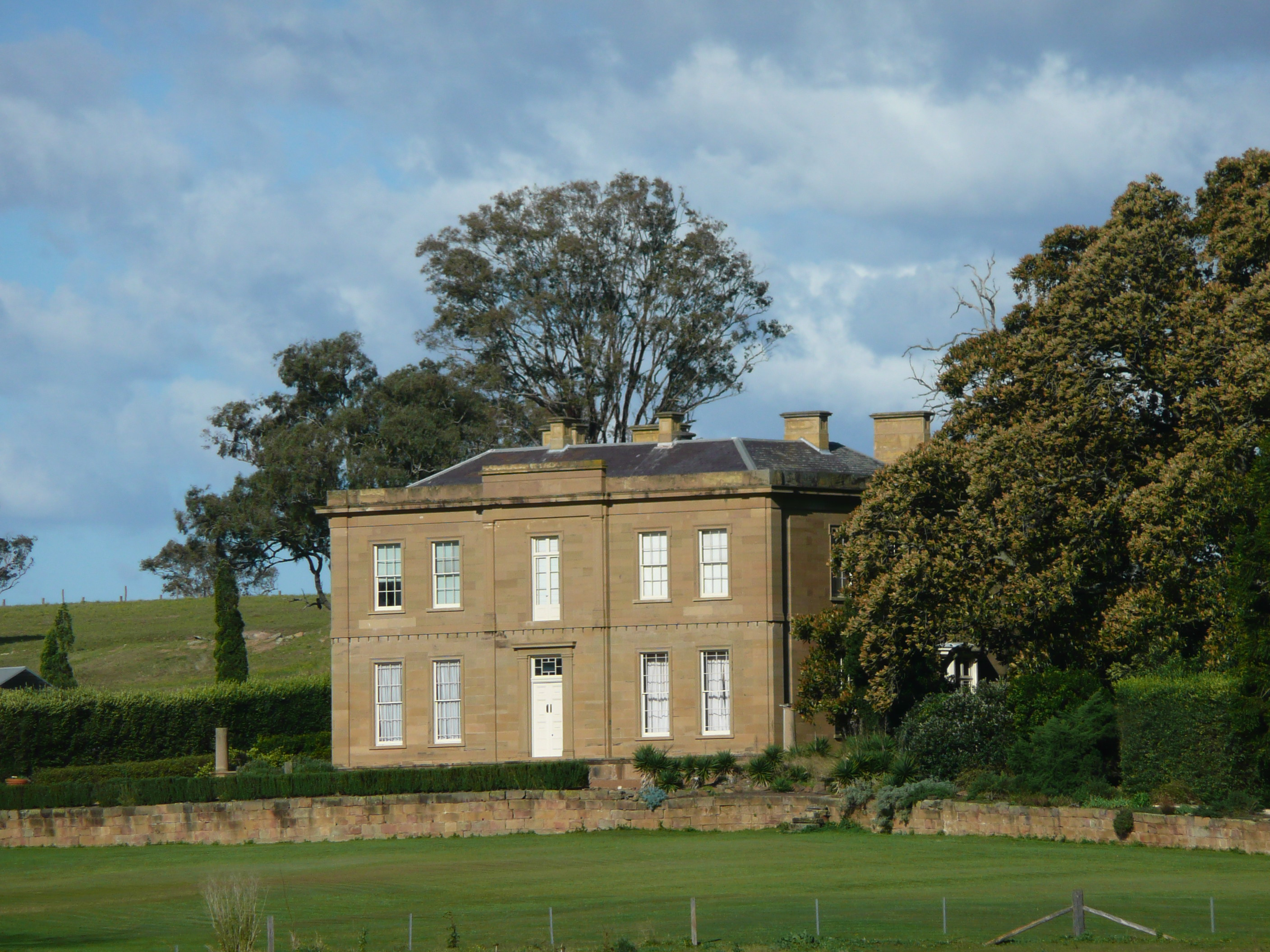
- Aberglasslyn House, 2009

- Location within New South Wales Location within Australia
- 32.6868°S 151.5407°E
- Location: Aberglasslyn Road, Aberglasslyn, City of Maitland, New South Wales, Australia

History
- Built: 1840–1842

Site notes
- Architect: John Verge
- Owner: Ken & Jill Dobler

New South Wales Heritage Register
- Official name: Aberglasslyn; Aberglasslyn Homestead
- Type: state heritage (built)
- Designated: 2 April 1999
- Reference no.: 195
- Type: House
- Category: Residential buildings (private)

Aberglasslyn House is a heritage-listed residence and former boarding school on Aberglasslyn lane, Aberglasslyn, in the Hunter region of New South Wales, Australia. It was designed by John Verge and built from 1840 to 1842. It is also known as Aberglasslyn and Aberglasslyn Homestead. It was added to the New South Wales State Heritage Register on 2 April 1999.

== History ==
On 3 July 1823 Henry D. Owens received a crown grant of 1100 acres in the Parish of Gosford. In 1824 Owen built a cedar and bluegum cottage on the property. In 1828 the estate and uncompleted house nearly 90 feet long was sold to Sir John Jameison. During the next eight years the estate was let to John Dow and during his occupation the name "Aberglasslyn" appeared. The property was also let to George Fletcher.

In 1835 George Hobler leased Aberglasslyn for a year from Sir John Jameison with an option to purchase. In July 1836 the land was purchased by George Hobler for 5,000 pounds.

The same year the architect Henry Robertson advertised for tenders for building a house on the estate. Construction did not commence until 1840 when Hobler recorded in his diary laying the foundation stone. It appears that during the delay Robertson was replaced as architect by John Bibb who had taken over the practice of John Verge in 1837. So closely does the house resemble Bibb and Verge's work in its planning and detailing that it is accepted that it is the work of the premier architect, John Verge.

Before Hobler could finish the house, he had fallen prey, as so many of his contemporaries had, to the financial depression of the early 1840s which devastated the colony. Hobler stopped work on the house in 1842, filed his "Insolvent Schedule" and was declared bankrupt. Hobler had completed the entrance hall, stair hall, drawing room and breakfast room. The rest of the house was left unfinished.

Hobler stayed on until 1845 although the estate was sold in 1843. In 1846 William Nicholson leased the estate and he bought it in 1853. He made the remainder of the house habitable at this time. This work appears to have been completed by 1858 when the house was leased to Walter Hall and his sisters as a boarding school. It continued in the Nicholson family until 1910, then passed through marriage to the McKeachie family.

In 1966 the McKeachie family sold the house, by then deteriorated, to Mr Jackson, a local plumber. In 1977 Jackson subdivided the land into four lots. The house and two of the lots were sold to Mr and Mrs Phillip Jones who undertook urgent and major conservation work.

Since 1983 the property has been under various ownerships.

== Description ==
This is an incomplete two storey early Victorian house overlooking a bend in the Hunter River. It is built of finely worked Ravensfield sandstone with a slate roof. It is a large rectangular house, drawing in plan from the compact form of the late 18th and early 19th century English neo-classical villas, with well proportioned rooms arranged around a central square hall containing a geometric staircase describing a circular wall beneath a hemispherical dome. Because of the disastrous financial depression of the early 1840s the house was not finished to the original plan - planned rear single storey wings containing offices were not built and only part of the interior detailing was completed. In the late 1850s most of the unfinished detailing was made good in a simple manner with mitered, moulded architraves instead of the elaborate aedicular forms of the original work. At this time two storied verandahs of cast iron columns on sandstone plinths were built instead of the single storey colonnade originally planned, for which sandstone columns had been quarried and moulded.

The workmanship of the first build and the materials used - in particular the Ravensfield stone and the cedar - are of the highest quality. The house retains in its wallpapers and paint finished, together with its services (bells, water closet and ballroom) remarkable evidence of both building, the effect of the financial depression and the taste of its builders.

Aberglasslyn is intimately sited close to the Hunter River. It commands extensive pastoral views and is a dramatic European monument set in isolation in an Antipodean landscape.

It was reported to be in good condition at the time of its heritage listing, with the property having medium archaeological potential.

== Heritage listing ==
It is arguably the finest extant Greek Revival style villa (in the 18th century sense of the word) in Australia. The configuration of its fabric, largely in its c. 1860 form, is patent physical evidence of the high expectations of colonial settlers of the 1830s and early 1840s and the severity of the economic crash of the 1840s. It is the earliest known surviving example in Australia of a house design generated in part by considerations of an integrated sanitary plumbing system. The building is one of a group of surviving pre-1850 in the vicinity of Maitland. The house and setting is physical evidence of the pattern of land settlement and leasehold farming in the Maitland area. It contains elements of high individual and often unique quality, including a domed stairwell and geometric stair of unique quality and design in Australia. The place is perceived by many knowledgeable people to be one of the major sites of cultural significance in Australia. On a regional basis the building is an historic landmark (monument). It is an exemplary example of the 19th century builder's art embodied in the quality of the stonework, brickwork, timber selection, carpentry and joinery, plasterwork, hardware etc.

Aberglasslyn was listed on the New South Wales State Heritage Register on 2 April 1999 having satisfied the following criteria.

The place is important in demonstrating the course, or pattern, of cultural or natural history in New South Wales.

It is arguably the finest extant Greek Revival style villa (in the 18th century sense of the word) in Australia. The configuration of its fabric, largely in its c. 1860 form is patent physical evidence of the high expectations of colonial settlers of the 1830s and early 1840s and the severity of the economic crash of the 1840s. It is the earliest known surviving example in Australia of a house design generated in part by considerations of an integrated sanitary plumbing system. The building is one of a group of surviving pre-1850 villas in the vicinity of Maitland. The house and setting are physical evidence of the pattern of land settlement and leasehold farming in the Maitland area.

The place is important in demonstrating aesthetic characteristics and/or a high degree of creative or technical achievement in New South Wales.

It contains elements of high individual and often unique quality, including a domed stairwell and geometric stairs of unique quality and design in Australia. It is one of a handful of pre-1850s villas in Australia designed integrally with a terrace wall, designed for a single-storey colonnade and planned around a central staircase in the Palladian manner of Taylor and Soane. The surrounding landscape is the setting for a building of great cultural significance.

The place has strong or special association with a particular community or cultural group in New South Wales for social, cultural or spiritual reasons.

The place is perceived by many knowledgeable people to be one of the major sites of cultural significance in Australia. On a regional basis the building is a historic landmark (monument). The place has provided and has the potential to continue to provide an educational function.

The place has potential to yield information that will contribute to an understanding of the cultural or natural history of New South Wales.

It is an exemplary example of the 19th century builder's art embodied in the quality of the stonework, brickwork, timber selection, carpentry and joinery, plasterwork, hardware etc. The construction of the stone geometric staircase is unique in Australia. The design and construction of the surviving section of the sanitary plumbing system is unique in Australia. The building is one of the best examples of the use of Ravensfield stone. The present incomplete state of the building provides a rare opportunity for the study of superior-quality 19th-century building techniques.

The place possesses uncommon, rare or endangered aspects of the cultural or natural history of New South Wales.

It is the earliest known surviving example in Australia of a house design generated in part by considerations of an integrated sanitary plumbing system.
