= Bolwarra Heights =

- Suburb
- Interactive map of Bolwarra Heights
- Coordinates: 32°42′00″S 151°35′05″E
- Country: Australia
- State: New South Wales
- Region: Hunter
- City: Maitland
- LGA: City of Maitland
- Location: 161 km (100 mi) N of Sydney; 31 km (19 mi) NW of Newcastle; 5 km (3.1 mi) NNE of Maitland

Government
  - State electorate: Maitland
  - Federal division: Lyne

Population
  - Total: 2,979 (2016 census)
- Postcode: 2320
Suburbs around Bolwarra Heights
Maitland Vale	Mindaribba	Woodville
Oakhampton	Bolwarra Heights	Largs
Bolwarra	Bolwarra	Largs

Bolwarra Heights is a suburb in the City of Maitland in the Hunter Valley of New South Wales, Australia. It is located on the eastern side of the Hunter River, approximately 5 km (3.1 mi) north of the Maitland central business district. Mainly a residential suburb, Bolwarra Heights is bordered to the east by Largs. The traditional owners and custodians of the Maitland area are the Wonnarua people.

The present day suburb of Bolwarra Heights is situated on land originally granted to Scottish settler George Lang by Lachlan Macquarie in 1822. The Lang family home, historic Dunmore House is a heritage-listed Georgian style homestead built using convict labour in the 1830s, located on the road between Bolwarra Heights and the nearby village of Woodville.

== Transport ==
Hunter Valley Buses operates one bus route through Bolwarra Heights:

- 185: Maitland to Gresford via Bolwarra, Largs and Paterson

The nearest railway station is Mindaribba.

== Heritage listings ==
Bolwarra Heights has a number of heritage-listed sites, including:

- 557 Paterson Road: Dunmore House
