= Horseshoe Bend, New South Wales =

Horseshoe Bend Maitland, New South Wales
- Coordinates: 32°44′03″S 151°33′50″E
- Population: 400 (2011 census)
- Postcode(s): 2320
- Location: 166 km (103 mi) N of Sydney; 34 km (21 mi) NW of Newcastle; 1 km (1 mi) E of Maitland
- LGA(s): City of Maitland
- Region: Hunter
- State electorate(s): Maitland
- Federal division(s): Hunter
Suburbs around Horseshoe Bend:
Maitland	Lorn	Lorn
Maitland	Horseshoe Bend	Pitnacree
Maitland	South Maitland	East Maitland

Horseshoe Bend is an inner city suburb in the City of Maitland in the Hunter Region of New South Wales, Australia. It is named for the shape made by the Hunter River flowing through the area as it was observed by early European settlers. It is sometimes colloquially referred to by residents as "The Bend".

== History ==
The traditional owners and custodians of the Maitland area are the Wonnarua people.

One of the earliest settled areas in Maitland, it is characterised by narrow streets and laneways, as well as a mixture of architectural styles spanning the 19th and 20th centuries. The suburb was amongst the worst affected areas in the 1955 Hunter Valley floods, with the loss of many homes, leading to a decline in its popularity as a residential area. Maitland City Council planning strategies have identified Horseshoe Bend as a future growth area, outlining flood mitigation measures and evacuation plans to protect residents.
