= Anambah House =

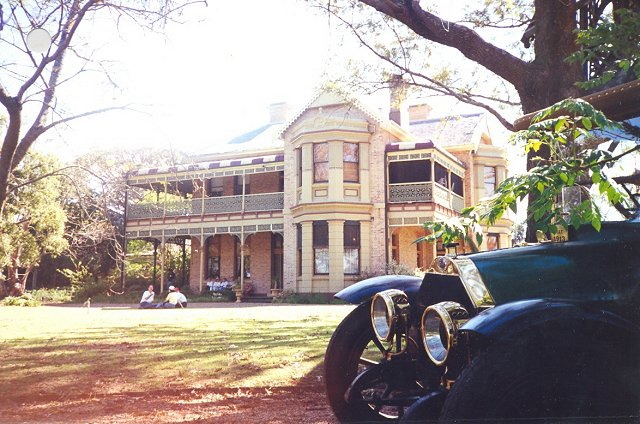

- Location within New South Wales Location within Australia
- 32.6894°S 151.5066°E
- Location: Anambah Road, Anambah, City of Maitland, New South Wales, Australia

History
- Built: 1889–1906

Site notes
- Architect: J.W Pender architect

New South Wales Heritage Register
- Official name: Anambah House
- Type: state heritage (built)
- Designated: 2 April 1999
- Reference no.: 275
- Type: House
- Category: Residential buildings (private)

Anambah House is a heritage-listed residence at Anambah Road, Anambah, a suburb of Maitland in the Hunter region of New South Wales, Australia. It was designed by J. W. Pender and built from 1889 to 1906. It was added to the New South Wales State Heritage Register on 2 April 1999.

== History ==
Anambah House was built in 1889 by the wealthy grazier J. K. Mackay for his son William. It was designed by architect J. W Pender of Maitland. Architectural drawings exist but they do not indicate a garden layout. This family is thought to have owned properties in Queensland which may have been the source of the bottle tree, often associated with droving, and the lacebark trees. Oral history sources suggest that cattle drives from Queensland properties terminated at the Anambah property before going to the Sydney markets. Early photos show the established carriage loop, formal garden beds filled with flowers set in the lawn and the tennis court. Over time the layout has become simplified. The courtyard garden was established by the present owners and the brick-edged carriage loop was re-surfaced during the filming of the movie "Country Life" in 1993. The tennis pavilion and a tree house were installed at this time.

The original grantee, George Cobb's daughter Mary, married Francis White of Edinglassie in 1853 and 4 of their children were born at Anambah (in the earlier house.) These children later established Belltrees at Scone. The Mackay family bought both Anambah & Minimbah (at Singleton) from the Cobbs in the 1870s and built both the present Anambah and Minimbah houses. They also owned Redleaf House in Woollahra (now Woollahra Council Chambers). The Mackay family are descendants of Duncan Forbes Mackay, Superintendent of Prisons and Public Works in Newcastle in 1827, who settled at Dungog. Various famous people have stayed in the house, including Dame Nellie Melba (c. 1908) & the Governors the Earl of Dudley and Lord Gowrie. In the 1950s Anambah was the home of Hal Lashwood, one of the greats of Australian radio, and during this period radio entertainers such as Roy Rene (Mo) & Jack Davey stayed in the house.

== Description ==
=== Homestead ===
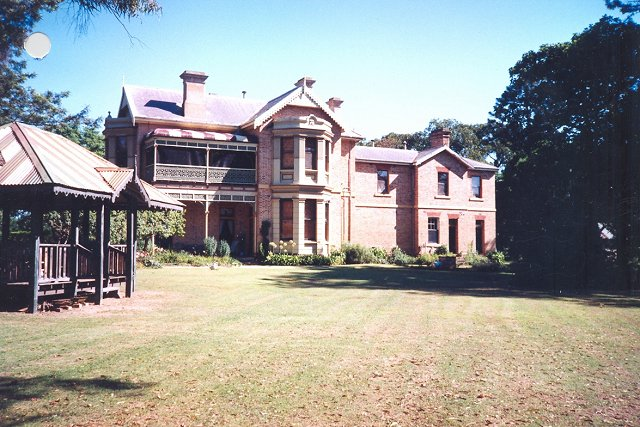
Homestead

A large two storey Victorian grazier's mansion of sandstock brick & hipped slate roof with two storey cast-iron verandahs on three sides, punctuated by two elaborately stuccoed bays. At the rear is a courtyard enclosed on 3 sides by the main house, kitchen wing and servants' rooms & on the 4th side by the later (1906) billiard room, also to Pender's design. The house is in a good state of preservation internally & features polished cedar joinery throughout including the staircase and large folding doors are filled with small stained-glass panels depicting birds & butterflies. There are also two large stained glass windows & on the stair landing. The plasterwork to arches & ceiling cornices is also in good condition & quite elaborate.

There are 2 pressed metal ceilings in upstairs bedrooms replacing earlier plaster ceilings & a pressed metal ceiling & dado in the billiard room. There are 10 fireplaces of pink, black, grey or white marble. All feature different tiles to hearths & grates. The brass, porcelain-tipped picture rails & several of the large brass curtain rods are still in position. The main entrance hallway & verandahs feature floors of encaustic tiles in geometric patterns. Electric servants bell-pushes are still in position in most main rooms, although the original bell-board has disappeared & some of the gas brackets are still intact from the time when the house had its own gas generating plant. The drawing room & dining rooms still have their original carpets although in somewhat worn condition. Externally the house is in good, if run-down, condition with original cast-iron lace all intact.

=== Gardens ===
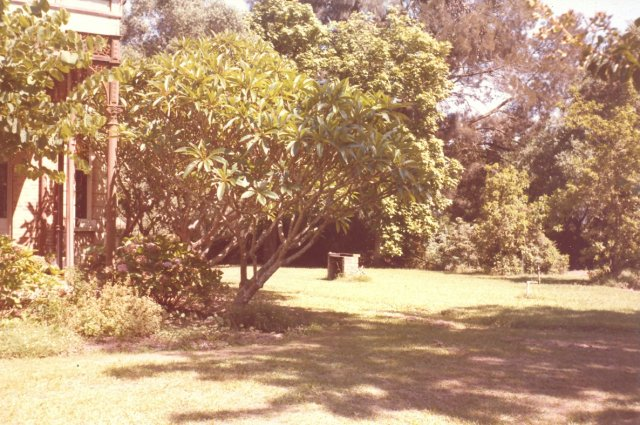
Gardens

Anambah House is set on a slight hill above a "lagoon" 5 km north west of central Maitland. Its mature araucaria pines and silky oaks (Grevillea robusta) make it a prominent element in the surrounding countryside which is generally cleared of tree vegetation. It is approached via a service drive which has been planted with pines, native trees and African olives. The southern side of the formal garden is fenced by a picket fence and Cape plumbago (P.capensis) and Cape honeysuckle/ tecoma (Tecomaria capensis) hedges. These are punctuated by wrought iron gates hung off elaborate gate posts which lead to the gravelled carriage loop which has brick edging an drains. The perimeter plantings of African olive, tecoma and silky oak enclose the garden to the east. A lawn tennis court with a recently built pavilion lies to the north of the house. The garden has a collection of Brachychiton trees which include kurrajong (B. populneus), Queensland lacebark (B. discolor), bottle tree (B. rupestris) and an unusual hybrid Brachychiton.

Design Elements

The front garden has a simplified late 19th century layout. It is defined by its enclosing hedges and is dominated by the carriage loop, mature silky oaks, jacarandas, araucarias and brachychitons. More recent additions are tallow trees (Sapium sebiferum) which are in the process of being pleached. To the rear of the house are of the house are mature figs, stone pines (Pinus pinea) and African olives. There is an intimate courtyard featuring palms and a fountain linking the kitchen area and billiard room and which acts as the informal entrance to the main house.

Perceptual Elements

Prominent views out of the garden are to the hills to the north. The overall feeling in the garden, however, is one of enclosure with a focus on the strong design of the house and carriage loop. The vertical lines of the araucaria pines complement the height of the house. Small intimate spaces are provided by the billiard room lawn garden, the courtyard and the tennis court area. The sense of a country grazier's property is evoked by the combination of plant material and there is a feeling of quiet retreat into a former era. (AHC)

The formal homestead garden is approached through wrought iron gates hung on elaborately stuccoed brick gate posts set in a timber picket fence. The driveway and paths within this area are brick edged & guttered & were originally gravelled although they are now overgrown. There is an overgrown lawn tennis court and many superb trees, including Bunya pines (Araucaria bidwillii), silky oaks (Grevillea robusta), jacarandas (J.mimosifolia), orchid trees (Bauhinia x variegata cv.s), frangipanis (Plumeria rubra cv.s) & a Queensland bottle tree. The garden was sheltered from the prevailing winds by windbreaks of native olives & hedges of "Orange Honeysuckle" (Cape honeysuckle/tecoma (Tecomaria capensis)). Outlines of formal beds can still be seen in what are now lawns. The house is set on a hill overlooking what is called the "lagoon". This is a picturesque small lake which is a habitat for the many water birds which frequent the area. The lagoon & the area between it and the house are considered very important to the house's setting.

=== Outbuildings ===
Stables

2 storey, sandstock brick stable block includes grooms quarters & hay loft over buggy room, harness room & horse boxes with original wood-blocked floors.

Barn

A typical rude timber farm building of the period, with slab sides & iron roof.

Garage & Dairy

Weatherboard structures important only as part of the homestead group.

Outhouses

Well constructed of sandstock brick. One for servants & one for family. Built over deep brick-arched pits. The family one is tiled to dado height and is a "2 seater".

=== Condition ===
The house is in a good state of preservation internally. The plasterwork to arches & ceiling cornices is also in good condition. The brass, porcelain-tipped picture rails & several of the large brass curtain rods are still in position. Electric servants bell-pushes are still in position in most main rooms, although the original bell-board has disappeared & some of the gas brackets are still intact from the time when the house had its own gas generating plant. The drawing room & dining rooms still have their original carpets although in somewhat worn condition. Externally the house is in good, if run-down, condition with original cast-iron lace all intact.

The garden is in good condition and elements such as the hedges have been progressively restored by the present owners. Its basic layout is intact although there has been a reduction in the number of perennial and annual beds.

== Heritage listing ==
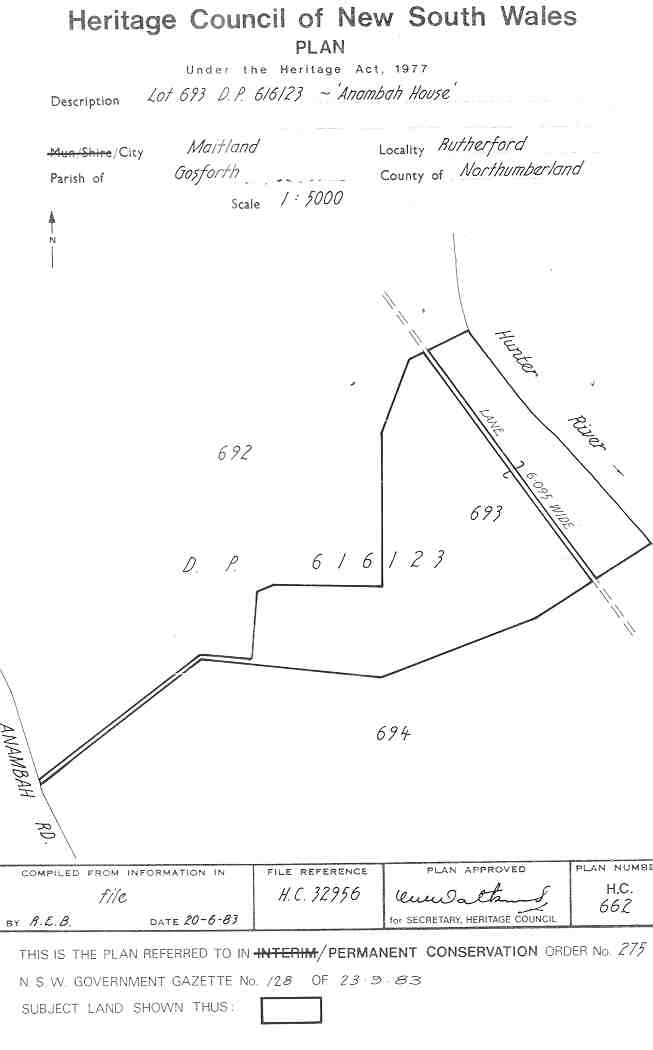
Heritage boundaries

Anambah House with its house, billiard room, stables and gardens form a complete and intact example of a prosperous late 19th century graziers homestead. It is an important relic of the great agricultural heritage of the lower Hunter, now passing into history with the onset of the resources boom. The house is also significant as a major example of the work of J. W. Pender, an important architect of the Hunter region.

Anambah House was listed on the New South Wales State Heritage Register on 2 April 1999.
