= Lenaghan, New South Wales =

Lenaghan
- Suburb
- Interactive map of Lenaghan
- Coordinates: 32°50′53″S 151°37′44″E
- Country: Australia
- State: New South Wales
- City: Newcastle
- LGAs: City of Newcastle; City of Maitland
- Location: 20 km (12 mi) WNW of Newcastle; 17 km (11 mi) SSE of Maitland

Government
  - State electorate: Cessnock
  - Federal division: Newcastle

Population
  - Total: 70 (SAL 2021)
- Postcode: 2322
- Parish: Hexham

Lenaghan is an outer northwestern suburb of Newcastle, New South Wales, Australia, located 20 kilometres (12 mi) from Newcastle's central business district. It is part of the City of Newcastle local government area.
