= Gosforth, New South Wales =

Coordinates: 32°38′55″S 151°29′05″E

Gosforth is a rural suburb of the Maitland City Council. Situated to the west of the Maitland township in the vicinity of Anambah, Aberglasslyn and Rutherford, Gosforth is surrounded by the Hunter River.

== Economy ==
Gosforth houses livestock and farming land and is close to many shopping precincts.

== Geology ==
"Grey billy" silcretes are found in Gosforth along the Hunter River.

== Recent developments ==
In 2025, minor flooding of the Hunter River resulted in a warning for Gosforth residents to "prepare to isolate".
