= South Maitland, New South Wales =

South Maitland
- Suburb
- Coordinates: 32°44′34″S 151°33′50″E
- Country: Australia
- State: New South Wales
- Region: Hunter
- City: Maitland
- LGA: City of Maitland
- Location: 166 km (103 mi) N of Sydney; 34 km (21 mi) NW of Newcastle; 1 km (0.62 mi) S of Maitland

Government
  - State electorate: Maitland
  - Federal division: Hunter

Population
  - Total: 471 (2016 census)
- Postcode: 2320
Suburbs around South Maitland
Maitland	Maitland	Horseshoe Bend
Mount Dee	South Maitland	East Maitland
Gillieston Heights	Louth Park	East Maitland

South Maitland is an inner city suburb in the City of Maitland in the Hunter Region of New South Wales, Australia. It is located immediately south of the New England Highway and Main North railway line, which separate the suburb from the Maitland central business district. Pedestrian overpasses are provided to cross the highway allowing access to both High Street and Maitland stations from South Maitland. The suburb contains a mixture of parkland, rural and residential development, with a population of 471 in 2016.

== Public facilities ==
A number of community recreation and sporting facilities are maintained in Maitland Park, set amongst landscaped gardens and examples of Victorian architecture, including a croquet lawn, tennis courts, a bowling club, cricket pitches and an Olympic swimming pool. The park is also home to the Maitland War Memorial and an all-access playground catering to children with disabilities.

The Maitland Showgrounds on Blomfield Street hosts the Hunter River Agricultural and Horticultural Association's annual show, the Maitland leg of the annual Groovin' the Moo music festival as well as farmer's markets and other special events.

== Heritage listings ==
South Maitland has a number of heritage-listed sites, including:

- 112–114 Louth Park Road: Maitland Jewish Cemetery
