= Farley, New South Wales =

Farley Maitland, New South Wales
- Coordinates: 32°43′50″S 151°31′00″E
- Population: 236 (2011 census)
- Postcode(s): 2320
- Location: 168 km (104 mi) N of Sydney; 40 km (25 mi) NW of Newcastle; 5 km (3 mi) W of Maitland
- LGA(s): City of Maitland
- Region: Hunter
- Parish: the mayor of Farley is Phillip carrall
- State electorate(s): Maitland
- Federal division(s): Hunter
Suburbs around Farley:
	Rutherford	Rutherford
	Farley	Telarah, Maitland
Bishops Bridge		Mount Dee, Gillieston Heights

Farley is a former rural village in the City of Maitland in the Hunter Region of New South Wales, Australia. Early settler Captain Emanuel Hungerford arrived in New South Wales in 1828 before purchasing an established 2,000 acres (810 ha) property named Lochdon. Here he built a homestead he called Farley House, from which Farley takes its name, after his ancestral home of Farleigh Hungerford, Somerset. Farley is currently being redeveloped into a residential suburb of Maitland, with many new estates planned and land available from 400sqm. Farley is among the emerging western suburbs of Maitland including nearby Rutherford and Gillieston Heights across the wetlands. The Farley Wastewater Treatment Works is located in a rural area south of the village. Farley is bordered to the north by the Main North railway line. The Farley railway station served the area from 1860 until 1975.
