= Bolwarra, New South Wales =

Bolwarra
- Suburb
- Interactive map of Bolwarra
- Coordinates: 32°44′54″S 151°33′54″E
- Country: Australia
- State: New South Wales
- Region: Hunter
- City: Maitland
- LGA: City of Maitland
- Location: 174.9 km (108.7 mi) N of Sydney; 37.4 km (23.2 mi) NW of Newcastle; 6.8 km (4.2 mi) NNE of Maitland

Government
  - State electorate: Maitland
  - Federal division: Lyne

Area
  - Total: 4.48 km^{2} (1.73 sq mi)
- Elevation: 3 to 38 m (9.8 to 124.7 ft)

Population
  - Total: 989 (2016 census)
  - Density: 220.8/km^{2} (571.8/sq mi)
- Postcode: 2320
- County: Northumberland
- Parish: Maitland
Suburbs around Bolwarra
	Bolwarra Heights
Oakhampton	Bolwarra	Largs
	Lorn

Bolwarra is a suburb in the City of Maitland in the Hunter Valley of New South Wales, Australia.

The traditional owners and custodians of the Maitland area are the Wonnarua people.

== Name ==
Bolwarra was named by John Brown, a native word meaning 'a flash of light', in 1822. P22. (`Dawn in the Valley` by WA Woods).

== Transport ==
Hunter Valley Buses operates one bus route through Bolwarra:

- 185: Maitland to Gresford via Largs, Woodville and Paterson
