= Mindaribba =

Locality in New South Wales, Australia

- Suburb
- Coordinates: 32.665°S 151.5844°E
- Country: Australia
- State: New South Wales
- LGA: City of Maitland

Government
  - State electorate: Upper Hunter
  - Federal division: Lyne

Population
  - Total: 97 (SAL 2021)
- Time zone: UTC+10 (AEST)
  - Summer (DST): UTC+11 (AEDT)
- Postcode: 2320
Suburbs around Mindaribba
Tocal	Tocal	Woodville
Rosebrook	Mindaribba	Woodville
Maitland Vale	Maitland Vale	Bolwarra Heights

Mindaribba is a suburb in the City of Maitland in the Hunter Valley of New South Wales, Australia. It is located on the eastern side of the Hunter River, approximately 9 km (5.6 mi) north of the Maitland central business district.

Mindaribba had a population of 97 people in the 2021 Census.

== Transport ==
Mindaribba railway station is located on the North Coast line, Australia. It is served by NSW TrainLink Hunter Line services travelling between Newcastle and Dungog.
