= Woodville, New South Wales =

Woodville
- Suburb
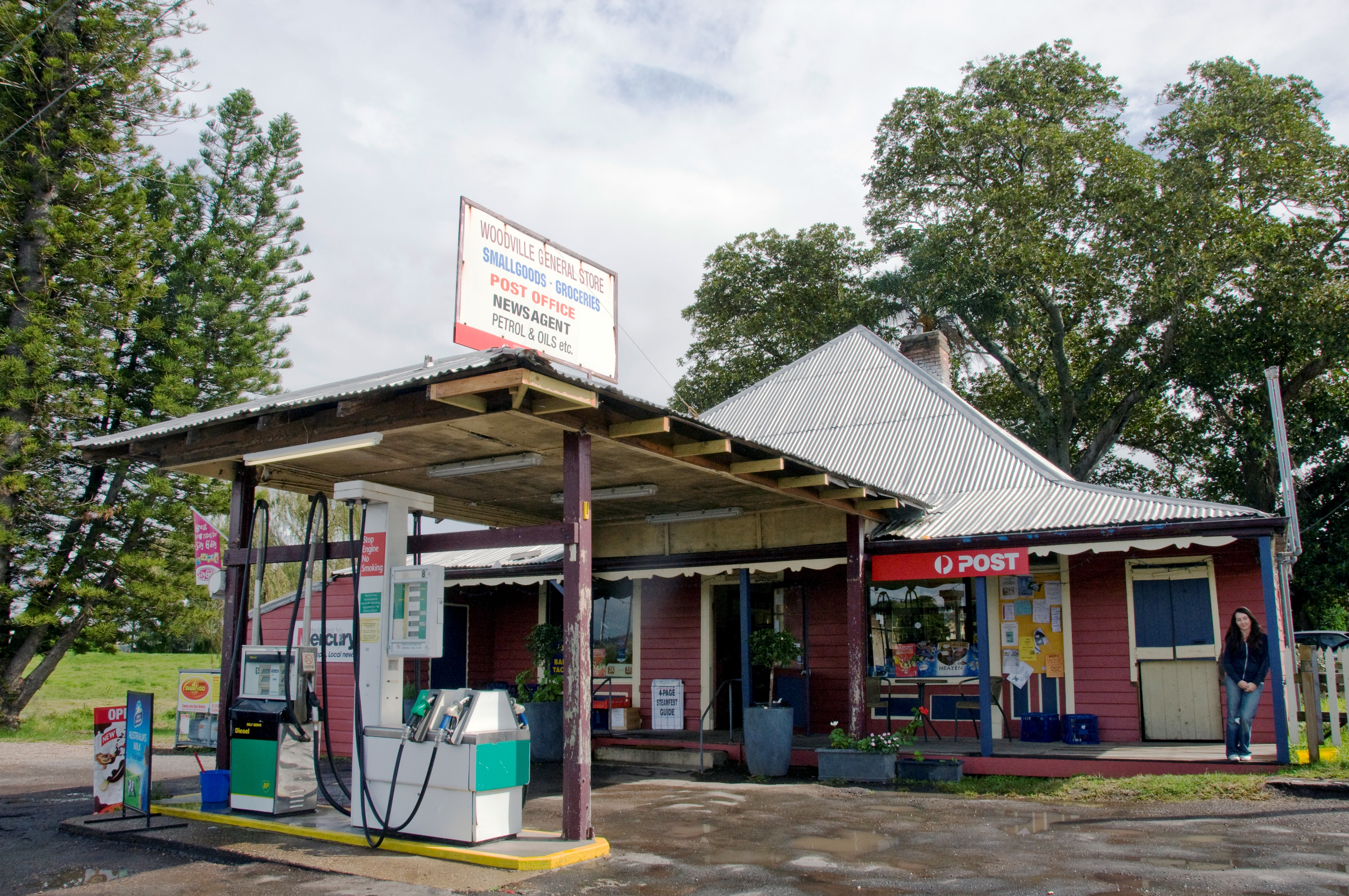
- The historic timber general store at Woodville.

- Interactive map of Woodville
- Coordinates: 32°40′33″S 151°36′34.7″E
- Country: Australia
- State: New South Wales
- Region: Hunter
- LGAs: Port Stephens Council; Maitland City Council
- Location: 174 km (108 mi) N of Sydney; 42 km (26 mi) NW of Newcastle; 19 km (12 mi) WNW of Raymond Terrace; 11.5 km (7.1 mi) NNE of Maitland

Government
  - State electorate: Port Stephens
  - Federal division: Lyne

Area (Note: Area calculation is based on 1:100000 map 9232 NEWCASTLE.)
  - Total: 21.5 km^{2} (8.3 sq mi)
- Elevation (Note: Average elevation of the suburb as shown on 1:100000 map 9232 NEWCASTLE.): 6 m (20 ft)

Population
  - Total: 440 (SAL 2021)
  - Density: 25.6/km^{2} (66/sq mi)
- Time zone: UTC+10 (AEST)
  - Summer (DST): UTC+11 (AEDT)
- Postcode: 2321
- County: Durham
- Parish: Butterwick
- Mean max temp: 29.6 °C (85.3 °F)
- Mean min temp: 6.1 °C (43.0 °F)
- Annual rainfall: 925.2 mm (36.43 in)
Suburbs around Woodville
Tocal	Duns Creek, Butterwick	Seaham
Mindaribba	Woodville	Seaham
Bolwarra Heights	Wallalong	Seaham

Woodville is a rural suburb in the Hunter Valley of New South Wales, Australia that is shared between the Port Stephens and Maitland local government areas (LGA). Most of the suburb lies to the east of the Paterson River in the Port Stephens LGA while a small area of approximately 1.3 square kilometres (0.5 sq mi), to the west of the Paterson, is within the boundaries of the Maitland LGA.

== Land use ==
Woodville's primary land use is agricultural, although housing and small-acre rural residential lots are increasingly significant. Its agriculture consists mainly of broad-acre hay production, along with beef cattle grazing, turf-farming, poultry and olive production. It sits on the floodplains of the lower Hunter River and is subject to periodic flooding.

== Township ==
The suburb's centre consists of only a few buildings: an old timber shop, a few houses of mixed age and design and the All Saints sandstone gothic style church. The church is now privately owned and although no longer used for religious services, the heritage listed chapel is non-denominational and available for weddings both civil and religious while the timber hall associated with the church is now a function centre.

== History ==
The Woodville region was occupied originally by Aboriginal people, most likely the Worimi. It offered abundant natural resources, with rivers, extensive wetlands, lakes, open woodland and rainforest. In the early 19th century, the first Europeans known to enter the region were timber-getters seeking to exploit the extensive red cedar trees that grew on and near the banks of the Paterson and Hunter rivers. Felled trees were floated down-river to timber mills in Newcastle.

Woodville has some significant historical buildings, such as Dunmore House, the Woodville shop/general store is Australia's oldest continually running business still carrying on the same services it was licensed for in 1844. The homestead of the historical property Stradbroke, which is listed in the Australian Heritage Database. Increasingly, traditional farms are being subdivided for semi-rural small holdings.

The Woodville School of Arts dates to 1877. The Gothic Revival All Saints Church is heritage listed and was officially opened in 1864, it features impressive arched and leadlight windows following its restoration work in 1922, the Hall associated with the church was constructed in the 1890s and is of architectural interest. Iona School dates to 1918. Weddings and receptions are regularly held on the site which is unique in the region.

Woodville was also the name of a suburb in Sydney, causing confusion until the name of Woodville in Sydney was transposed to the new name of Villawood.

== Transport ==
Hunter Valley Buses operates one bus route through Woodville:

- 185: Maitland to Gresford via Bolwarra, Largs and Paterson

=== Dunmore Bridge ===
The heritage-listed Dunmore Bridge over the Paterson River is a wooden Allan truss lift-span bridge that was built in 1899. The lift-span is intact although now inoperative. The bridge is located on Clarence Town Road, the main road between Maitland and Paterson, Seaham, Clarence Town and Dungog.

== Image gallery ==
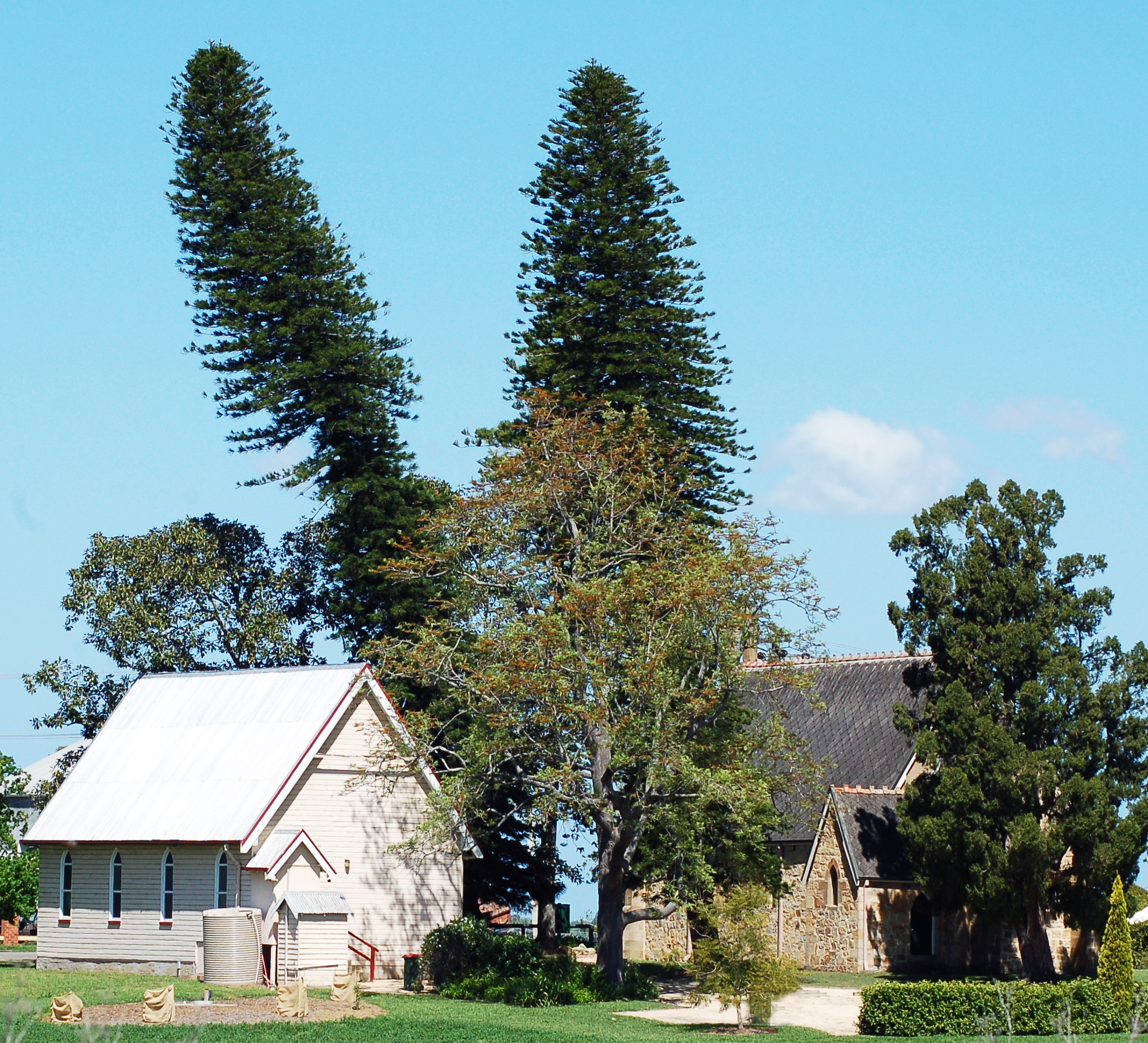
All Saints Church and hall

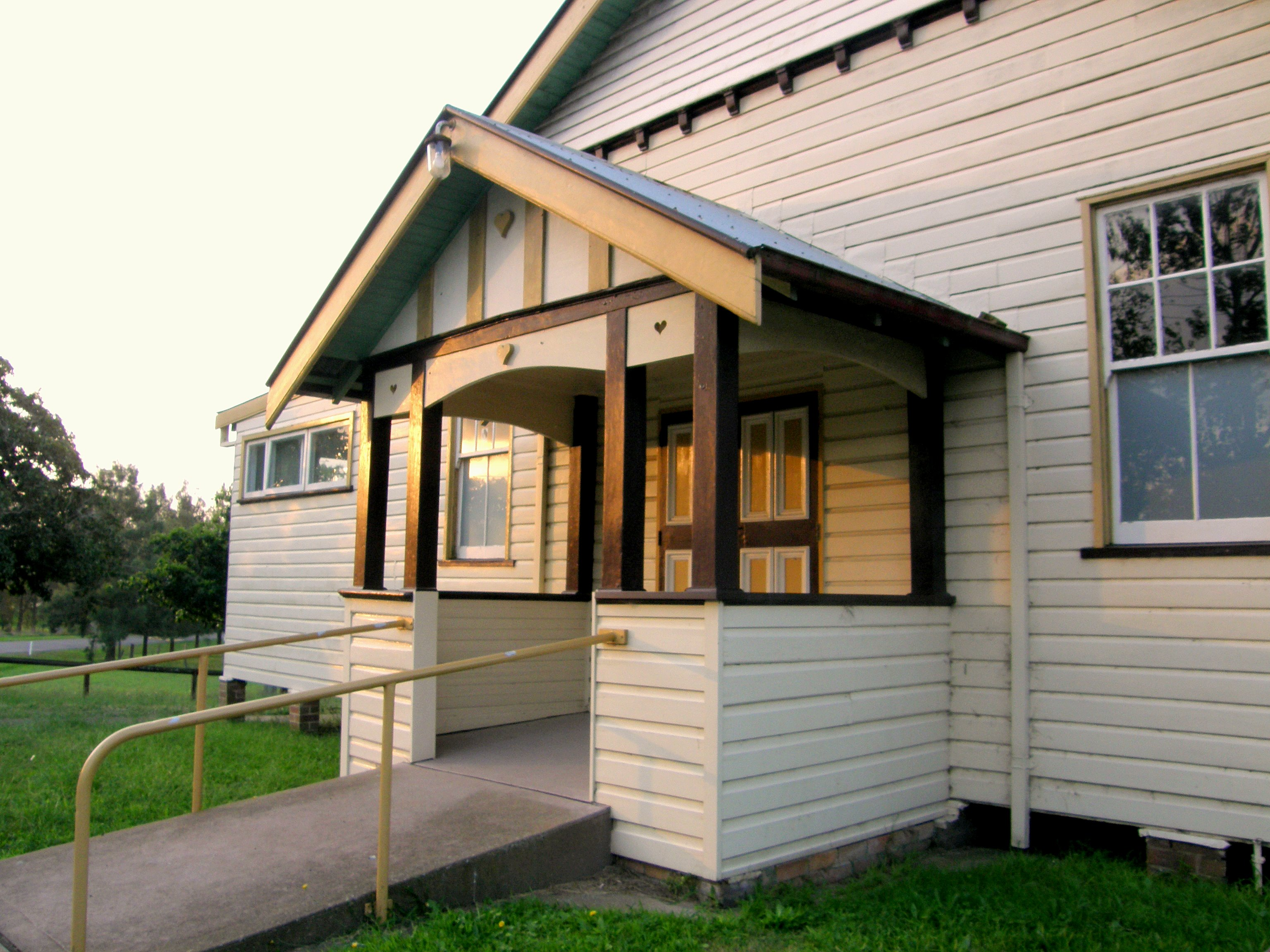
Iona School of Arts, a community hall

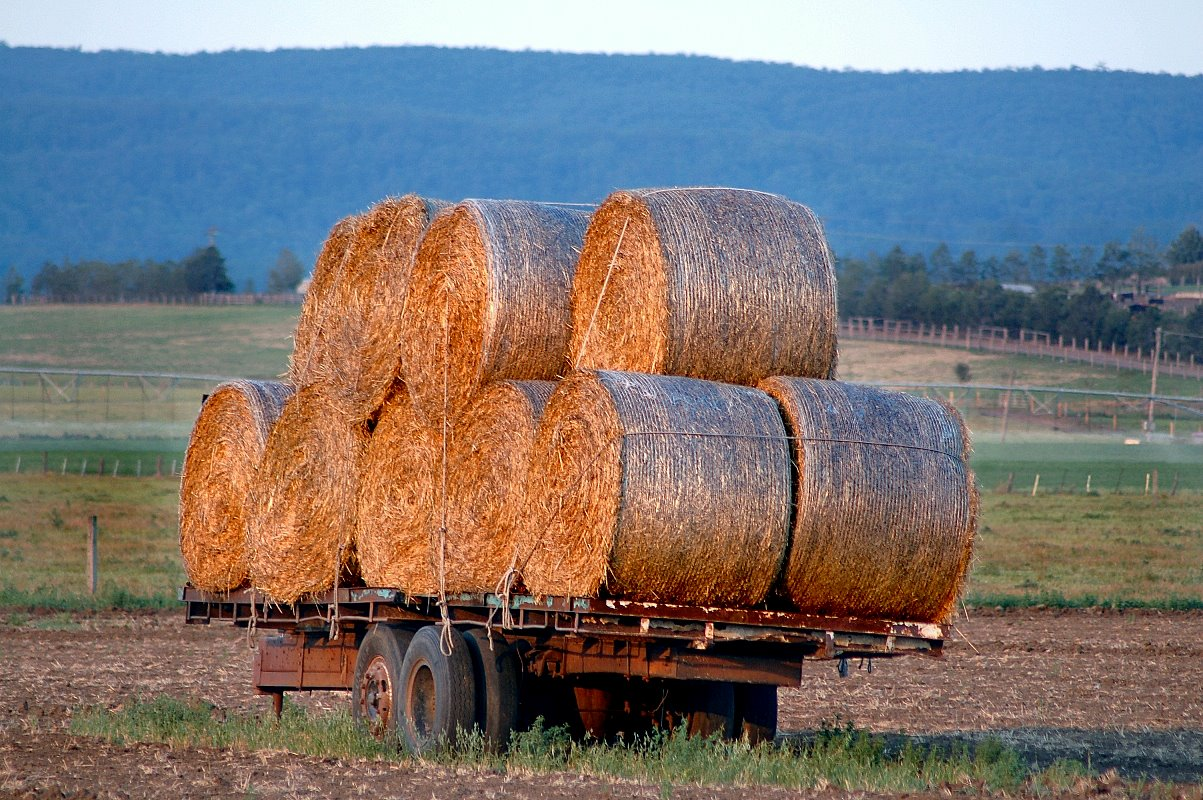
Hay wagon at Woodville

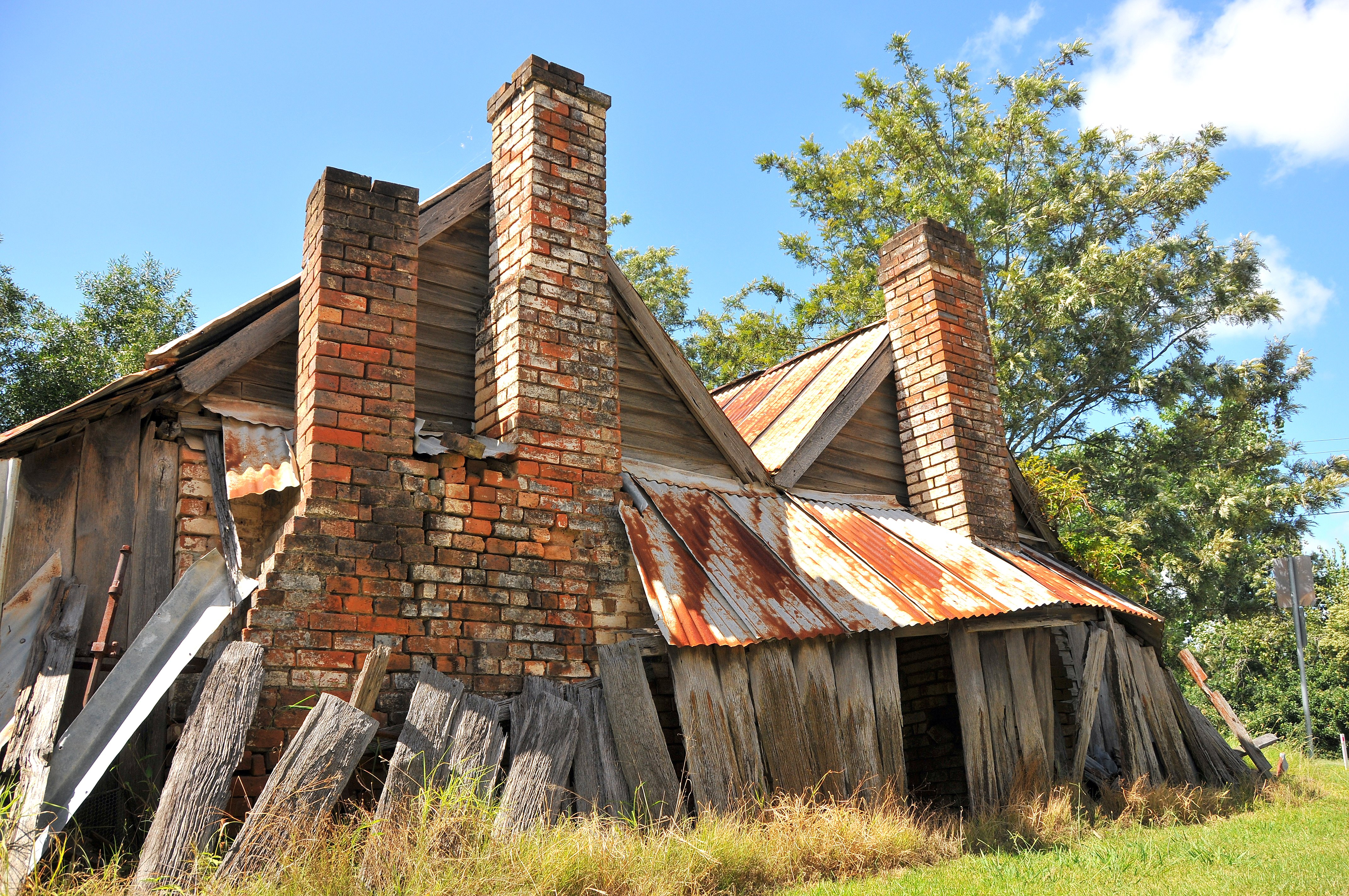
An old abandoned timber and brick house at Iona, Woodville
