= Tocal, New South Wales =

Tocal New South Wales
- Coordinates: 32°38′S 151°36′E
- Population: 47 (SAL 2021)
- Postcode(s): 2421
- Location: 11 km (7 mi) N of Maitland; 180 km (112 mi) N of Sydney
- LGA(s): City of Maitland
- County: Durham
- Parish: Middlehope
- State electorate(s): Maitland
- Federal division(s): Lyne
Suburbs around Tocal:
Paterson
Tocal	Duns Creek
Mindaribba	Woodville

Tocal (meaning 'plenty' in the local Aboriginal language) is a locality situated in the lower Hunter Valley, of New South Wales, Australia. Located approximately 11 kilometres (6.8 mi) north of Maitland, and about 180 kilometres (110 mi) north of Sydney it is located at the junction of the Paterson River and Webbers Creek.

Prior to European exploration, Tocal was home to the Gringai clan of the Wonnarua people. With European settlement, the area became the site of a major homestead and farm. Today the Tocal site has a collection of colonial farm buildings dating from the 1820s, a homestead, converted hay-shed visitors and function centre, and the CB Alexander Campus of Tocal Agricultural College and associated commercial farms.

== History ==
The Tocal area is the traditional land of the Gringai clan of the Wonnarua people, a group of Indigenous Australians. Within the area are Aboriginal stone grindings indicating thousands of years of human activity.

In 1822 land of the area was granted by the colonial government to James Phillips Webber. Approximately 150 convict men and boys were living and working at Tocal between 1822 and 1840. They cleared the land, planted crops and built fences – transforming the area into a large farm. Some of the crops planted included wheat, barley, tobacco and grapes; there were also beef and dairy cattle, horses and merino sheep.

In 1834, Tocal was sold to Caleb and Felix Wilson, father and son. Four years later Caleb died, and in 1841 Felix built a homestead on the property which is still standing today. In 1844 Charles Reynolds began to lease the property from the Wilsons. During the period 1844 to 1926 the Reynolds family ran the property as a stud, breeding Hereford, Devon and thoroughbred studs – some of the best cattle and horses for the time. In 1865 Felix Wilson died and Tocal was willed by entail to his unborn grandson, David Wilson KC, who wasn't born until 1879. It was not until 1907 that Wilson sold Tocal to Charles Reynolds son, Frank.

In 1926 Tocal was sold to Jean Alexander, who lived there with her sister Isabella and brothers Robert and Charles Boyd Alexander. Alexander's family had been blacksmiths and farmers at Nhill, owning 5000 acres in the area before moving to Tocal. Charles siblings Margaret and John had married, and hence been estranged from the family. Jean died in 1938 and left the property to Charles, the youngest. The following year Margaret's daughters Myrtle and Marguerita Curtis came to live with Charles at Tocal.

CB Alexander updated the property with new technology and mechanisation. He paradoxically indulged in the purchase of three Rolls-Royce vehicles, despite his continual frugality in general. Realising his family line was at its end, he looked toward leaving the entire estate toward developing numerous agricultural colleges; As his estate still held land at 5 areas in NSW, he suggested numerous colleges – multiple at each area. He died in 1947, leaving a complex will. The will was mostly disregarded as unworkable, but was implemented in spirit by eventually providing for the establishment of the CB Alexander Agricultural College, Tocal, under the Presbyterian Church. Work began on the college in 1963 and it was opened by the Prime Minister Sir Robert Menzies in 1965. In 1970 the college was run by the NSW Department of Agriculture.

The Curtis sisters never married and continued to live at the homestead until their deaths in 1985, when management of Tocal Homestead passed to the CB Alexander Foundation. In 1987 Tocal Homestead was first opened to visitors. In 2002 the Tocal Homestead Visitor Centre was opened after extensive renovations to an existing hay shed. It is now a popular location for wedding receptions.

== Heritage listings ==
Tocal has a number of heritage-listed sites, including:

- 815 Tocal Road: Tocal College

=== Homestead ===
In 1841 Felix Wilson hired an architect (Moir) to design a homestead at Tocal. Originally built as a weekender, the building is a Colonial Georgian country house, with a five bay façade. Built of sandstock brick with a slate roof, the house is four rooms square with French doors onto a three-sided verandah. A separate kitchen with dining rooms are connected to the homestead by a covered walkway at the rear of the house. The sandstone was quarried at Tocal, the timber (cedar and hardwood) came from the area and even the bricks were fired on site. A ballroom upstairs has been converted into a master ensuite bathroom. CB Alexander installed one of the first residential electric elevators in the homestead (since removed), which was powered by a kerosene generator from one of the outbuildings. It sits atop a small hill, overlooking a lagoon. Several large fig trees were planted at the same time as the foundation of the building and still surround the homestead today.

=== College ===
The design of the college was open to competition, and the winning design was by Philip Cox and Ian McKay. The surrounding landscape was a major source of inspiration for their plans: College buildings were designed to fit into the hill-top, to become a part of the landscape with a chapel as the centrepiece. The college design won the Sulman and Blacket Awards for Architecture in 1965.

== Field Days ==
In May 1984 the first Tocal Field Day was held.

== Landscape ==
There is a variety of landscapes at Tocal: a lagoon, a mix of heavily timbered country, native/naturalised pasture, improved pasture, degraded improved pasture and European-style landscaping.

The large lagoon was one of the attractions of this area for both Aboriginal people and European settlers, providing a permanent source of fresh water for people and animals. Tocal's proximity to the river was also a factor in Europeans settlement as the river was a major transport route for 100 years.

With European settlement, much of the land was cleared of natural timbers and shrubs for building materials and to allow for crops and grazing. Recently, rainforest and wetlands areas have been reintroduced, interspersed with small areas of agricultural land. In contrast, around the lagoon are poplars and willows and other introduced species are on the homestead's hill.

The area around the homestead and College consists of open grassland with scattered trees. More native species, including tall spotted gums, are being planted but the area will remain grazing land. Rainforest restoration has commenced along Webber's Creek where remnant cedar and riparian vegetation remains.

The lagoon and wetlands are very changeable, for Tocal is subject to regular flooding. Whilst floods can inconvenience farm operations, the sediment left behind as the floodwaters recede has been vital to the fertility of these flats.
