= Oakhampton Heights =

Oakhampton Heights is a suburb of the City of Maitland, New South Wales, Australia.

== Shooting ==
On March 20th, 2005, Sally Elizabeth Winter, armed with a rifle, shot and killed her husband Stephen, her son Jake, and her daughter Casey, before committing suicide. Police previously confiscated the rifle in connection with their investigation of a verbal argument, but it was returned procedurally. Police from New South Wales' Lower Hunter Command defended the seizure and return.

== Heritage listings ==
Oakhampton Heights has heritage-listed sites, including:

- 55 Scobies Lane: Walka Water Works
