= Mindaribba railway station =

Railway station in New South Wales, Australia

Mindaribba
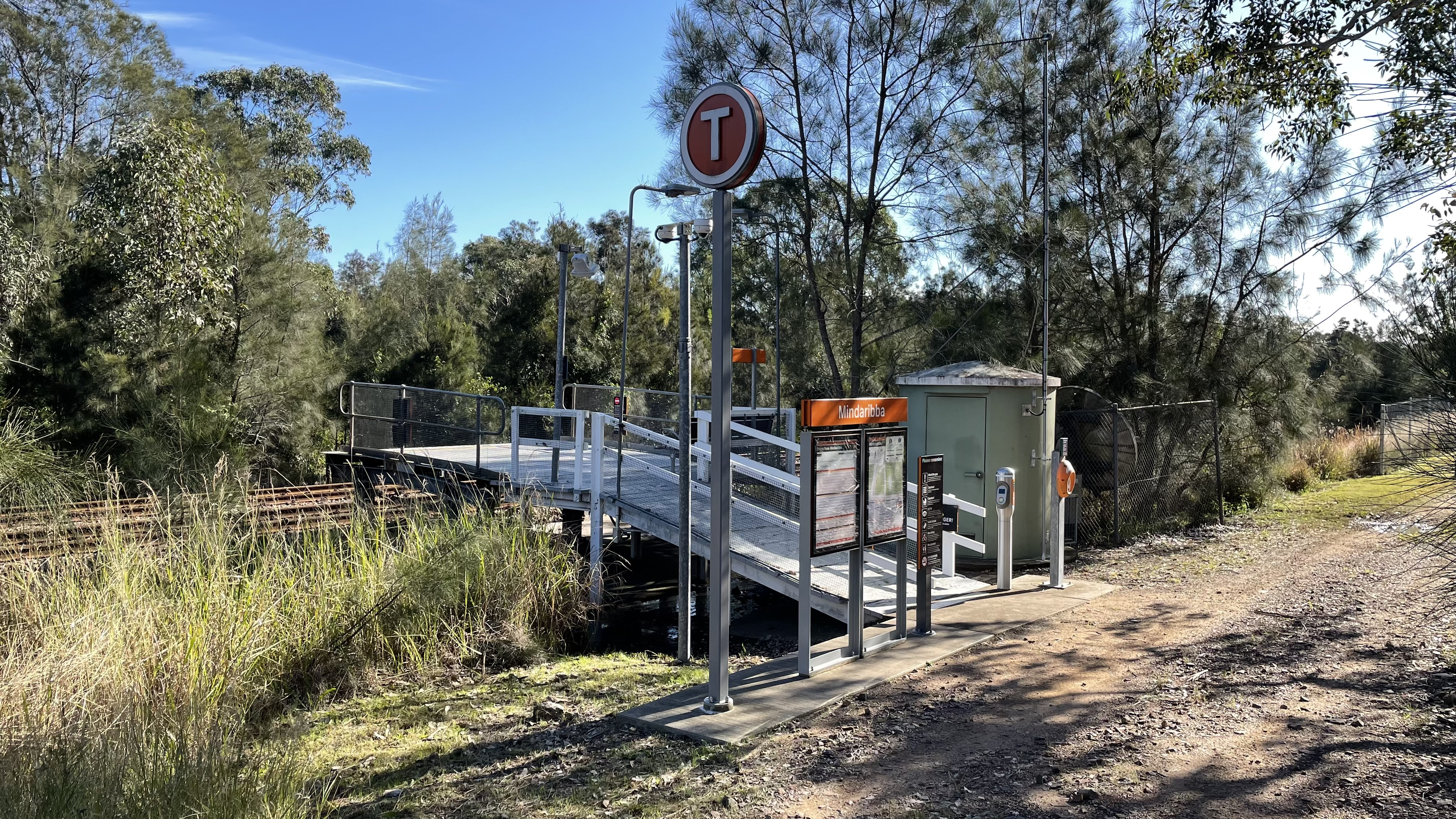
- Station entrance and small platform, June 2024

General information
- Location: Tocal Road, Mindaribba; Australia
- Coordinates: 32°40′06″S 151°35′04″E
- Owner: Transport Asset Manager of New South Wales
- Operator: Sydney Trains
- Line: North Coast
- Distance: 203.46 km (126.42 mi) from Central
- Platforms: 1
- Tracks: 2

Construction
- Structure type: Ground
- Accessible: Yes

Other information
- Station code: MNB
- Website: Transport for NSW

History
- Opened: 14 August 1911
- Former names: Dunmore (1911–1912)

Passengers
- 2023: Less than 50 every month. (Sydney Trains, NSW TrainLink)

Services
Preceding station	Intercity Trains	Following station
Paterson towards Dungog	Hunter Line	Telarah towards Newcastle Interchange
Location

Mindaribba railway station is located on the North Coast line in New South Wales, Australia. Originally a full-length platform, it was later replaced by the present short platform. It serves the rural locality of Mindaribba. It is served by Sydney Trains Hunter Line services travelling between Newcastle and Dungog.

The station opened on 14 August 1911 as Dunmore and was renamed Mindaribba the following year.

== Platforms and services ==
Mindaribba consists of a single wooden platform about three metres long. It is served by Sydney Trains Hunter Line services travelling between Newcastle and Dungog. There are five Dungog services and four Newcastle services on weekdays, with three services in each direction on weekends and public holidays. It is a request stop with passengers required to notify the guard if they wish to alight.

Opposite the platform is a 1,562 metre crossing loop.

Platform	Line	Stopping pattern	Notes
1	HUN	services to Dungog (3–5 per day)	request stop
1	HUN	services to Newcastle (3–4 per day)	request stop

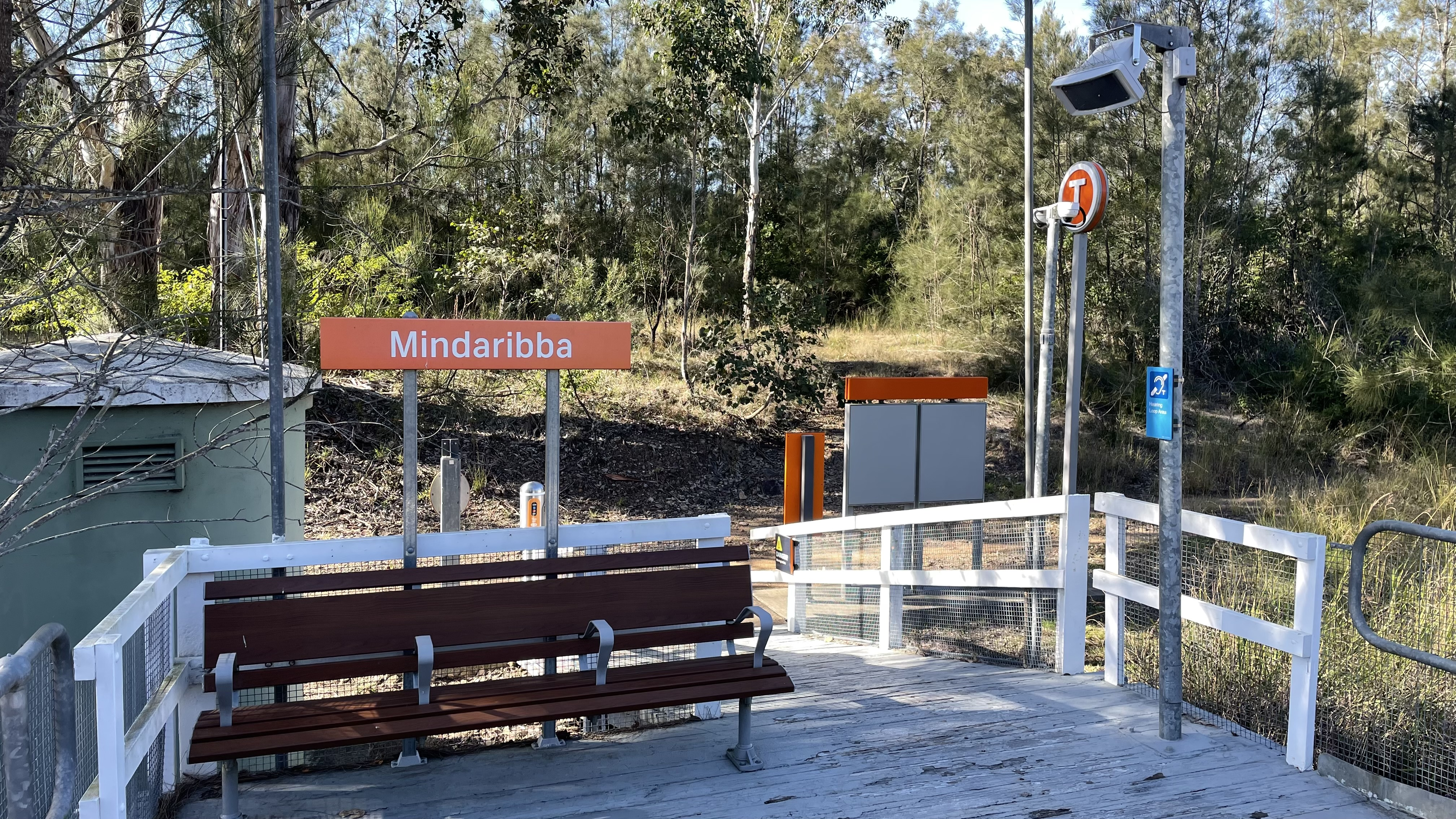
Platform

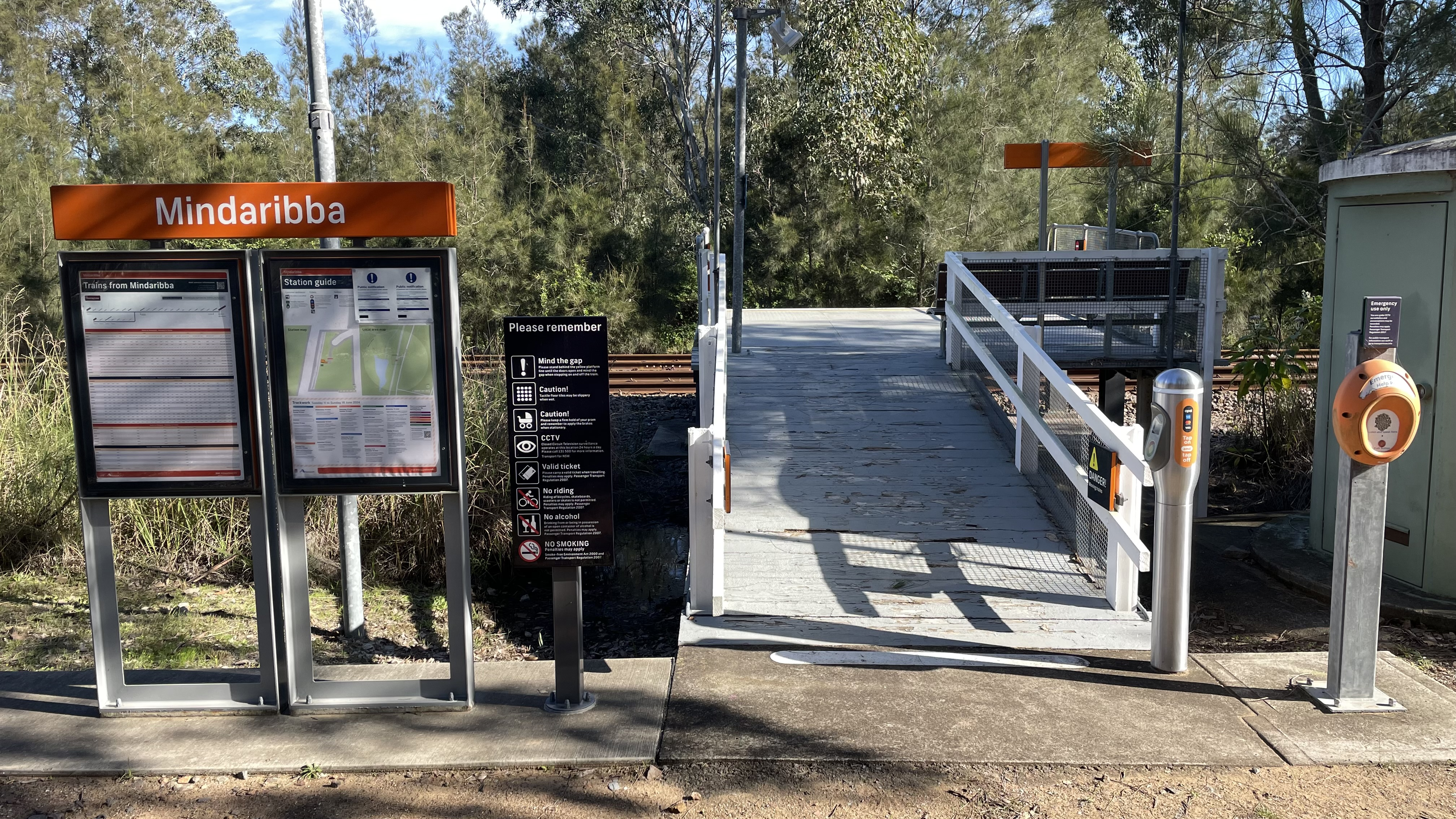
Entrance ramp
