= Gillieston Heights =

- Suburb
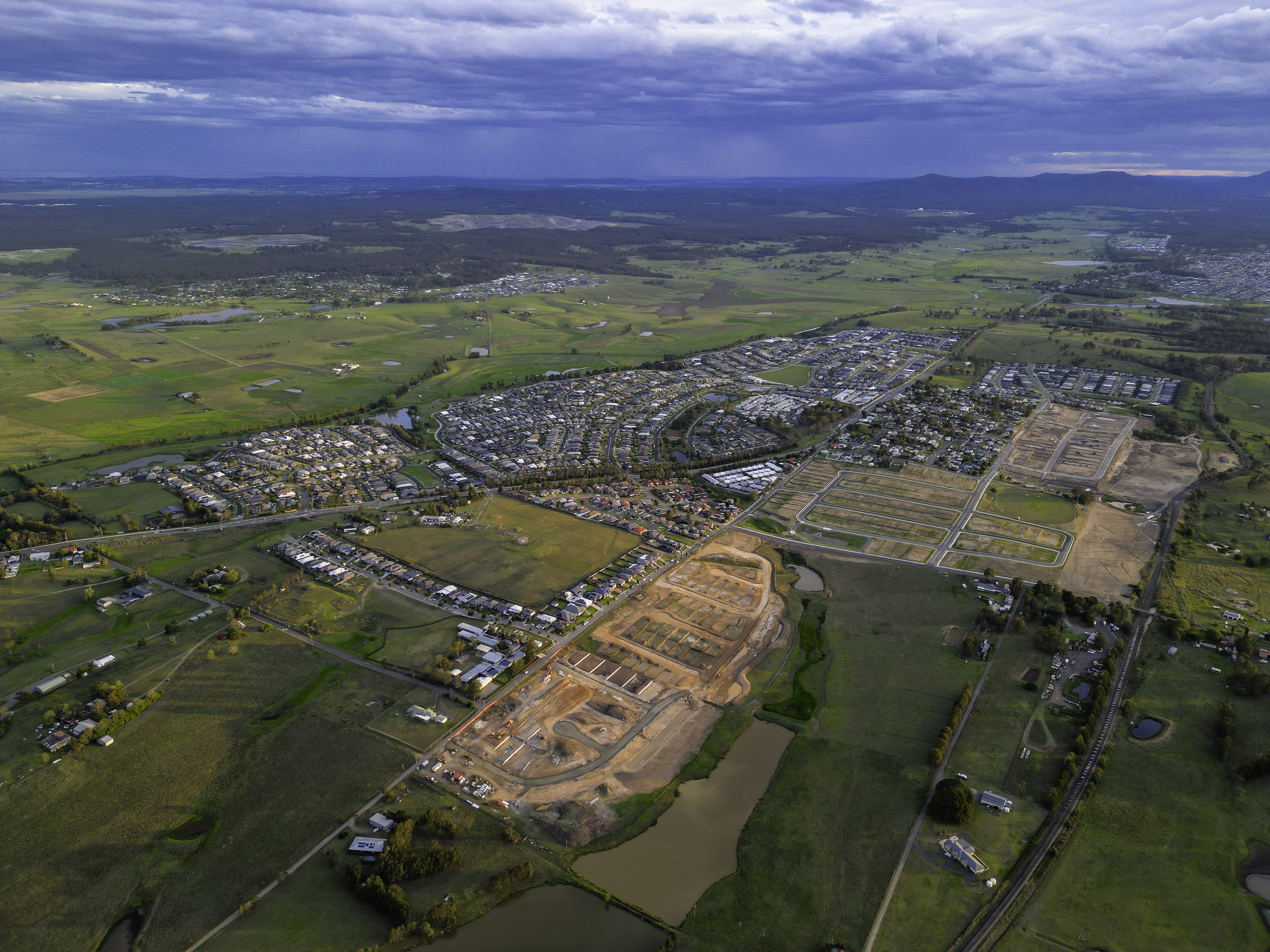
- Aerial photo of Gillieston Heights

- Coordinates: 32°45′54″S 151°32′4″E
- Country: Australia
- State: New South Wales
- Region: Hunter
- City: Maitland
- LGA: City of Maitland
- Location: 156 km (97 mi) N of Sydney; 36.5 km (22.7 mi) WNW of Newcastle; 5.1 km (3.2 mi) S of Maitland

Government
  - State electorate: Maitland
  - Federal division: Hunter

Area
  - Total: 13.8 km^{2} (5.3 sq mi)

Population
  - Total: 4,796 (2021 census)
  - Density: 347.5/km^{2} (900/sq mi)
- Time zone: UTC+10 (AEST)
  - Summer (DST): UTC+11 (AEDT)
- Postcode: 2321
- County: Northumberland
- Parish: Heddon

Gillieston Heights is a suburb of the City of Maitland local government area in the Hunter Region of New South Wales, Australia, approximately 5.1 km (3.2 mi) from the Maitland CBD. Prior to 1967, the village was named East Greta however this was changed to honour former Maitland mayor and member of the New South Wales Legislative Assembly John Gillies following a poll of residents. At the 2021 census, Gillieston Heights had a population of 4,796.

== History ==
The traditional owners and custodians of the Maitland area are the Wonnarua people.

Following the discovery of high quality coal by prospector T.W. Edgeworth David in 1888, a group of local businessmen purchased 245 acres (99 ha) of land surrounding present-day Gillieston Heights and were within weeks able to produce coal which was transported by dray to Maitland for sale. To capitalise on this success, the East Greta Coal Mining Company was established in 1891. The company constructed a railway line from West Maitland to the East Greta colliery, completed in 1893. Orders to supply coal for power companies in Sydney, Melbourne and Bundaberg saw the company declare a dividend in 1896 and expand its operations, sinking a second mine shaft the same year.

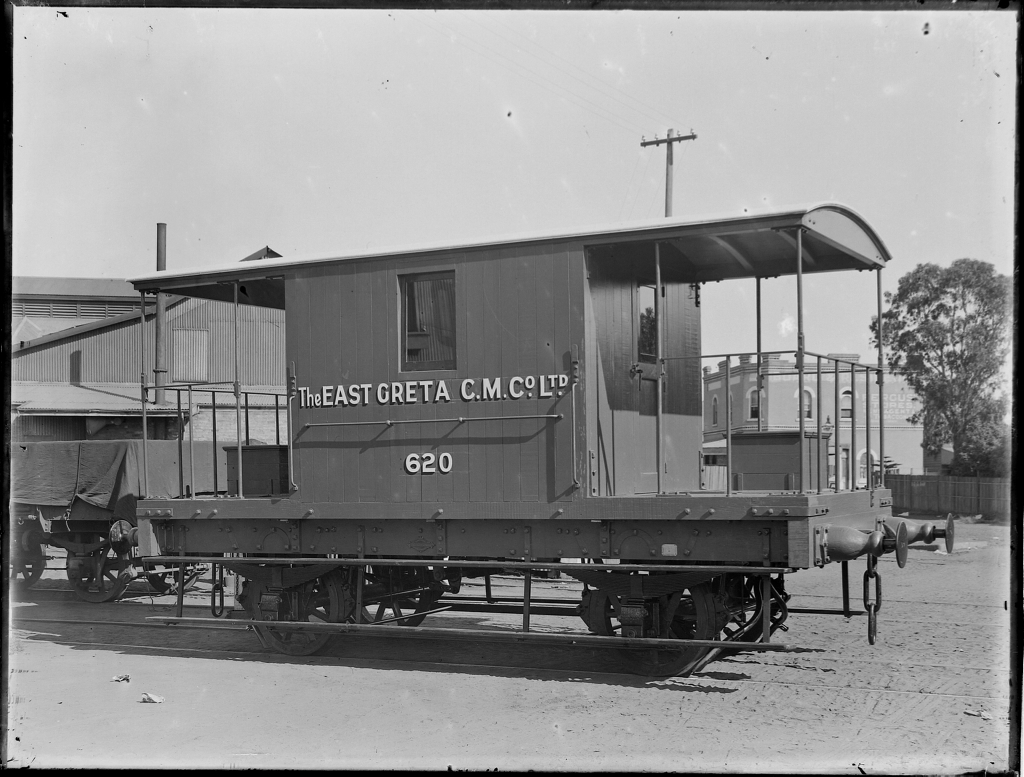
The East Greta C.M. Company Ltd. vehicle 620

As the coal mining activities in the area were expanded, the railway line from Maitland was extended further to the south, and a station platform was opened at East Greta in 1902, with passenger services to Stanford Merthyr near the town of Kurri Kurri. Initially, passengers had to walk to Maitland railway station to connect with trains operated by New South Wales Government Railways, but in 1903 this service was extended to Maitland, and a year later to Cessnock on the newly extended South Maitland Railway. Mining operations at the East Greta colliery ceased following a miners strike in 1929 and subsidence caused by floods in 1930s damaged the workings. After closure the plant & rail sidings at the 2 collieries were soon removed. The village consisting of permanent dwellings which had been erected to house miners remained. After the closure of the mine, the town continued to be served by passenger trains until 1967 when the privately run passenger service over the line between Cessnock and Maitland ended. Coal traffic over the line to services to collieries in the Cessnock area continued.

Since 2005, Gillieston Heights has experienced rapid population growth, with large residential developments approved as part of the Maitland City Council's urban settlement strategy. The population doubled between 2005 and 2011, with the rapid growth placing pressure on Gillieston Public School, leading to the acquisition of more land for future expansion.

== Population ==
According to the 2021 census, there were 4,796 people in Gillieston Heights.

- Aboriginal and Torres Strait Islander people made up 7.9% of the population.
- 87.7% of people were born in Australia and 90.1% of people spoke only English at home.
- The most common responses for religion were No Religion 45.6%, Catholic 20.0% and Anglican 16.2%.

== Transport ==
Gillieston Heights is served by Rover Coaches route 164 to Cessnock and Maitland. The rapid population growth in the suburb and other former mining villages in the area has led to calls by Maitland and Cessnock councils to reinstate passenger services on the South Maitland Railway, connecting to Newcastle to ease congestion on regional roads. A new station at Gillieston Heights has been identified as a priority.
