= Windermere, New South Wales =

Windermere
- Suburb
- Coordinates: 32°40′54″S 151°26′34″E
- Country: Australia
- State: New South Wales
- Region: Hunter
- City: Maitland
- LGA: City of Maitland
- Location: 180 km (110 mi) N of Sydney; 47 km (29 mi) WNW of Newcastle; 14 km (8.7 mi) WNW of Maitland

Government
  - State electorate: Maitland
  - Federal division: Hunter

Population
  - Total: 64 (SAL 2021)
- Time zone: UTC+10 (AEST)
  - Summer (DST): UTC+11 (AEDT)
- Postcode: 2321
- County: Northumberland
- Parish: Gosforth

Windermere is a suburb of the City of Maitland local government area in the Hunter Region of New South Wales, Australia, approximately 14 km (8.7 mi) from the Maitland CBD. It is named after the Windermere estate. Windermere House is the historic homestead of Tom White Melville Winder and the oldest house in the Hunter Region.
