= Oswald, New South Wales =

Oswald Maitland, New South Wales
- Coordinates: 32°41′24″S 151°25′4″E
- Population: 88 (SAL 2016)
- Postcode(s): 2321
- Time zone: AEST (UTC+10)
  - Summer (DST): AEDT (UTC+11)
- Location: 181 km (112 mi) N of Sydney; 48 km (30 mi) WNW of Newcastle; 15 km (9 mi) W of Maitland
- LGA(s): City of Maitland
- Region: Hunter
- County: Northumberland
- Parish: Branxton
- State electorate(s): Maitland
- Federal division(s): Hunter

Oswald is a suburb of the City of Maitland local government area in the Hunter Region of New South Wales, Australia, approximately 15 km (9 mi) from the Maitland CBD.
