= Aberglasslyn, New South Wales =

Coordinates: 32°41′40.76″S 151°32′4.59″E

Aberglasslyn
- Suburb
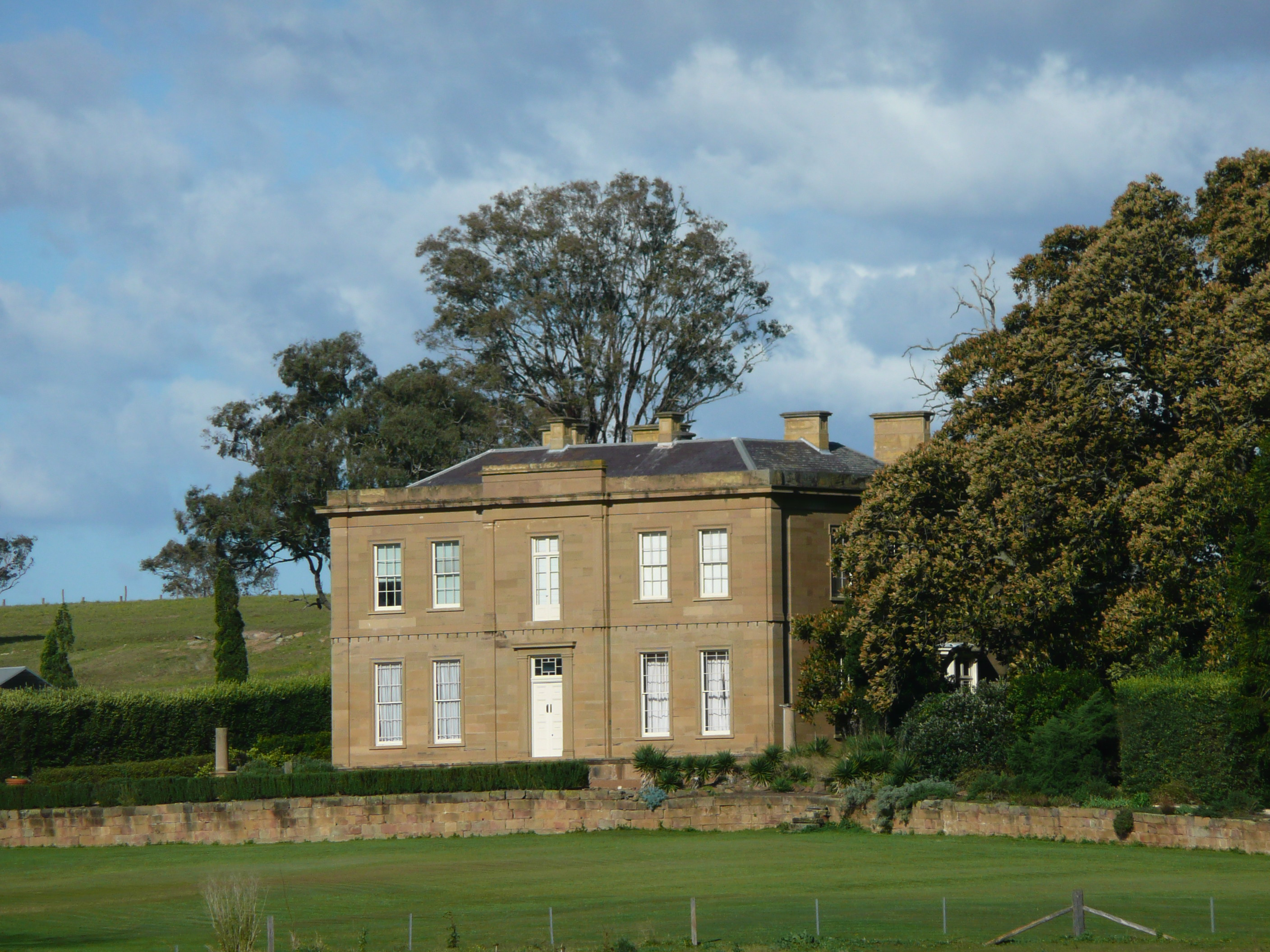
- Aberglasslyn House
- Coordinates
- Country: Australia
- State: New South Wales
- Region: Hunter
- City: Maitland
- LGA: City of Maitland

Government
  - State electorate: Maitland
  - Federal division: Paterson

Population
  - Total: 6,552 (2021 census)
- Postcode: 2320

Aberglasslyn is a rapidly expanding suburb of Maitland, located in the Hunter Valley of New South Wales Australia.

== Transport ==
Hunter Valley Buses operates two bus routes through Aberglasslyn:

- 177: Rutherford to Aberglasslyn via Budgeree Dr
- 186: Rutherford to Aberglasslyn via Denton Park Dr

== Description and history ==
The traditional owners and custodians of the Maitland area are the Wonnarua people.

Once known as "The Country Estate", Aberglasslyn was surrounded by paddocks and bushland which have now been developed into numerous sub-divisions such as "The Sanctuary" and "Weblands Wonderland". Aberglasslyn provides views of the hills of Maitland Vale and Rosebrook, situated near the Hunter River. It still retains some bushland which has been listed as a nature reserve.

Aberglasslyn House (circa 1840), a private residence, looks over a bend in the Hunter River and is built completely out of sandstone. Aberglasslyn House is one of the most important early Colonial homes in Australia. With its vast cellars, this early stone mansion has the potential to become the only "chateau style" boutique vineyard in the Hunter. It was built by George Hobler, and designed by John Verge who was born in Christchurch, Dorset, England.

The name is said to be a combination of "Aberdeen" and "Glasgow", though it is more likely to be from the place in Wales so called - Aberglaslyn, spelt Aberglasslyn by English writers in the 1800s. This Welsh name means the "mouth of the river Glaslyn" (aber = river mouth). See Afon Glaslyn. The Glaslyn used to enter Cardigan Bay at this point (it is now at some distance from the sea after land reclamation). "Glaslyn" is "blue lake", and is the name of the lake from which the river flows down to the sea and from which it has taken its name.

== Heritage listings ==
Aberglasslyn has a number of heritage-listed sites, including:

- Aberglasslyn Road: Aberglasslyn House
