= Lochinvar, New South Wales =

Village in New South Wales, Australia

Coordinates: 32°42′S 151°27′E

Lochinvar is a village in the Hunter Region of New South Wales, Australia, eleven kilometres west of the regional centre of Maitland. Lochinvar is within the boundaries of the City of Maitland local government area and is named after Lochinvar, a loch in southern Scotland.

A historic home and property called Windermere House is located near the town which underpins the history of Lochinvar. There are other historic houses in the Hunter region and Lochinvar, as it is one of the oldest towns in Australia.

At the 2016 census, Lochinvar had a population of 784 people.

== History ==
The town was very important for the History of agriculture in the area. It is one of the oldest towns in the Hunter Region.

The Windermere homestead (built around 1821-1823) by the Winder family (“Tom” i.e. Thomas White Melville Winder). It is the oldest homestead in the Hunter Region and likely built up by convicts and emancipated previously convict workers.

The Lochinvar house was built in 1841 and is also recognised as an important historic building in the area. It was operating as a guest house (bed and breakfast as at April 2024. There is some information about convicts that are connected with this house and other historic houses in the area.

Temperature and weather records were kept from early times. Some weather history is still available (see references for history between 1843 and 1870, also between 1864 and 1870.

== Soil ==
According to Maitland Council development study pg.21 the soil on the slopes includes topsoil with clay underneath.

== Education ==
On the highway through the town is a large Catholic convent housing the Sisters of St Joseph (1883). There is a secondary college on the grounds, St Joseph's College - a coeducational college which caters for students from Years 7–12. It was once also a boarding school for girls. It is also the site of Lochinvar Public School, as well as St Patrick's Lochinvar, the local Catholic primary school.

== Transport ==
The town is mostly built up along the busy New England Highway between the major centres of Maitland and Singleton and is 165 kilometres north of Sydney. Most people in the area work in nearby Maitland or Singleton. Lochinvar railway station is some two kilometres south of the village.

Hunter Valley Buses operates three bus routes through the village of Lochinvar.

== Notable people ==
- Thomas White Melville Winder (1787-1853), originally received the land grant and planted the first grapes in the Hunter Valley, built “Windermere” (See “Windermere House”, NSW).
- Actress sisters Abbie and Isabelle Cornish were born in the village in 1982 and 1994 respectively.
- John Madsen - academic, physicist, engineer, mathematician
