= Anambah =

- Town
- Coordinates: 32°40′30″S 151°29′30″E
- Country: Australia
- State: New South Wales
- LGA: City of Maitland
- Location: 9 km (5.6 mi) NSW of Maitland

Government
  - State electorate: Maitland
  - Federal division: Paterson

Population
  - Total: 64 (2021 census)
- Postcode: 2320

Anambah is a locality in the City of Maitland region of New South Wales. It had a population of 64 as of the 2021 census.

It is scheduled for suburban development in future as a continuation of the Maitland growth corridor.

== Notable people ==
- Henry Luke White born there in 1860.

== Heritage listings ==
Anambah has a number of heritage-listed sites, including:

- Anambah Road: Anambah House
