= Wonnarua =

Aboriginal Australian people of New South Wales

Wonnarua people
- aka: Wonnuaruah/Wonarua/Wannerawa
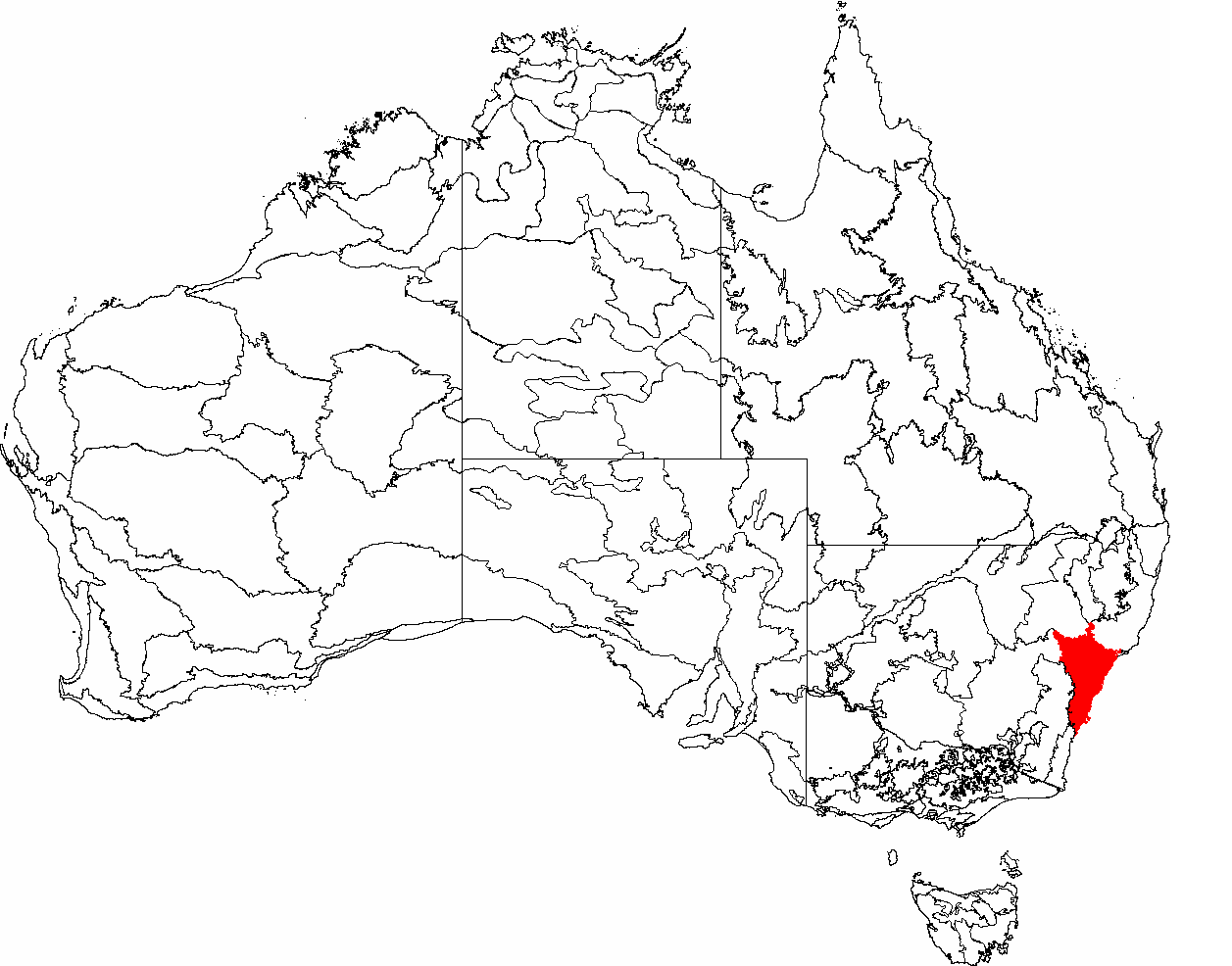
- Hunter Region bioregion

Hierarchy
- Language family: Pama–Nyungan
- Language branch: Yuin–Kuric
- Language group: (??)
- Group dialects: Hunter River and Lake Macquarie Language (Awabakal-Wanarruwa)

Area (approx. 5,200 sq. km)
- Bioregion: Hunter Region
- Location: Upper Hunter Valley, New South Wales
- Coordinates: 32°35′S 150°50′E
- Mountains: Liverpool Range; Barrington Tops
- Rivers: Upper Hunter River; Allyn River; Williams River
- Other geological: Yengo National Park

Notable individuals
- Jackey Jackey

The Wonnarua people, otherwise written Wanarruwa, are a group of Aboriginal Australian people united by strong ties of kinship, and who survived in family groups or clans scattered along the inland area of what is now known as the Upper Hunter Valley, New South Wales, Australia. Their creation spirit is Baiami, also known as Koin, the creator of all things and the Keeper of the Valley.

== Language ==
The origin of the Wonnarua language is unclear; however, linguists group closely related dialects together under the description "language of the Hunter River/Lake Macquarie" (HRLM). That term denotes the geographical location of the closely related dialects rather than the name of the language group. The area extends from north of the Hawkesbury–MacDonald River (HMR) language and south of the Lower North Coast language (LNC). Exact geographical locations of the language groups are, at this stage, speculative.

== Country ==
Their traditional territory, estimated to comprise an area extending over 2,000 square miles (5,200 km^{2}), spreads from the Upper Hunter River above Maitland, west to the Great Dividing Range, towards Wollombi. The Wonnarua were bounded to the north by the Geawegal people, to the north–east by the Worimi peoples, to the south east by the Awabakal people, to the south by the Darkinung and to the west by the Wiradjuri people. The Wonnarua also had trade and ceremonial links with the Kamilaroi people.

== People ==
The Wonnarua, at the beginning of contact with Europeans, are estimated to have numbered around 500.

The Gringai were a clan of the Worimi, whose traditional lands are in the Dungog area.

== Native title ==
On behalf of the Plains Clans of the Wonnarua People, Scott Franks and Anor put in a native title claim on 19 August 2013. The document claimed rights over an area of roughly 9,500 square kilometres (3,700 mi^{2}), embracing the catchment zone within the Great Dividing Range, the Liverpool Range, and the major rivers coming out of the Barringtons, under Yango. The claim included Singleton, Muswellbrook, Dungog, Maitland, and the shire council lands of the Upper Hunter. The claim was registered in January 2015 and referred to the Federal Court to deliberate over the claim and to make a determination. However, it was ultimately discontinued and removed from the register of native title claims on 2 March 2020. The discontinuance appears to have been the result of disputes with other Aboriginal people who claimed native title in the area but in a different way and these disputes led to an independent anthropologist, Dr Lee Sackett, being appointed by the Court to prepare a report to resolve the different views of native title in the area. Dr Sackett's conclusions were to the effect that key details of the claim's structure were not supported by the evidence.

== Notable Wonnarua people ==
- Jackey Jackey – a guide and companion to surveyor Edmund Kennedy
- Charles Frederick Maynard - an activist

== Alternative names ==
- Wannerawa
- Wonnah
- Wonnuaruah/Wonarua

Source: Tindale 1974, p. 201

== Sources ==
- "EDITORIAL: Wonnarua native title claim". The Newcastle Herald. 16 January 2015.
- Franks, Scott; Lester, Robert John (19 August 2013). "Scott Franks and Anor on behalf of the Plains Clans of the Wonnarua People". National Native Title Tribunal.
- Frick, Erin (6 March 2014). "Heritage listing for NSW Aboriginal cave". Australian Geographic.
- Hobson, John Robert (2010). Re-awakening Languages: Theory and Practice in the Revitalisation of Australia's Indigenous Languages. Sydney University Press. ISBN 978-1-920-89955-4.
- Lissarrague, Amanda (2006). "Wonnarua (NSW)" (PDF). A salvage grammar and wordlist of the language from the Hunter River and Lake Macquarie. Muurrbay Aboriginal Language and Culture Cooperative. ISBN 0-9775351-0-X. Archived from the original (PDF) on 10 April 2013.
- "Maitland History: Wonnarua People". Australian Museum of Clothing and Textiles.
- McCarthy, Joanne (16 January 2015). "Native Title Game-changer for Coal". The Newcastle Herald.
- "Meet the Mob: Scott Franks". ABC News, Newcastle. 12 June 2015.
- Miller, Robert (1887). "No. 188: The Hunter River" (PDF). In Curr, Edward (ed.). The Australian race: its origins, languages, customs, place of landing in Australia, and the routes by which it spread itself over that continent. Vol. 3. Melbourne: Government Printer. pp. 352–357. Alternate copy.
- "Strategic Plan 2009–2019" (PDF). Wonnarua Nation Aboriginal Corporation.
- Tindale, Norman Barnett (1974). "Wonnarua (NSW)". Aboriginal Tribes of Australia: Their Terrain, Environmental Controls, Distribution, Limits, and Proper Names. Australian National University Press. ISBN 978-0-708-10741-6.
- Wafer, Jim (2014). "Placenames as a guide to language distribution in the Upper Hunter, and the landnám problem in Australian toponomastics". In Clark, Ian D.; Hercus, Luise; Kostanski, Laura (eds.). Indigenous and Minority Placenames Australian and International Perspectives. Australilan National University. pp. 57–82. ISBN 9781925021622. JSTOR j.ctt13www5z.7.
- Wafer, Jim; Lissarrague, Amanda (2008). A Handbook of Aboriginal Languages of New South Wales and the Australian Capital Territory. Nambucca Heads, NSW: Muurrbay Aboriginal Language and Culture Co-operative. ISBN 978-0-977-53518-7.
