= City of Maitland =

- Local government area
- Location in Greater Newcastle

- Interactive map of City of Maitland
- Coordinates: 32°45′S 151°35′E
- Country: Australia
- State: New South Wales
- Region: Hunter (Greater Newcastle)
- City: Maitland
- Council seat: Maitland

Government
  - Mayor: Philip Penfold (Independent)
  - State electorate: Maitland
  - Federal divisions: Paterson; Lyne

Area
  - Total: 392 km^{2} (151 sq mi)

Population
  - Total: 90,226 (2021 census)
  - Density: 230.17/km^{2} (596.1/sq mi)
- Time zone: UTC+10 (AEST)
  - Summer (DST): UTC+11 (AEDT)
- Website: www.maitland.nsw.gov.auCity of Maitland
LGAs around City of Maitland
Singleton	Dungog	Dungog
Singleton	City of Maitland	Port Stephens
Cessnock	Lake Macquarie	Newcastle

The City of Maitland is a local government area in the lower Hunter region of New South Wales, Australia. The area is situated adjacent to the New England Highway and the Hunter railway line.

The mayor of the City of Maitland is Philip Penfold, a former Liberal party member turned Independent politician.

The deputy mayor of the City of Maitland is Cr. Sally Sally Halliday, a member of the Liberal Party.

The current General Manager is Jeff Smith.

== History ==
Before 1944, the Maitland area was governed by three separate municipalities; West Maitland, East Maitland, and Morpeth. In July 1944, these municipalities (along with parts of nearby shires such as Bolwarra, Tarro and Kearsley) were amalgamated to form the Municipality of Maitland.

=== Council dismissal ===
In 1997 Maitland City Council was dismissed after an inquiry into governance problems within the council. The Department of Local Government conducted public hearings in Maitland between August and September 1997, with councillors, council staff and members of the public. The inquiry's findings led the Minister for Local Government to recommend that the offices of the Mayor and all councillors be declared vacant.

Following the dismissal, the Governor appointed an Administrator to run the council's affairs. The Administrator remained in that role until the next scheduled local government elections in September 1999, effectively placing Maitland under administrative management rather than elected council control for nearly two years.

=== Proposed amalgamation ===
A 2015 review of local government boundaries by the NSW Government Independent Pricing and Regulatory Tribunal recommended the merger of a number of adjoining councils. In the initial proposal, the City of Maitland was not included in any amalgamation proposals. However, following the lodging of an alternate proposal by Mid-Coast Council Council to amalgamate the Gloucester, Great Lakes and Greater Taree councils, the NSW Minister for Local Government proposed a merger between the Dungog Shire with the City of Maitland. In February 2017, the NSW Government announced that it will not proceed with the proposed amalgamation.

=== Proposed Walka Water Works holiday park ===
Walka Water Works is a heritage-listed 19th-century pumping station located in Maitland. Originally built in 1887 to supply water to Newcastle and the lower Hunter Valley, it has since been restored and preserved and is part of Maitland City Council's Walka Recreation and Wildlife Reserve.

In 2022, Maitland City Council partnered with Reflections Holiday Parks and Crown Lands on a plan to transform part of the heritage‑listed site, into a holiday park and tourism destination. This would include caravan sites, eco‑cabins and glamping sites. This plan was deeply controversial, with many residents against the planned development. However, detailed studies of the site revealed asbestos contamination across the site. Maitland City Council chose in early 2024 to reprioritise the funding toward safety and remediation work rather than immediate development. This led Reflections Holidays Parks to withdraw from the project.

=== Maitland Gaol management ===
Maitland Gaol is a historic former prison located in East Maitland, New South Wales. Opened in 1848, it operated for over 150 years before closing in 1998. Maitland City Council took over management of the site in 2001, after the prison had closed as a correctional facility in 1998, and the state government sought a new use for the heritage‑listed property.The council operated the site as a tourist attraction, including as a live music venue. In 2024, Maitland City Council pushed forward for site to be redeveloped to become boutique accommodation. However, in 2025 Maitland City Council decided to return management of the gaol to the NSW Government, citing the project as financially unsustainable.

=== Art Gallery intervention controversy ===
The Jocko Graves statue, a lawn jockey depicting an African American boy located on High Street and colloquially known as the "Little Black Boy", has been the subject of public debate. The statue arrived in Maitland in the 19th century and has been relocated several times, stolen, and damaged when it was struck by a truck. The statue is listed as a local heritage item.

In 2026, concerns were raised about the politicisation of the statue by Maitland City Council following its response to an art exhibition examining the Jocko Graves statue's history. Maitland Regional Art Gallery hosted an exhibition by artist Osvaldo Budet examining the history and racial context of the statue. At the direction of the mayor, Maitland City Council erected a sign outside the exhibition stating that visitors may find the exhibition offensive and that the council did not share the views expressed by the artist. The sign was criticised by Budet who argued that it undermined artistic expression and the exhibition's interpretation of the statue. The council subsequently passed a resolution expressing disappointment with the exhibition, describing it as primarily a political statement rather than an exhibition of art, while reaffirming its support for the continued retention of the Jocko Graves statue.

== Demographics ==
At the 2011 census, there were 67,478 people in the City of Maitland local government area, of these 48.9 per cent were male and 51.1 per cent were female. Aboriginal and Torres Strait Islander people made up 3.5 per cent of the population, which was higher than the national and state averages of 2.5 per cent. The median age of people in the City of Maitland was 36 years, which was marginally lower than the national median of 37 years. Children aged 0–14 years made up 22.0 per cent of the population and people aged 65 years and over made up 12.7 per cent of the population. Of people in the area aged 15 years and over, 50.9 per cent were married and 11.8 per cent were either divorced or separated.

Population growth in the City of Maitland between the 2001 census and the 2006 census was 15.19 per cent; and in the subsequent five years to the 2011 census, population growth was 9.05 per cent. When compared with total population growth of Australia for the same periods, being 5.78 per cent and 8.32 per cent respectively, population growth in the City of Maitland local government area was significantly higher than the national average. The median weekly income for residents within the City of Maitland was approximately equal to the national average.

At the 2011 census, the proportion of residents in the City of Maitland local government area who stated their ancestry as Australian or Anglo-Celtic exceeded 82 per cent of all residents (national average was 65.2 per cent). In excess of 67% of all residents in the City of Maitland nominated a religious affiliation with Christianity at the 2011 census, which was significantly higher than the national average of 50.2 per cent. Meanwhile, as at the census date, compared to the national average, households in the City of Maitland local government area had a significantly lower than average proportion (4.7 per cent) where two or more languages are spoken (national average was 20.4 per cent); and a significantly higher proportion (93.2 per cent) where English only was spoken at home (national average was 76.8 per cent).

Selected historical census data for the City of Maitland local government area
Census year		2001	2006	2011	2016
Population	Estimated residents on Census night	53,718	61,880	67,478	77,305
Population	LGA rank in terms of size within New South Wales				29th
Population	% of New South Wales population		0.98%	0.98%	▲1.03%
Population	% of Australian population	0.29%	▲0.31%	0.31%	▲0.33%
Cultural and language diversity					
Ancestry, top responses	Australian			35.0%	▼33.0%
Ancestry, top responses	English			32.1%	▼31.8%
Ancestry, top responses	Irish			8.2%	▲8.9%
Ancestry, top responses	Scottish			7.1%	▲7.8%
Ancestry, top responses	German			3.6%	▼3.4%
Language, top responses (other than English)	Cantonese	0.3%	▼0.2%	0.2%	0.2%
Language, top responses (other than English)	Afrikaans	n/c	n/c	▲0.2%	0.2%
Language, top responses (other than English)	Tagalog	0.1%	▼ n/c	▲0.1%	▲0.2%
Language, top responses (other than English)	Mandarin				0.2%
Language, top responses (other than English)	Malay				0.2%
Language, top responses (other than English)	German	0.2%	0.2%	0.2%	
Language, top responses (other than English)	Polish	0.3%	▼0.2%	0.2%	
Religious affiliation					
Religious affiliation, top responses	Catholic	30.3%	▼29.4%	▼28.9%	▼26.6%
Religious affiliation, top responses	Anglican	32.1%	▼30.2%	▼28.9%	▼24.1%
Religious affiliation, top responses	No Religion	9.1%	▲12.0%	▲15.8%	▲24.0%
Religious affiliation, top responses	Uniting Church	8.3%	▼7.1%	▼6.4%	▼4.9%
Religious affiliation, top responses	Presbyterian and Reformed	4.4%	▼4.1%	▼3.7%	
Median weekly incomes					
Personal income	Median weekly personal income		A$428	A$562	A$644
Personal income	% of Australian median income		91.8%	▲97.4%	▼97.3%
Family income	Median weekly family income		A$1,159	A$1,664	A$1,555
Family income	% of Australian median income		99.0%	▲105.0%	▼96.0%
Household income	Median weekly household income		A$1,025	A$1,292	A$1,415
Household income	% of Australian median income		99.8%	▲104.7%	▼98.4%

== Council ==
=== 2024 election ===
In the lead up to the 2024 local government elections in NSW, the NSW Liberal Party failed to lodge candidate nominations by the official deadline, preventing it from contesting certain wards and the mayoral election. Liberal Councillor and Deputy Mayor Mitchell Griffin re‑nominated as an independent just before the deadline closed. While other preselected Liberal candidates, such as Michael Cooper and Councillor Ben Mitchell, were unable to appear on the ballot. Councillor Sally Halliday was among the few in the state whose nomination was successfully submitted.

The result of the election delivered a successful landslide victory for Mayor Penfold and his Independent team, delivering them total control of the council chamber. Mayor Penfold also secured a 21% first-preference swing towards him as well as a two-candidate preferred result of nearly 63%.

Following his successful re-election, in 2025 Mayor Penfold attempted to contest the Division of Paterson in that year's federal election. During the election, Mayor Penfold claimed he would serve as Mayor and Federal Member if he won the seat. He was unsuccessful, gaining only 9% of the vote.

=== Current composition and election method ===
Maitland City Council is composed of thirteen councillors, including the mayor, for a fixed four-year term of office. The mayor is directly elected while the twelve other Councillors are elected proportionally as four separate wards, each electing three councillors. The most recent election was held on 14 September 2024, and the makeup of the council, including the mayor, is as follows.

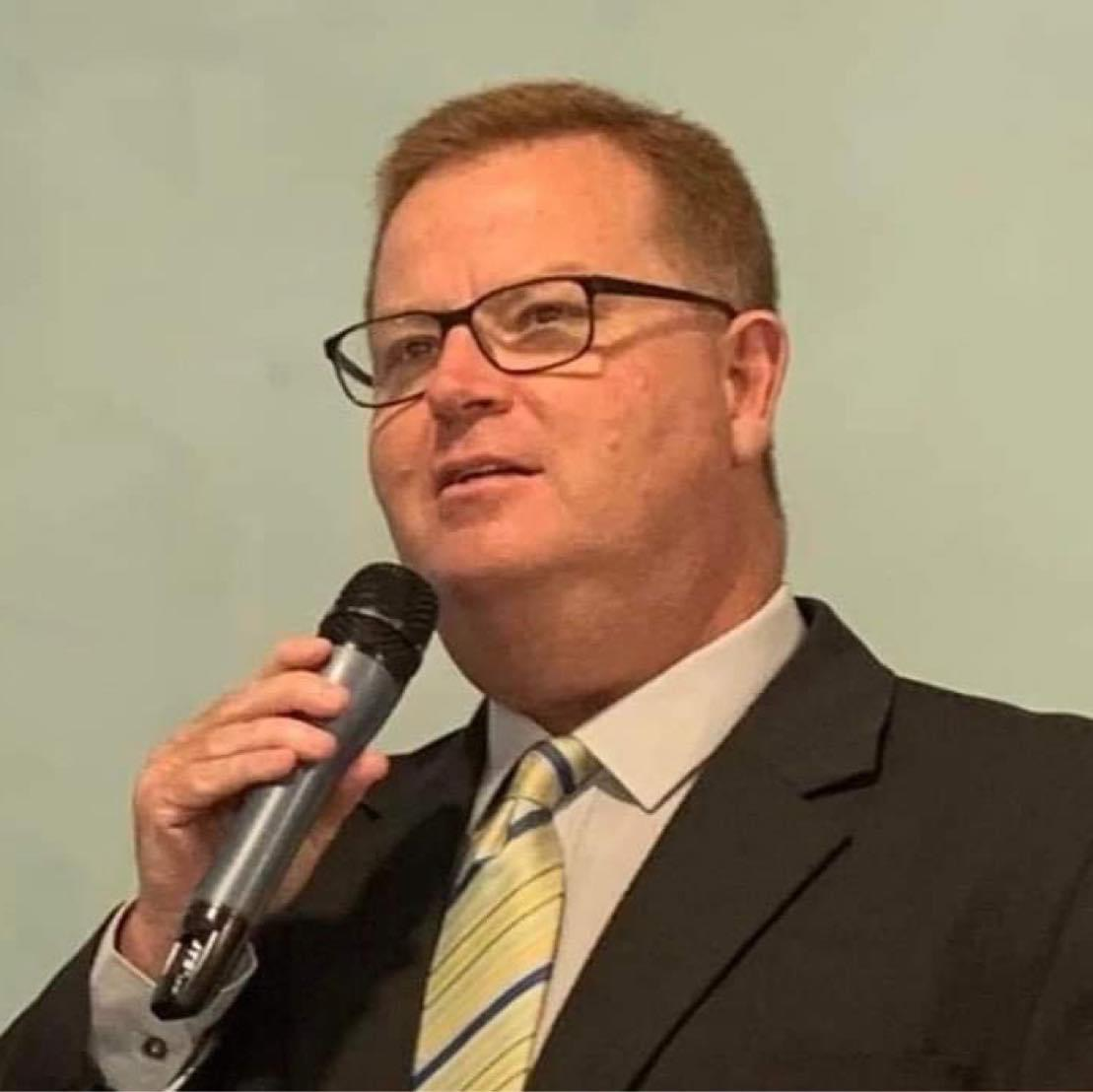
Mayor Philip Penfold, Mayor of Maitland

Party	Councillors
Penfold Independents	7
Labor	4
Liberal	1
Independent Liberal	1
Total	13

The council consists of the following:

Ward	Councillor	Party	Notes
Mayor	Philip Penfold	Penfold Independents	First elected 2008, as a member of the Liberal party.
Central Ward (Now Ward 1)	Sally Halliday	Liberal	First elected 2017
Central Ward (Now Ward 1)	Amelia Atkinson	Labor	First elected 2024
Central Ward (Now Ward 1)	Ken Jordan	Penfold Independents	First elected 2024, previously a Liberal Councillor on Port Stephens Council.
East Ward (Now Ward 3)	Ben Whiting	Labor	First elected 2012
East Ward (Now Ward 3)	Bill Hackney	Penfold Independents	First elected 2021
East Ward (Now Ward 3)	Ben Worth	Penfold Independents	First elected 2024
North Ward (Now Ward 2)	Mitchell Griffin	Independent Liberal	First elected 2017
North Ward (Now Ward 2)	Kristy Flannery	Penfold Independents	First elected 2021
North Ward (Now Ward 2)	Race Barstow	Labor	First elected 2024
West Ward (Now Ward 4)	Don Ferris	Labor	First term 2017–2021 Re-elected 2024
West Ward (Now Ward 4)	Mike Yarrington	Penfold Independents	First elected 2017
West Ward (Now Ward 4)	Warrick Penfold	Penfold Independents	First elected 2024

== Election results ==
=== 2024 ===
2024 New South Wales local elections: Maitland
Party	Votes	%	Swing	Seats	Change
Penfold Independents	22,450	40.7	+12.7	6	▲2
Labor	19,199	34.8	−2.9	4	Steady
Liberal	3,141	5.7	−17.6	1	▼3
Independent Liberal	2,478	4.5	+4.5	1	▲1
Greens	6,388	11.6	+6.3	0	Steady
Independent National	1,501	2.7	+2.7	0	Steady
Independents	65	0.1	-6.1	0	Steady
Formal votes	55,222	92.7			
Informal votes	4,322	7.3			
Total	59,544	100.0			
Registered voters / turnout	69,121	86.1			

== List of Mayors ==
Before the Municipality of Maitland incorporated in 1944, the city was divided into West Maitland, East Maitland and Morpeth, each with its own mayor.

=== Mayors of Maitland since 1945 ===
#	Name	Term Start	Term End	Time in Office	Party/Affiliation	Notes
1	JV Kennedy	1945	1945	1 year		
2	Henry T Skilton	1946	1947	2 years		
3	F O Fahey	1948	1949	2 years		
4	Alexander S McDonald	1950	1950	1 year		
5	J Harvey	1951	1952	2 years		
6	M J Clyde	1953	1953	1 year		
(3)	F O Fahey	1954	1954	1 year		
7	Alexander S McDonald OBE	1955	1956	2 years		
(2)	Henry T Skilton	1957	1965	9 years		
8	W J Harvey	1966	1967	2 years		
9	James G Wolstenholme	1968	1968	1 Year		
(8)	W J Harvey	1969	1969	1 Year		
10	Walter R Walsh	1970	1972	3 years		
11	Noel V Unicomb	1973	1978	6 years		
(10)	Walter R Walsh	1979	1983	5 years		
12	Kenneth W Guy	1984	1985	2 years		
13	Patrick J Hughes	1986	1986	1 year		
14	Peter Blackmore	1986	1990	5 years	Independent	Member for Maitland 1991–1999 Councillor 1980, 1990, 1999–2017
15	Ray Fairweather	1990	1990	1 year	Labor	Councillor 1977–2012
16	Graham Dunkley	1991	1991	1 year		Councillor 1987–1993
17	Robert Gee	1992	1993	2 years		Councillor 1980–1995
18	John Martin	1994	September 1997	3 years, 255 days		Councillor 1987–1997
19	Henry Meskauskas	September 1997	12 Nov 1997	30 days	Labor	Councillor 1987–2021
n/a	Council dismissed	12 November 1997	11 September 1999	1 year, 303 days	Administrator	Administrator Ron Eagle
(14)	Peter Blackmore	11 September 1999	9 September 2017	17 years, 363 days	Independent	Member for Maitland 1991–1999 Councillor 1980, 1990, 1999–2017
20	Loretta Baker	9 September 2017	4 December 2021	4 years, 86 days	Labor	Councillor 2008–2024
21	Philip Penfold	4 December 2021	Incumbent	4 years, 341 days	Penfold Independents	Councillor since 2008

=== Deputy mayors of Maitland since 2016 ===
Maitland City Council elects its Deputy Mayor from the sitting councillors rather than through a public vote. Typically, the election occurs at the council's annual meeting, which is held each September, the term of office usually lasts for 12 months, although a councillor may be re-elected to the position in subsequent years. A Deputy Mayor can exercise any function of the Mayor at the request of the Mayor. The position isn't required by legislation and is created at the discretion of the council.

Name	Term Start	Term End	Time in Office	Party/Affiliation	Notes
Ken Wethered	27 September 2016	26 September 2017	365 days	Independent	Councillor 2008–2017
Sally Halliday	26 September 2017	22 September 2018	362 days	Liberal	Councillor since 2017
Mitchell Griffin	25 September 2018	24 September 2019	365 days	Liberal	Councillor since 2017
Philip Penfold	24 September 2019	22 September 2020	365 days	Penfold Independents	Councillor since 2008
Ben Mitchell	22 September 2020	28 September 2021	1 year and 7 days	Liberal	Councillor 2017–2024
Henry Meskauskas	28 September 2021	25 January 2022	120 days	Labor	Councillor 1987–2021
Mitchell Griffin	25 January 2022	22 October 2024	2 years and 272 days	Liberal	Councillor since 2017Deputy mayor (2018–2019)
Bill Hackney	22 October 2024	16 September 2025	329 days	Penfold Independents	Councillor since 2021
Mike Yarrington	16 September 2025	15 September 2026	364 days	Penfold Independents	Councillor since 2017
Sally Halliday	15 September 2026	Incumbent	56 days	Liberal	Councillor since 2017 Deputy mayor (2017–2018)
