= List of road routes in New South Wales =

New South Wales

Road routes in New South Wales assist drivers navigating roads in urban, rural, and scenic areas of the state. Today all numbered routes in the state are allocated a letter (M, A, B or D) in addition to a one- or -two digit number, with 'M' routes denoting motorways, 'A' routes denoting routes of national significance, 'B' routes denoting routes of state significance, and 'D' for Detour routes of a major motorway. The route system includes the officially designated highways, urban and intercity motorways and arterial roads, and important cross-state roads that have not been declared highways.

== History ==
Route numbers have been allocated to New South Wales' roads since 1954, with the introduction of National Routes across all states and territories in Australia, symbolised by a white shield with black writing; National Route 1 ('Highway 1') was one of the best-known numbered nation routes, likely due to its fame for circumnavigating the continent.

To supplement the National Route number system, three Ring Roads were introduced to Sydney in 1964, symbolised by a blue circular shield with white writing and a dotted outline. These lasted 10 years before their decommissioning in 1974.

In 1973 Freeway Routes were introduced to complement the state's National Routes and Sydney's Ring Roads, symbolised by blue rounded shields with white writing crowned by red crests as well, in an imitation of the American Interstate shield. Most of these routes were not signed as extensions opened, or were replaced with other routes in the years following, and while not officially decommissioned, virtually all signage of these routes were removed in 1992.

In 1974 the National Highway network was defined, which allowed some existing National Routes to be upgraded to National Highways. These were marked with the same shield design as the National Routes, except for their gold-on-green colouring and the word NATIONAL added across the top. The new State Routes system was also introduced in 1974, symbolised by blue rounded shields with white writing – much like the Freeway Routes, except without the red crests – and replaced Sydney's Ring Roads. Scores of other State Routes were designated across New South Wales, marking out urban arterial routes and secondary rural highways.

In 1992–1993 Sydney's Metroad system was introduced, symbolised by white hexagonal shields with blue writing, indicating Sydney's major radial and circumferential arteries. These routes subsumed many of the city's existing State Routes and also urban portions of National Routes and National Highways. A second, smaller allocation of Metroads were rolled out in 1998–9.

In 2013 the state replaced its entire system of National Routes, National Highways and Metroads with an alphanumeric route numbering system. Many existing numbered routes were allocated a letter (M, A, B or D) in addition to its number, with 'M' routes denoting motorways, 'A' routes denoting routes of national significance, 'B' routes denoting routes of state significance, and 'D' routes acting as motorway detours. Instead of shields, route numbers are displayed as yellow text on green rectangular backgrounds outlined in white, and has now – with the exception of Tourist Routes and a State Route or two – become the sole route numbering system in the state. The changeover to alphanumeric routes was announced in March 2013 and signs were updated between May and December 2013, either by removing old "shield" coverplates installed on newer signs, or installing new alphanumeric coverplates on old shielded signs, although some road projects (like Westlink M7 in 2005) or major highways (like Hume Highway from 1997) were allocated or converted to alphanumeric routes before the general change-over in 2013; these are noted. In 2020, the styling of the markers was modified to remove the white border, aligning with the design for all other states and territories except the ACT.

== Alphanumeric routes ==
=== M routes ===
Transport for NSW define M routes as "motorway standard roads". In practice, this means roads allocated an M route are usually at least dual-carriageway motorways or high standard rural highways with at least two lanes in each direction. Unlike other states, New South Wales route allocations do not use a different background colour to designate a toll-road: routes attracting a toll are specifically marked.

Route	Component roads	From	Via	To	Length	Notes
M1	Pacific Motorway	NSW/QLD border	Cobaki Lakes; Tweed Heads; Bangalow; West Ballina	Woodburn	127 km (79 mi)	Highway 1 route: – continues north as along Pacific Motorway into QLD eventually to Eight Mile Plains – continues south as along Pacific Highway to Beresfield Note: uncertainty still exists over which parts are officially classified Pacific Motorway or Pacific Highway
M1	Pacific Motorway	Woombah		Glenugie	62 km (39 mi)	Highway 1 route: – continues north as along Pacific Motorway into QLD eventually to Eight Mile Plains – continues south as along Pacific Highway to Beresfield Note: uncertainty still exists over which parts are officially classified Pacific Motorway or Pacific Highway
M1	Pacific Motorway	Dirty Creek		Korora	35 km (22 mi)	Highway 1 route: – continues north as along Pacific Motorway into QLD eventually to Eight Mile Plains – continues south as along Pacific Highway to Beresfield Note: uncertainty still exists over which parts are officially classified Pacific Motorway or Pacific Highway
M1	Pacific Motorway	Raleigh		Warrell Creek	42 km (26 mi)	Highway 1 route: – continues north as along Pacific Motorway into QLD eventually to Eight Mile Plains – continues south as along Pacific Highway to Beresfield Note: uncertainty still exists over which parts are officially classified Pacific Motorway or Pacific Highway
M1	Pacific Motorway	Eungai Creek		Thrumster	79 km (49 mi)	Highway 1 route: – continues north as along Pacific Motorway into QLD eventually to Eight Mile Plains – continues south as along Pacific Highway to Beresfield Note: uncertainty still exists over which parts are officially classified Pacific Motorway or Pacific Highway
M1	Pacific Motorway	Beresfield	Morisset; Tuggerah; Mooney Mooney; Berowra	Wahroonga	127 km (79 mi)	Highway 1 route: – continues north as along Pacific Highway to Thrumster – continues south as along Pacific Highway to Artarmon
M1	Gore Hill Freeway; Warringah Freeway; Sydney Harbour Tunnel; Cahill Expressway; Eastern Distributor; Southern Cross Drive; General Holmes Drive	Artarmon	North Sydney; Darlinghurst; Zetland	Mascot	62 km (39 mi)	Highway 1 route through Sydney: – continues north as along Pacific Highway to Wahroonga – continues south as along General Holmes Drive to Waterfall – tolled on Sydney Harbour Tunnel (southbound only), Eastern Distributor and Military Road E-ramp.
M1	Princes Motorway	Waterfall	Helensburgh; Thirroul; Mount Pleasant; West Wollongong	Oak Flats	63 km (39 mi)	Highway 1 route: – continues north as along Princes Highway to Mascot – continues south as along Princes Highway to NSW/VIC border
M2	M2 Hills Motorway; Lane Cove Tunnel	Baulkham Hills	Epping; North Ryde	Artarmon	25 km (16 mi)	– continues north as along (Old) Windsor Road to Windsor – tolled
M4	M4 Western Motorway; WestConnex M4	Lapstone	Penrith; Prospect; Parramatta; Strathfield	Rozelle	55 km (34 mi)	– continues east as along the Anzac Bridge to Sydney – eastern end extended from Strathfield to Haberfield when it opened in 2019, and once again to Rozelle in 2023 – tolled east of the Church St exit at Parramatta
M5	M5 South-West Motorway; M5 East Motorway	Prestons	Moorebank; Beverly Hills; Arncliffe	Mascot	29 km (18 mi)	Tolled separately between Moorebank and Beverly Hills (M5 South-West), and on M5 East
M7	Westlink M7	Prestons	Rooty Hill; Horsley Park	Baulkham Hills	40 km (25 mi)	– allocated upon opening in 2005 – tolled
M8	WestConnex M8	Beverly Hills	Arncliffe St Peters	Rozelle	15 km (9 mi)	– allocated upon opening in 2020 – tolled – Extended to Leichhardt as part of the M4-M8 link in January 2023 and once again to Rozelle in November 2023
M11	NorthConnex	Wahroonga		West Pennant Hills	9 km (6 mi)	– allocated in August 2023 – tolled
M12	M12 Motorway (Sydney)	Westlink M7, Cecil Hills	Western Sydney Airport	Northern Road, Luddenham	14 km (9 mi)	– route number used in government planning documents
M15	Hunter Expressway	Lower Belford	Branxton; Heddon Greta	Cameron Park	26 km (16 mi)	– allocated upon opening in 2014 – continues north as along New England Highway to NSW/QLD border – continues east as along Newcastle Link Road to Newcastle
M23	Federal Highway	Yarra	Collector; Sutton	NSW/ACT border	55 km (34 mi)	Continues west as along Federal Highway into ACT eventually to Majura
M31	Hume Motorway; Hume Highway	Prestons	Campbelltown; Aylmerton; Yarra; Yass; Tarcutta; Table Top; Albury	NSW/VIC border	513 km (319 mi)	Continues south as along Hume Freeway into VIC eventually to Melbourne

=== A routes ===
Transport for NSW define A routes as "routes of national significance". A routes are numbered between 1–49.

Route	Component roads	From	Via	To	Length	Notes
A1	Pacific Highway	Woodburn		Woombah	34 km (21 mi)	Highway 1 route: – continues north as along Pacific Motorway to NSW/QLD border – continues south as along Pacific Motorway to Thrumster Note: uncertainty still exists over which parts are officially classified Pacific Motorway or Pacific Highway
A1	Pacific Highway	Glenugie		Dirty Creek	25 km (16 mi)	Highway 1 route: – continues north as along Pacific Motorway to NSW/QLD border – continues south as along Pacific Motorway to Thrumster Note: uncertainty still exists over which parts are officially classified Pacific Motorway or Pacific Highway
A1	Pacific Highway	Korora		Raleigh	29 km (18 mi)	Highway 1 route: – continues north as along Pacific Motorway to NSW/QLD border – continues south as along Pacific Motorway to Thrumster Note: uncertainty still exists over which parts are officially classified Pacific Motorway or Pacific Highway
A1	Pacific Highway	Warrell Creek		Eungai Creek	14 km (9 mi)	Highway 1 route: – continues north as along Pacific Motorway to NSW/QLD border – continues south as along Pacific Motorway to Thrumster Note: uncertainty still exists over which parts are officially classified Pacific Motorway or Pacific Highway
A1	Pacific Highway; New England Highway; John Renshaw Drive	Thrumster	Johns River; Taree; Bulahdelah; Raymond Terrace; Hexham	Beresfield	223 km (139 mi)	Highway 1 route: – continues north as along Pacific Motorway to Eungai Creek – continues south as along Pacific Motorway to Wahroonga – concurrencies: with along New England Highway from Hexham to Beresfield; with along John Renshaw Drive through Beresfield
A1	Pacific Highway	Wahroonga	Pymble; Chatswood	Artarmon	13.5 km (8 mi)	Highway 1 route: – continues north as along Pacific Motorway to Beresfield – continues south as along Gore Hill Freeway to Mascot – concurrency with along Pacific Highway from Roseville to Chatswood
A1	General Holmes Drive; The Grand Parade; President Avenue; Princes Highway	Mascot	Kogarah; Blakehurst; Engadine	Waterfall	32 km (20 mi)	Highway 1 route: – continues north as along General Holmes Drive to Artarmon – continues south as along Princes Motorway to Oak Flats
A1	General Holmes Drive; The Grand Parade; President Avenue; Princes Highway	Oak Flats	Nowra; Batemans Bay; Bega; Eden	NSW/VIC border	415 km (258 mi)	Highway 1 route: – continues north as along Princes Motorway to Waterfall – continues south as along Princes Highway into VIC eventually to Traralgon
A2	Windsor Road; Old Windsor Road	Windsor	Vineyard; Rouse Hill; Bella Vista	Seven Hills	22.8 km (14 mi)	Continues east as along M2 Hills Motorway to North Ryde
A3	Mona Vale Road; Ryde Road; Lane Cove Road; Devlin Street; Church Street; Concord Road; Homebush Bay Drive; Centenary Drive; Wiley Avenue; Roberts Road; King Georges Road	Mona Vale	Pymble; Ryde; Sydney Olympic Park; Greenacre; Beverly Hills	Blakehurst	51 km (32 mi)	
A4	Western Distributor	Rozelle	Pyrmont	Sydney	10.8 km (7 mi)	– continues west as along Western Motorway to Lapstone through the Rozelle Interchange – originally spanned City West Link (now) until extension
A6	Marsden Road; Stewart Street; Silverwater Road; St Hilliers Road; Rawson Street; Boorea Street; Olympic Drive; Joseph Street; Rookwood Road; Stacey Street; Fairford Road; Davies Road; Alfords Point Road; New Illawarra Road; Heathcote Road	Carlingford	Silverwater; Lidcombe; Bankstown; Menai; Lucas Heights	Heathcote	41 km (25 mi)	
A7	Pennant Hills Road	West Pennant Hills	Pennant Hills	Wahroonga	8.2 km (5 mi)	Not allocated: planned for Pennant Hills Road once NorthConnex opened, but it was believed / concurrency would confuse motorists on which toll to pay: was left as is
A8	Pittwater Road; Condamine Street; Burnt Bridge Creek Deviation; Manly Road; Spit Road; Military Road; Falcon Street	Mona Vale	Narrabeen; Dee Why; The Spit	North Sydney	22.8 km (14 mi)	
A9	George Street; Macquarie Street; Richmond Road; The Northern Road (I); Richmond Road; Parker Street; The Northern Road (II); Narellan Road	Windsor	South Windsor; Luddenham; Bringelly; Narellan	Campbelltown	63 km (39 mi)	
A11	Pacific Highway	Wahroonga	Pymble; Chatswood	Artarmon	13.8 km (8.6 mi)	Partially allocated, halted after NorthConnex opened in 2020, then decommissioned; some signs were converted to but changed back to
A15	New England Highway	NSW/QLD border	Tenterfield; Glen Innes; Armidale; Bendemeer; Tamworth; Muswellbrook; Singleton	Lower Belford	540 km (336 mi)	– continues north as along New England Highway into QLD eventually to Redbank – continues east as along Hunter Expressway to Cameron Park – concurrency with along Oxley Highway from Bendemeer to Tamworth
A15	Newcastle Link Road; Thomas Street; Newcastle Road; Griffiths Road; Donald Street; Parry Street	Cameron Park	Jesmond; Lambton	Newcastle West	16.4 km (10 mi)	– allocation rerouted from New England Highway, Pacific Highway and Industrial Drive (replaced by) to current route (replacing) when Hunter Expressway opened in 2014 – continues west as along Hunter Expressway to Lower Belford – concurrency with along Newcastle Road from Jesmond to Lambton
A20	Sturt Highway	NSW/VIC border	Buronga; Balranald; Hay South; Darlington Point; Narrandera; Wagga Wagga	Tarcutta	597 km (371 mi)	– continues west as along Sturt Highway into VIC via Mildura, and into SA eventually to Adelaide – concurrency with along Olympic Highway from Moorong to Wagga Wagga
A22	Hume Highway; Parramatta Road	Liverpool	Yagoona; Enfield; Haberfield	Ultimo	31 km (19 mi)	
A25	Barton Highway	Yass	Murrumbateman	NSW/ACT border	40 km (25 mi)	Continues south as along Barton Highway into ACT eventually to Canberra
A28	Camden Valley Way; Hume Highway; Cumberland Highway	Edmondson Park	Liverpool; Smithfield; North Parramatta; Carlingford; Pennant Hills	Wahroonga	41 km (25 mi)	Concurrency with along Old Windsor Road, Briens Road and James Ruse Drive from Northmead to North Parramatta
A31	Hume Highway	Berrima	Yass; Tarcutta; Table Top; Albury	NSW/VIC border	431 km (268 mi)	Decommissioned: signage along Hume Highway (from Berrima to the border) progressively allocated from 1997 as it wasn't a gazetted motorway; however, classification for M routes changed by the time Holbrook bypass opened, replaced by in 2013
A32	Barrier Highway; Mitchell Highway; Great Western Highway	NSW/SA border	Broken Hill; Wilcannia; Cobar; Nyngan; Dubbo; Orange; Bathurst; Lithgow	Lapstone	1,146 km (712 mi)	Continues west as along Barrier Highway into SA eventually to Gawler
A34	Macquarie Street; Terminus Street; Newbridge Road; Milperra Road; (New) Canterbury Road; Stanmore Road; Enmore Road	Liverpool	Milperra; Petersham	Newtown	26 km (16 mi)	
A36	Princes Highway	Ultimo	Newtown; Arncliffe	Kogarah	11.3 km (7 mi)	
A37	Newcastle Inner City Bypass (I); Newcastle Road; Croudace Street; Lookout Road; Charlestown Road; Newcastle Inner City Bypass (II)	Sandgate	Jesmond; Lambton	Bennetts Green	16.4 km (10 mi)	– re-aligned through Shortland from Sandgate/Wallsend Roads to current alignment when second northern section of Newcastle Inner City Bypass opened in 2014 – concurrency with along Newcastle Road from Jesmond to Lambton
A38	Delhi Road; Millwood Avenue; Fullers Road; Pacific Highway; Boundary Street; Babbage Road; Warringah Road	North Ryde	Chatswood; Forestville	Dee Why	17.8 km (11 mi)	Concurrency with along Pacific Highway from Chatswood to Roseville
A39	Newell Highway	NSW/QLD border	Moree; Narrabri; Coonabarabran; Gilgandra; Dubbo; Parkes; West Wyalong; Narrandera; Finley; Tocumwal	NSW/VIC border	1,057 km (657 mi)	– continues north as along Gore Highway into QLD eventually to Toowoomba – continues south as along Goulburn Valley Highway into VIC eventually to Shepparton – concurrencies: with along Mid Western Highway from Caragabal to West Wyalong; with along Burley Griffin Way from Beckom to Ardlethan
A40	Old Windsor Road; Briens Road; James Ruse Drive; Victoria Road	Seven Hills	North Parramatta; Ryde; Drummoyne	Rozelle	27.3 km (17 mi)	Concurrency with along Cumberland Highway from Northmead to North Parramatta
A41	Mid Western Highway; Olympic Highway	Bathurst	Cowra; Young; Cootamundra; Junee; Wagga Wagga	Table Top	422 km (262 mi)	Concurrency with along Sturt Highway from Wagga Wagga to Moorong
A43	New England Highway; Pacific Highway (I); Industrial Drive; Hannell Street; Stewart Avenue; Pacific Highway (II); Doyalson Link Road	Greta	Maitland; Beresfield; Hexham; Newcastle West; Bennetts Green; Swansea; Doyalson	Halloran	109 km (68 mi)	Allocation extended west along New England Highway, Pacific Highway and Industrial Drive (replacing) when Hunter Expressway opened in 2014
A44	Russell Street; Great Western Highway; Wattle Street; Dobroyd Parade	Emu Plains	Penrith; St Marys; Parramatta; Auburn; Strathfield	Haberfield	50 km (31 mi)	– eastern end extended along Parramatta Road and Wattle Street from Strathfield to Haberfield (replacing) when M4 East motorway opened in 2019 – to be extended further east (currently replacing) as stages of the M4 East motorway project are completed
A46	Newcastle Link Road; Thomas Street; Newcastle Road; Griffiths Road; Donald Street; Parry Street	Cameron Park	Jesmond; Lambton	Newcastle West	16.4 km (10 mi)	Decommissioned, allocation replaced by when Hunter Expressway opened in 2014
A48	Illawarra Highway	Sutton Forest	Moss Vale; Robertson	Albion Park	61 km (38 mi)	
A49	Central Coast Highway	Doyalson	Noraville; The Entrance; Gosford	Kariong	50 km (31 mi)	
Decommissioned or unsigned allocation

=== B routes ===
Transport for NSW define B routes as "routes of state significance". B routes are numbered between 51 and 99, with the sole exception of Monaro Highway (allocated to remain consistent across state lines).

Route	Component roads	From	Via	To	Length	Notes
B23	Monaro Highway	NSW/ACT border	Michelago; Cooma; Steeple Flat; Bombala	NSW/VIC border	206 km (128 mi)	– continues north as along Monaro Highway into ACT eventually to Fyshwick – continues south as along Monaro Highway into VIC eventually to Cann River – concurrency with along Snowy Mountains Highway from Cooma to Steeple Flat
B51	Kamilaroi Highway	Narrabri	Boggabri; Gunnedah; Quirindi	Willow Tree	188 km (117 mi)	
B52	Canberra Avenue; Farrer Place; Monaro Street; Bungendore Road; Kings Highway	NSW/ACT border	Queanbeyan	NSW/ACT border	12.4 km (8 mi)	– continues west as along Canberra Avenue into ACT eventually to Fyshwick – continues east as along Kings Highway into ACT via Kowen, and back into NSW eventually to Batemans Bay
B52	Kings Highway	NSW/ACT border	Bungendore; Braidwood	Batemans Bay	115 km (71 mi)	Continues west as along Kings Highway into ACT via Kowen, and back into NSW eventually via Queanbeyan
B53	Mandalong Road; Dora Street; Macquarie Street; Main Road (I); Wangi Road; Mount Waring Road; Excelsior Parade; Cary Street; Anzac Parade; Main Road (II); Toronto Road; Five Islands Road; TC Frith Avenue; Lake Road	Morisset	Glendale; Speers Point; Toronto	Wallsend	35 km (22 mi)	
B55	Castlereagh Highway	NSW/QLD border	Walgett; Coonamble; Gilgandra; Dunedoo; Mudgee	Marrangaroo	633 km (393 mi)	Continues north as along Castlereagh Highway into QLD eventually to St George
B56	Oxley Highway	Coonabarabran	Gunnedah; Tamworth; Bendemeer; Walcha	Port Macquarie	446 km (277 mi)	Concurrency with along New England Highway from Tamworth to Bendemeer
B57	The Esplanade; Fairfax Road; Medcalf Street; Hillsborough Road; Charlestown Road	Speers Point		Charlestown	9.5 km (6 mi)	
B58	Riverina Highway	Deniliquin	Finley; Berrigan; Howlong	East Albury	201 km (125 mi)	
B59	Main Street; Lithgow Street; Mort Street; Eddy Street; Chifley Road; Bells Line of Road; Kurrajong Road; March Street; East Market Street; Windsor Street; Hawkesbury Valley Way; Groves Avenue	Lithgow	Bilpin; Kurrajong; Richmond; Windsor	Vineyard	90 km (56 mi)	
B60	Bruxner Highway	Tenterfield	Casino; Lismore	West Ballina	185 km (115 mi)	
B62	Dawson Street; Brunswick Street; Bangalow Road; Lismore Road; Granuaille Road; Hinterland Way	Lismore	Bangalow	Ewingsdale	40 km (25 mi)	
B63	Northcott Drive; Bridges Road; Turton Road; Station Street; Platt Street; Railway Terrace; Hanbury Street; Vine Street; Industrial Drive; Tourle Street; Cormorant Road; Teal Street; Nelson Bay Road; Stockton Street	Adamstown Heights	Mayfield; Kooragang; Williamtown	Nelson Bay	60 km (37 mi)	
B64	Mid-Western Highway	Hay	Goolgowi; West Wyalong; Grenfell	Cowra	413 km (257 mi)	Concurrency with along Newell Highway from West Wyalong to Caragabal
B65	Princes Highway (I); Memorial Drive; Princes Highway (II); Bourke Street; Kembla Street; Corrimal Street; Springhill Road; Five Islands Road; King Street; Primbee Bypass; Windang Road; Shellharbour Road	Thirroul	Bulli; Fairy Meadow; Wollongong; Port Kembla	Shellharbour	39 km (24 mi)	Allocated when extension of Northern Distributor (from Bellambi to Bulli) opened in 2009; Northern Distributor renamed Memorial Drive in 2010
B68	Maitland Road; Cessnock Road; Station Street; First Street; Northcote Street; Mitchell Avenue; Victoria Street; Tarro Street; Mulbring Street; John Renshaw Drive	Cessnock	Kurri Kurri; Buchanan	Beresfield	31 km (19 mi)	Concurrency with along John Renshaw Drive through Beresfield
B69	Narellan Road; Appin Road	Campbelltown	Appin	Cataract	35 km (22 mi)	
B70	Sparks Road; Wallarah Road; Main Road	Halloran		Noraville	14.3 km (9 mi)	
B71	Mitchell Highway	NSW/QLD border	Enngonia; Bourke	Nyngan	339 km (211 mi)	Continues north as along Mitchell Highway into QLD eventually to Augathella
B72	Snowy Mountains Highway	Mount Adrah	Adelong; Tumut; Adaminaby; Cooma; Steeple Flat	Stony Creek	333 km (207 mi)	Concurrency with along Monaro Highway from Cooma to Steeple Flat
B73	Old Hume Highway; Bowral Road; Mittagong Road; Bong Bong Street; Station Street; Funston Street; Kangaloon Road; Sheepwash Road; Nowra Road; Moss Vale Road	Aylmerton	Mittagong; Bowral; Fitzroy Falls	Bomaderry	68 km (42 mi)	
B74	Wyong Road	Mardi		Long Jetty	11.7 km (7 mi)	
B75	Cobb Highway	Wilcannia	Ivanhoe; Hay; Deniliquin; Moama	NSW/VIC border	571 km (355 mi)	Continues south as along Northern Highway into VIC eventually to Wallan
B76	Kamilaroi Highway; Castlereagh Highway; Gwydir Highway; Big River Way	Bourke	Brewarrina; Walgett; Moree; Warialda; Inverell; Glen Innes; South Grafton	Tyndale	843 km (524 mi)	– concurrency with along Castlereagh Highway through Walgett – allocation extended east along Big River Way (former Pacific Highway, replacing) when the Grafton bypass opened in 2020
B78	Waterfall Way	Armidale	Ebor; Dorrigo; Bellingen	Raleigh	170 km (106 mi)	
B79	Silver City Highway	NSW/QLD border	Tibooburra; Milparinka; Broken Hill; Wentworth; Curlwaa	Buronga	582 km (362 mi)	While terminates in NSW in Buronga, allocation continues as along Calder Highway (which branches off at Curlwaa) in VIC eventually to Bendigo
B80	Monaro Highway	Steeple Flat		Bombala	41 km (25 mi)	Not allocated: used instead to remain contiguous with in Victoria
B81	Edward Street; Wellington Street; Peabody Road; The Escort Way; Brown Street; Canowindra Road; Redfern Street; Lachlan Street; Grenfell Road; Lachlan Valley Way	Molong	Cudal; Canowindra; Cowra; Boorowa	Bowning	215 km (134 mi)	
B82	Wine Country Drive; Allandale Road; Vincent Street; Aberdare Road; Greta Street; Caledonia Street; Allandale Street; Lake Road; Leggetts Drive; Freemans Drive	Greta	Cessnock; Kearsley	Cooranbong	50 km (31 mi)	Northern end re-aligned from Clift Street through Branxton to current alignment when Hunter Expressway opened in 2014
B83	Pacific Highway; Wisemans Ferry Road	Wahroonga	Hornsby; Berowra; Mooney Mooney	Somersby	55 km (34 mi)	
B84	Golden Highway	Dubbo	Merriwa; Denman	Whittingham	313 km (194 mi)	
B85	Goldfields Way	Wyalong	Temora	Old Junee	116 km (72 mi)	
B87	Kidman Way	Bourke	Cobar; Mount Hope; Hillston; Goolgowi; Griffith; Darlington Point	Bundure	643 km (400 mi)	
B88	Picton Road	Wilton		Cataract	27 km (17 mi)	
B89	George Booth Drive; Main Road; Macquarie Road; King Street; The Esplanade; Macquarie Drive (I); Bareki Road; Macquarie Drive (II); Croudace Bay Road; Lewers Street; Ross Street; Brooks Parade; Macquarie Street	West Wallsend	Glendale; Warners Bay	Belmont	23 km (14 mi)	
B91	Summerland Way; Big River Way	NSW/QLD border	Kyogle; Casino; South Grafton	Glenugie	212 km (132 mi)	– continues north as along Mount Lindesay Highway into QLD eventually to Brisbane – allocation extended south along Big River Way (former Pacific Highway, replacing) when the Grafton bypass opened in 2020
B94	MacKay Avenue; Burley Griffin Way	Griffith	Ardlethan; Temora; Binalong	Bowning	279 km (173 mi)	Concurrency with along Newell Highway from Ardlethan to Beckom
B95	Fossickers Way	Warialda	Bingara; Manilla	Tamworth	190 km (118 mi)	
Decommissioned or unsigned allocation

=== D routes ===
New South Wales is currently the only state in the country to use D routes, representing detour routes around nominated motorways (when closed or otherwise unusable). To date, there are only two D routes: D1 (routing around the M1 Pacific Motorway through the Central Coast), and D5 (routing around the M5 South-Western Motorway). After Transport for NSW standards changed, all signs now show "D", and there will be no more D routes in NSW.

Route	Component roads	From	Via	To	Length	Notes
D1	Pacific Highway (I); Wisemans Ferry Road; Central Coast Highway; Manns Road; Pacific Highway (II)	Wahroonga	Hornsby; Berowra; Mooney Mooney; Gosford; Tuggerah	Doyalson	98 km (61 mi)	Concurrencies: with along Pacific Highway, Old Pacific Highway and Wisemans Ferry Road from Wahroonga to Somersby; with along Central Coast Highway from Somersby to West Gosford.
D5	King Georges Road; Stoney Creek Road; Forest Road; Wickham Street; West Botany Street; Marsh Street	Beverly Hills	Bexley	Arncliffe	8.4 km (5 mi)	Concurrency with along King Georges Road through Beverly Hills

== Tourist Drives ==
Route	Component Roads	From	Via	To	Length (km)	Notes
Grand Pacific Drive	Audley Road; Sir Bertram Stevens Drive; Lady Wakehurst Drive; Lawrence Hargrave Drive; Memorial Drive	Loftus		Stanwell Park	40 km (25 mi)	
Grand Pacific Drive	Audley Road; Sir Bertram Stevens Drive; Lady Wakehurst Drive; Lawrence Hargrave Drive; Memorial Drive	Stanwell Park		Bulli	17 km (11 mi)	
Grand Pacific Drive	Audley Road; Sir Bertram Stevens Drive; Lady Wakehurst Drive; Lawrence Hargrave Drive; Memorial Drive	Bulli		Fairy Meadow	8 km (5.0 mi)	
Blue Mountains Drive	Leura Mall; Cliff Drive; Echo Point Road; Katoomba Street	Leura		Katoomba	7 km (4.3 mi)	Formerly numbered as until it was rebranded into BMD in 2014. Cliff Drive has been closed since 2020 due to a landslide but is open for pedestrian access.
Tourist Drive 1 Jenolan Caves	Jenolan Caves Road; Edith Road; Ross Street; Carrington Avenue; O'Connell Road; Littlebourne Street	Hartley		Kelso	117 km (73 mi)	Parts of Jenolan Caves Road have been closed since 2021 due to landslides from heavy rain.
Tourist Drive 1 Cooma	Kosciuszko Road; Alpine Way; Swampy Plains Creek Road	Cooma		Cooma	250 km (160 mi)	TD1 was a loop through the Snowy Mountains from the Snowy Mountains Highway/Kosciusko Rd junction near Cooma, via: Jindabyne; Thredbo; Khancoban; Cabramurra to the; SMH at Kianda.
Tourist Drive 1	John Renshaw Parkway; Timor Road	Tooraweena		Coonabarabran	74 km (46 mi)	
Tourist Drive 2	The Bucketts Way	Glenthorne		Twelve Mile Creek	154 km (96 mi)	The second oldest tourist drive in New South Wales.
Tourist Drive 4 Jervis Bay	Jervis Bay Road; Huskisson Road	Falls Creek		Huskisson	11 km (6.8 mi)	
Tourist Drive 4 Inverell	Warialda Road; Yetman Road	Warialda		Inverell	151 km (94 mi)	
Tourist Drive 5	Burrendong Way	Orange	Mullion Creek, Stuart Town, Mumbil	Wellington	83km	
Tourist Drive 6 The Lakes Way – Forster	The Lakes Way	Bulahdelah		Taree	80 km (50 mi)	
Tourist Drive 7 Kangaroo Valley	Kangaroo Valley Road; Moss Vale Road	Berry		Bomaderry	30 km (19 mi)	
Tourist Drive 7 Oracle's Way	Amosfield Road; Mount Lindesay Road; Logan Street; Naas Street; New England Highway; Wallangarra Road	Stanthorpe		Tenterfield, NSW	65 km (40 mi)	Loop route. Enter QLD at Dalcouth.
Tourist Drive 8	Braidwood Road; Bungendore Road	Goulburn		Bywong	85 km (53 mi)	
Tourist Drive 8 Manning Valley	Wingham Road; Bulga Road; Comboyne Road; Oxley Highway	Taree / Wingham		Wauchope	122 km (76 mi)	Partially Unsealed (>35 km)
Tourist Drive 9 Jamberoo	Jamberoo Road; Churchill Street; Jamberoo Mountain Road	Kiama		Robertson	33 km (21 mi)	
Tourist Drive 10 Ocean Drive	Nancy Bird Walton Drive; Ocean Drive; Pacific Drive; Gordon Street; Hastings River Drive	Kew		Port Macquarie	40 km (25 mi)	
Tourist Drive 11 Mount Keira	Cordeaux Road; Harry Graham Drive; Mt Keira Road	Mount Keira		West Wollongong	20 km (12 mi)	
Tourist Drive 12 Picton	Camden Bypass; Old Hume Highway; Remembrance Driveway; Old Hume Highway	Camden		Alpine	58 km (36 mi)	
Tourist Drive 12	Crescent Head Road; Belmore River Bank Road; Macleay Valley Way	Kempsey		South Bellimbopinni	95 km (59 mi)	Circuitous.
Tourist Drive 13 Wombeyan Caves	Taralga Road; Wombeyan Caves Road	Goulburn		Wombeyan Caves	77 km (48 mi)	
Tourist Drive 14 Moss Vale	Old Hume Highway; Bowral Road; Moss Vale Road; Illawarra Highway	Mittagong		Sutton Forrest	28 km (17 mi)	
Tourist Drive 14 & 15 Nambucca Heads	Stuarts Point Road; Grassy Head Road; Scotts Head Road; Giinagay Way	Eungai		Nambucca Heads	TD14: 29 km (18 mi) TD15: 17 km (11 mi)	Route starts at Eungai, designated as TD14, then changes to TD15 at Pacific Highway, ending at Nambucca Heads.
Tourist Drive 15 Fitzroy Falls	Kangaloon Road; Illawarra Highway; Belmore Falls Road; Nowra Road	Bowral		Moss Vale	63 km (39 mi)	
Tourist Drive 16 Bundanoon	Highland Way; Penrose Road; Bundanoon Road; Exeter Road; Illawarra Highway	Goulburn		Sutton Forrest	50 km (31 mi)	
Tourist Drive 16 Bellingen Shire	Giinagay Way; Hungrey Head Road; Bellingen Street	Urunga		Urunga	12 km (7.5 mi)	
Tourist Drive 17 Berrima	Waite Street; Berrima Road; Taylor Avenue; Old Hume Highway	Moss Vale		Mittagong	22 km (14 mi)	
Tourist Drive 17	New England Highway; Guyra-Ebor Road; Waterfall Way	Armidale		Armidale	245 km (152 mi)	Loop route via: Guyra; Ebor; Wollomombi
Tourist Drive 18	Giinagay Way; Keevers Way; Pine Creek Way	Raleigh		Bonville	15 km (9.3 mi)	
Tourist Drive 19	Kentucky Street; Dangarsleigh Road; Dangars Falls Road; Enmore Road; Mihi Road; Gostwyck Road	Armidale	Dangarsleigh; Dangars Gorge; Gostwyck	Uralla	66 km (41 mi)	20 km unsealed.
Tourist Drive 21	Thunderbolts Way; B56 Oxley Highway	Uralla		Bendemmer	138 km (86 mi)	
Tourist Drive 22	Lawrence Road; Yamba Road	Grafton		Yamba	66 km (41 mi)	Involves a free vehicle ferry.
Tourist Drive 24 Bangalow	Dawson Street; Brunswick Street; Bangalow Road; Lismore Road; Granuaille Road; Hinterland Way	Lismore	Bexhill; Clunes; Bangalow	Ewingsdale	40 km (25 mi)	
Tourist Drive 25	Oxley Highway; Duri Road; Werris Creek Road; Whittaker Street; Kamilaroi Highway	Tamworth		Willow Tree	79 km (49 mi)	
Tourist Drive 26 Evans Head	Woodburn–Evans Head Road; Broadwater–Evans Head Road	Woodburn		Broadwater	32 km (20 mi)	
Tourist Drive 27	Golden Highway	Dubbo		Whittingham	314 km (195 mi)	
Tourist Drive 28 Ballina	Wardell Road; Teven Road	Wardell		Knockrow	49 km (30 mi)	
Tourist Drive 30 Byron Bay	The Coast Road; Byron Bay Road; Broken Head Road	Byron Bay		Ballina	32 km (20 mi)	
Tourist Drive 32 Mount Burrell	Terania Street; Nimbin Road; Cullen Street; Blue Knob Road; Nimbin Road; Kyogle Road; Riverview Street	North Lismore		Murwillumbah	78 km (48 mi)	
Tourist Drive 33 Wollombi	Peats Ridge Road; George Downs Drive; Great North Road; Wollombi Road; Wine Country Drive	Calga		Wollombi	68 km (42 mi)	
Tourist Drive 33 Wollombi	Peats Ridge Road; George Downs Drive; Great North Road; Wollombi Road; Wine Country Drive	Wollombi		Cessnock	29.0 km (18.0 mi)	
Tourist Drive 33 Wollombi	Peats Ridge Road; George Downs Drive; Great North Road; Wollombi Road; Wine Country Drive	Cessnock		Branxton	20.1 km (12.5 mi)	
Tourist Drive 34	Queensland Road; Numinbah Road	Murwillumbah		Numinbah	27 km (17 mi)	Northern Terminus at the Queensland Border to continue as State Route 97 to Nerang.
Tourist Drive 36	Tyalgum Road	Byangum		Chillingham	29.1 km (18.1 mi)	
Tourist Drive 38 Tweed Coast Way	Wooyung Road; Tweed Coast Road	Crabbes Creek		Chinderah	32.1 km (19.9 mi)	
Tourist Drive 40 Brunswick Valley	Tweed Valley Way; Brunswick Vally Way	Childerah		Brunswick Valley	48.4 km (30.1 mi)	
Tourist Drive 42 Tomewin	Tomewin Road	Kynnumboon		Tomewin	10.3 km (6.4 mi)	Northern Terminus at the Queensland Border to continue as State Route 98 to Currumbin.

=== Decommissioned Routes ===
Route	Component Roads	From	Via	To	Notes
Hunter Tourist Circuit		Newcastle	Merriwa Taree	Newcastle	Decommissioned, no longer signed Loop Route
Tourist Drive 3 Avon Dam	Old Hume Highway; Avon Dam Road	Picton		Avon Dam	
Tourist Drive 3	Kyogle Road	Kyogle	Homeleigh Cawongla	Kyogle	Loop with multiple routes.
Tourist Drive 8 Bankstown	Henry Lawson Drive; Stoney Creek Road	Milperra		Beverly Hills	
Tourist Drive 9 Parramatta	Church Street; Great Western Highway; Pitt Street; Macquarie Street; O'Connell Street; George Street; Alfred Street; Prospect Street; James Ruse Drive	Parramatta		Parramatta	
Tourist Drive 11 Dural					
Tourist Drive 14 Castlereagh	Mulgoa Road; Castlereagh Road	Penrith	Castlereagh	Richmond	
Tourist Drive 15		Castle Hill			
Tourist Drive 18		Penrith		Camden	
Tourist Drive 1		Tooraweenah	Warrumbungle National Park, Siding Springs Observatory	Coonabarabran	
Tourist Drive 2		Coonabarabran	Bugaldie, Baradine, The Aloes, Kenebri, Rocky Creek Mill, Yarrie Lake	Narrabri	
Tourist Drive 3		Narrabri	Sawn Rocks	Bingara	

== See also ==
- Highways in Australia for highways in other states and territories
- Highways in New South Wales for details about officially gazetted highways
- List of road routes in the Australian Capital Territory
- List of road routes in the Northern Territory
- List of road routes in Queensland
- List of road routes in South Australia
- List of road routes in Tasmania
- List of road routes in Victoria
- List of road routes in Western Australia
