= Pacific Motorway (Sydney–Newcastle) =

Motorway in New South Wales, Australia

Pacific Motorway New South Wales
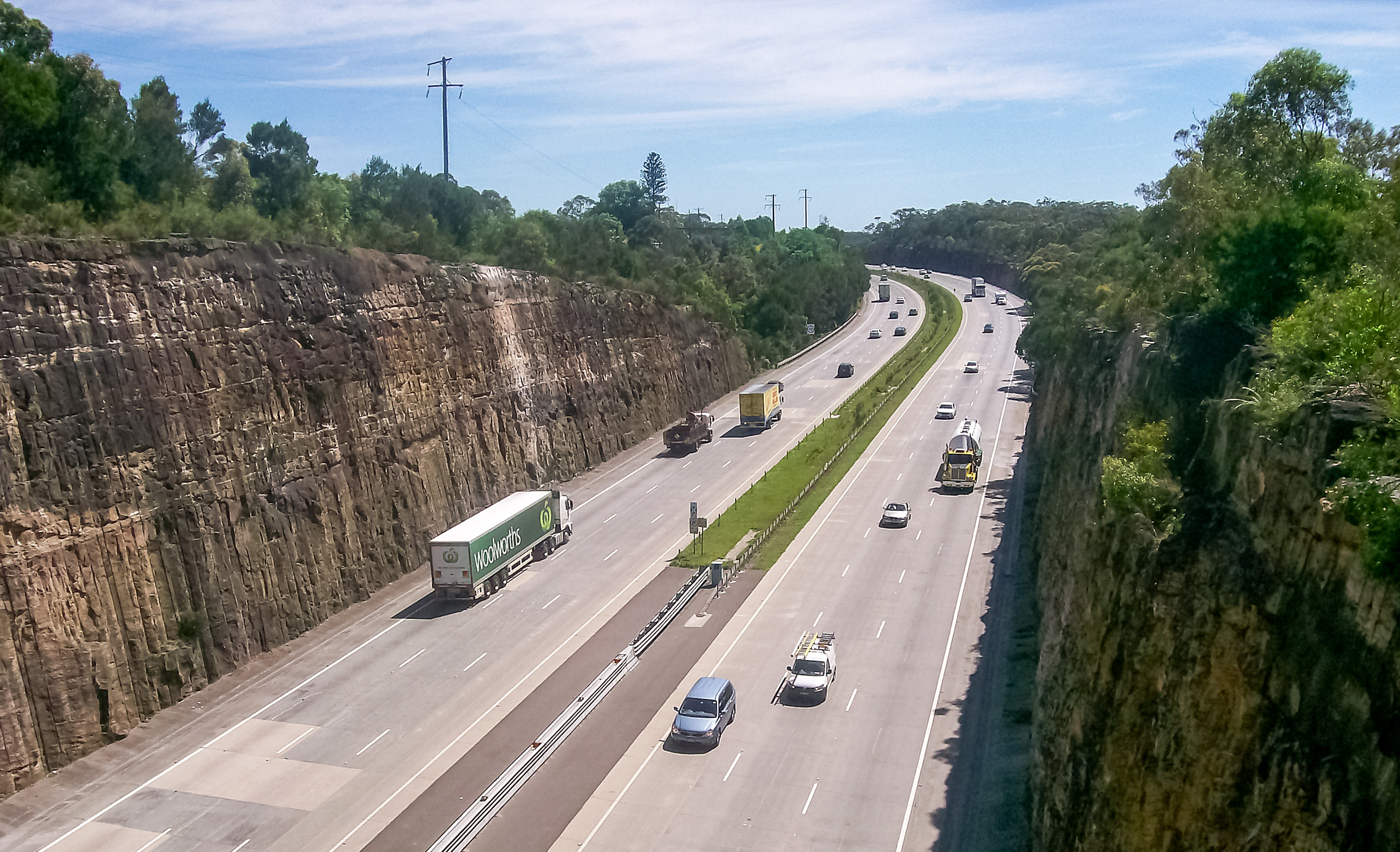
- View of Pacific Motorway northbound at Berowra
- Coordinates: 33.719959°S 151.106185°E (SW end); 32.773146°S 151.758711°E (NE end)

General information
- Type: Motorway
- Length: 140.4 km (87 mi)
- Opened: 15 December 1965
- Gazetted: August 1974
- Maintained by: DMR (1965–1989); RTA (1990–2011); RMS (2011–2019); TfNSW (2020–present)
- Route number(s): M1 (2013–present)
- Former route number: National Highway 1 (1974–2013); Freeway Route F3 (1973–1982)

Major junctions
- SW end: Pennant Hills Road; Wahroonga, Sydney
- Pacific Highway; NorthConnex; Pacific Highway; Central Coast Highway; Doyalson Link Road; Hunter Expressway; Newcastle Link Road; John Renshaw Drive; New England Highway
- NE end: Pacific Highway; Raymond Terrace, Newcastle

Location(s)
- Region: Greater Sydney, Central Coast, Hunter
- Major suburbs / towns: Berowra, Mount White, Somersby, Ourimbah, Warnervale, Morisset, West Wallsend, Tarro

Highway system
- Highways in Australia; National Highway • Freeways in Australia; Highways in New South Wales

M1 Pacific Motorway is a 140-kilometre (87 mi) motorway in New South Wales linking Sydney and Newcastle in the Hunter region via the Central Coast. Formerly known but still commonly referred to by both the public and the government as the F3 Freeway, Sydney–Newcastle Freeway, and Sydney–Newcastle Expressway, it is part of the AusLink road corridor between Sydney and Brisbane.

== Route ==
Pacific Motorway commences at its southern end at an intersection with Pennant Hills Road in Wahroonga partially shared with ramps from Northconnex, then heads in a northerly direction, immediately passing under the interchange with Pacific Highway and then another interchange with NorthConnex in Sydney's north. It continues north, skirting the western edge of Ku-ring-gai Chase National Park, running parallel with the railway line until it descends to the Hawkesbury River, crossing at Kangaroo Point in Brooklyn. Immediately north of the river, the Hawkesbury River interchange provides access to Brooklyn and Mooney Mooney before the road climbs. At Mount White there are major heavy vehicle checking stations on both northbound and southbound carriageways, to assess compliance and roadworthiness of trucks.

The motorway passes through the Brisbane Water National Park, and the Calga interchange gives access to Peats Ridge. The motorway then turns east to cross Mooney Mooney Creek by way of the 480 m (1,575 ft) long, 75 m (246 ft) high Mooney Mooney Bridge before it reaches the first major interchange on the Central Coast at Kariong. After Kariong, the motorway continues through rural and semi-rural areas of the Central Coast with interchanges at Ourimbah, Tuggerah, Warnervale and Kiar, near Doyalson. From the Doyalson interchange the motorway continues to the west of Lake Macquarie with interchanges near Morisset, Cessnock, Toronto and West Wallsend.

At the West Wallsend interchange, eastbound traffic travels along Newcastle Link Road (route A15) into Newcastle via Wallsend, and westbound traffic travels along Hunter Expressway (route M15) towards Kurri Kurri and Singleton, while the motorway continues north through interchanges at Beresfield, Tarro and Tomago to eventually terminate at an interchange outside Raymond Terrace, where it becomes Pacific Highway (A1).

Between Wahroonga and Ourimbah the motorway passes through rugged sandstone country, particularly as it descends to and ascends from the Hawkesbury River. This section of the motorway is characterised by deep cuttings and extensive embankments.

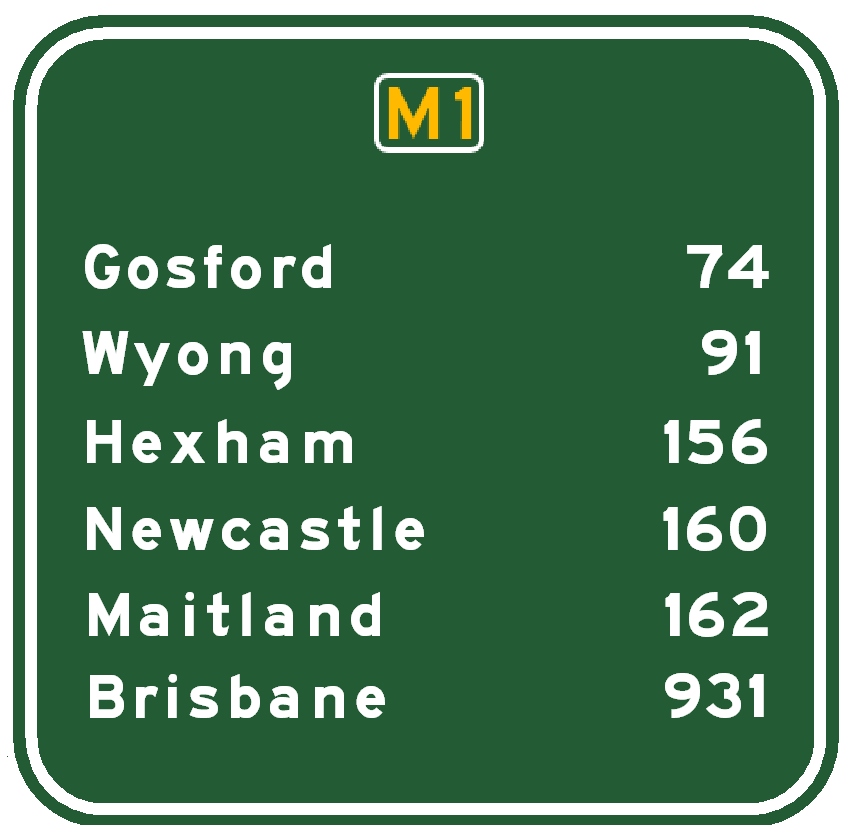
Approximate road distances (in kilometres) from Sydney of towns and cities along the Pacific Motorway (and Brisbane)

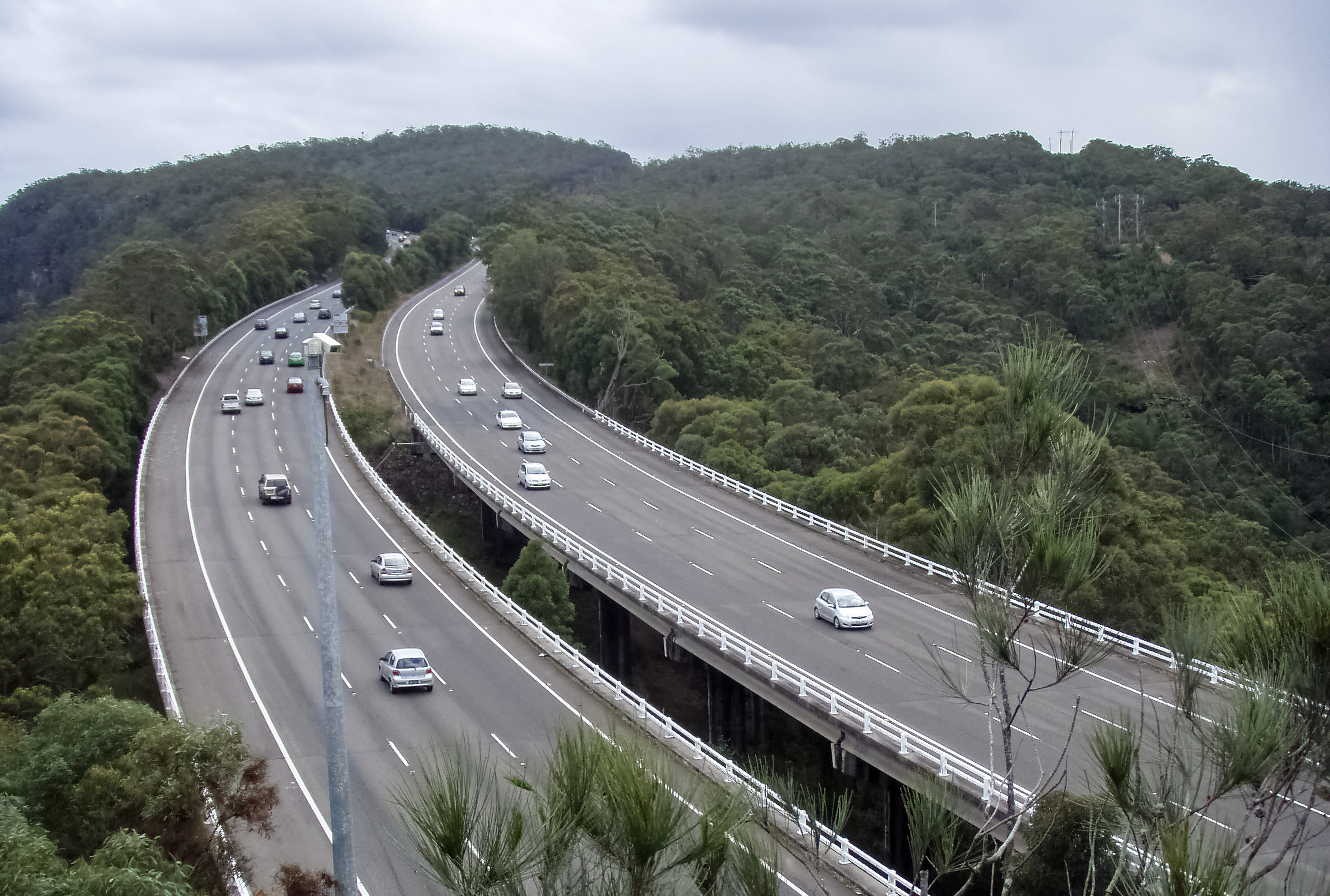
Jolls Bridge, north of the Hawkesbury River

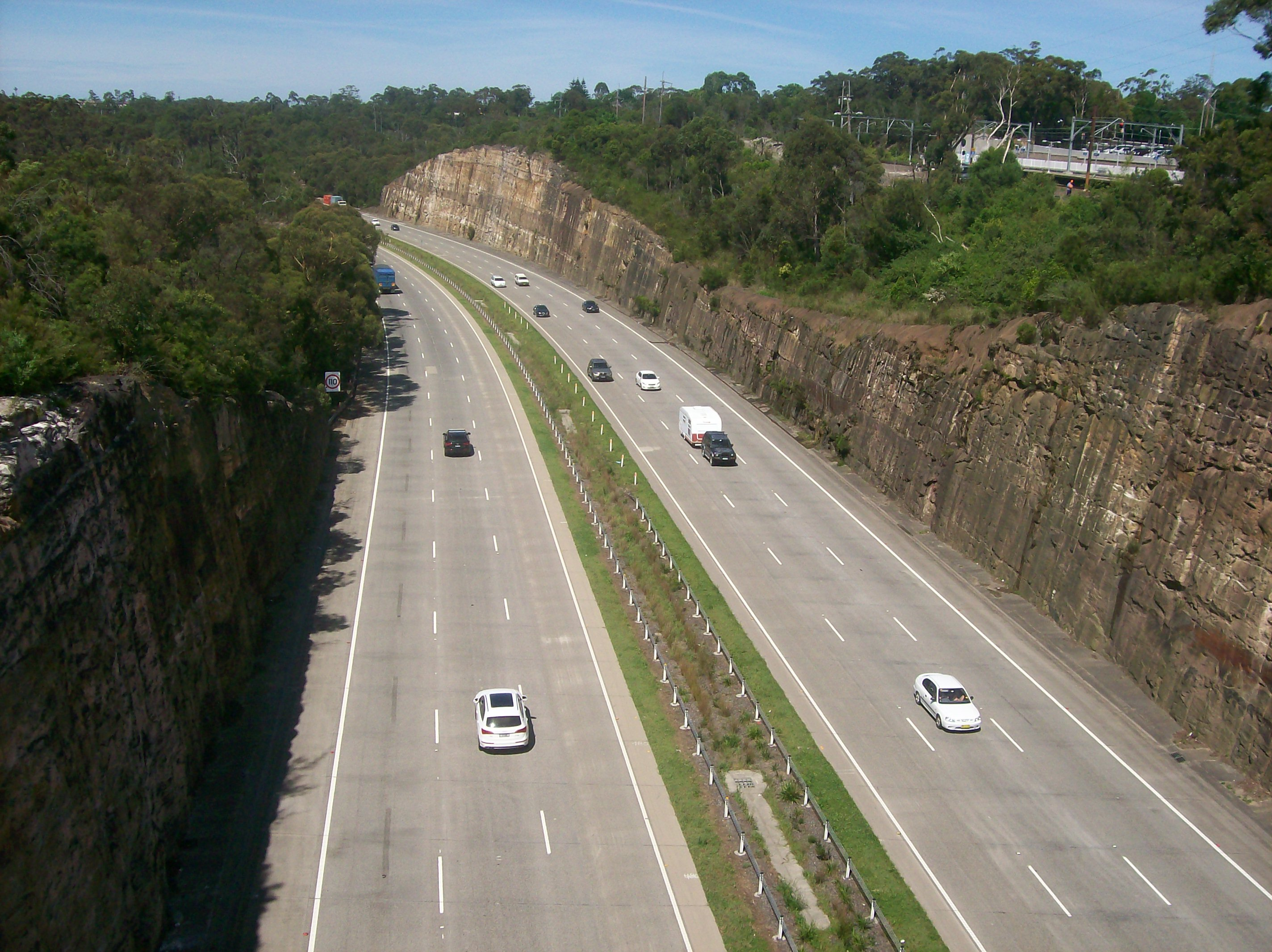
View southbound at Berowra

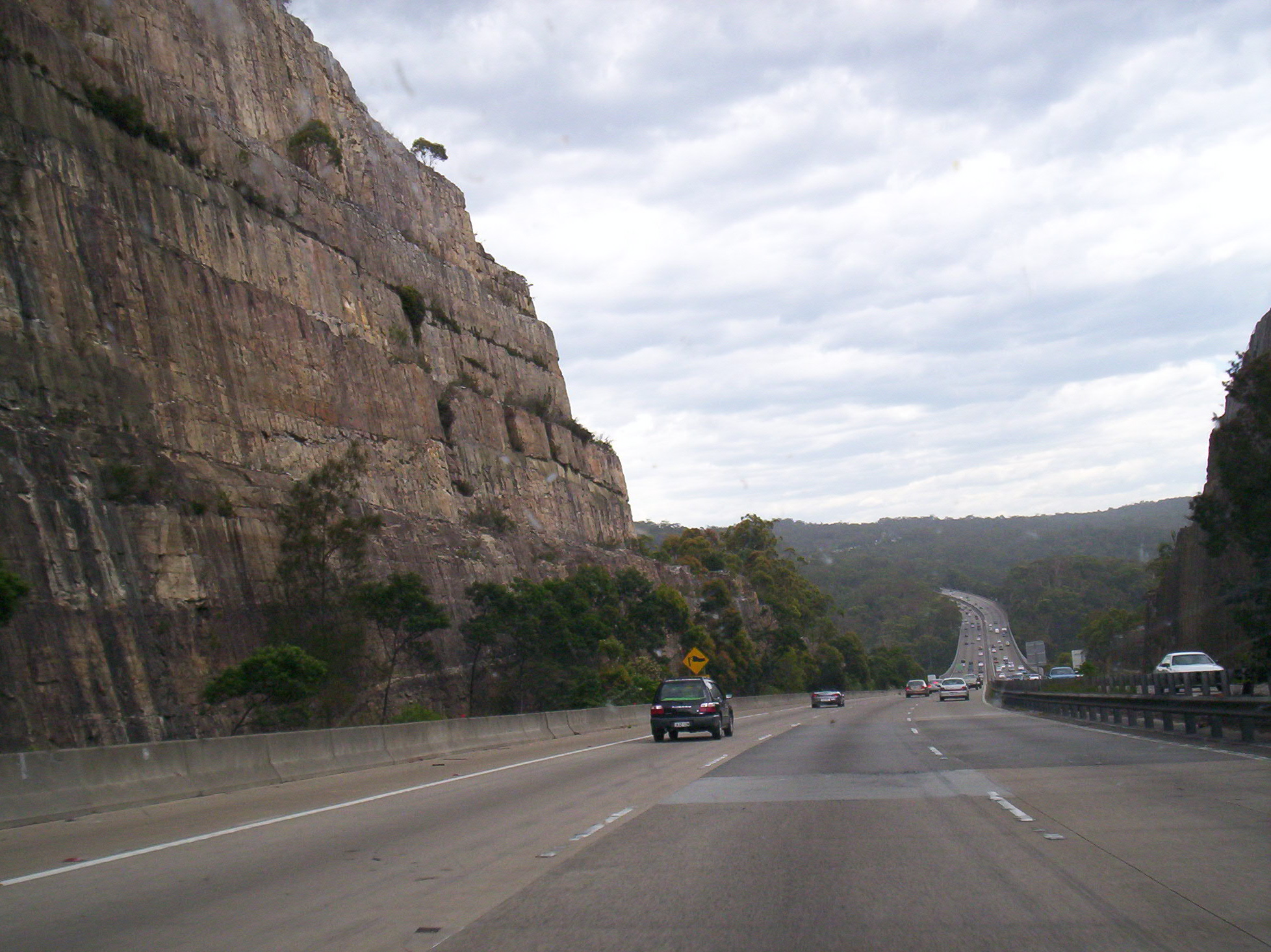
Southbound on the Sydney-Newcastle Freeway, approaching the Mooney Mooney Bridge

== History ==
=== Early planning ===
Planning for a freeway began in 1952, with the aim of providing a high-speed replacement for a section of Pacific Highway that had been built in 1925–30 which was struggling to cope with the increased traffic. It was planned that the freeway would connect to the freeway systems being proposed for both Sydney and Newcastle, providing a city-to-city freeway link.

The route between Mount White and Kariong was originally planned to be further south than the route as built, with an easier crossing of Mooney Mooney Creek. By the time that construction on this section was to begin, resistance from the NSW National Parks & Wildlife Service to the proposed route forced the Department of Main Roads to take a route through Calga, using part of the first stage of a proposed freeway route to Singleton which had been built in the 1960s. That scheme has never been further developed.

The route through the northern part of the Central Coast also changed; instead of passing east of Wyong along the western edge of the Tuggerah Lakes, development in that area forced the freeway to be moved to the west of Wyong, with link roads being constructed to meet Pacific Highway near Doyalson and Tuggerah.

In addition, the freeway was revised to go to the west of Lake Macquarie in the Lower Hunter rather than the east, and thereby bypass Newcastle. One of the reasons for this change of location was the issue of connectivity to Pacific Highway north of Newcastle, as the route of the Newcastle Inner City Bypass, which would have provided a northern extension of the freeway, is problematic in terms of its northern terminus point at Sandgate not easily allowing for a northward freeway-standard route to join to Pacific Highway.

The sections of the Newcastle Inner City Bypass from Pacific Highway at Bennetts Green to Kotara and from Jesmond to Sandgate have since been constructed, while the original freeway route between Belmont and Bennetts Green and then northward to Pacific Highway at Merewether Heights is still reserved from development, with the possibility that it could be constructed in the future.

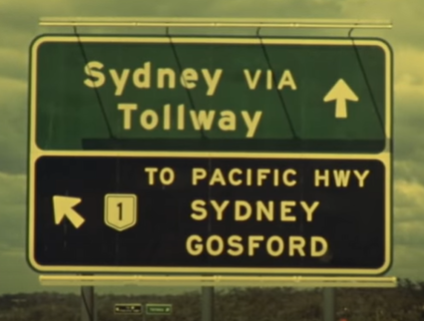
A turnoff sign when it was named a Tollway. Taken from DMR, 1968

=== Extension to Raymond Terrace ===
Originally part of the upgrade of Pacific Highway but built as a separate project, the Pacific Motorway was extended from Beresfield to Raymond Terrace, bypassing a section of the Pacific Highway. This section of John Renshaw Drive and Pacific Highway between these two points was a major bottleneck during holiday and long weekend periods, with delays lasting hours not uncommon. The layout of the twin bridges across the Hunter River at Hexham was designed primarily for local traffic to and from Newcastle, rather than to connect Pacific Highway north of Newcastle to the freeway. The Environment Impact Statement (EIS) of the extension was released in July 2021. Construction formally commenced in January 2024 and it was completed in September 2026.

=== Construction ===
The major stages in the construction of the freeway were:

- April 1963 – Construction began on the 7 km (4 mi) section from the Hawkesbury River to Mount White. This was opened as a toll road in December 1965.
- October 1966 – Opening of the Mount White-Calga section (including first section of proposed freeway to link to New England Highway at Singleton).
- December 1968 – Opening of Berowra to Hawkesbury River section as a toll road.
- October 1973 – Completion of the Brooklyn Bridge, thereby connecting the Berowra-Hawkesbury River and Hawkesbury River-Calga sections. At this time the separate tolls for the sections north and south of the Hawkesbury (20 cents for each section) were abolished and a single toll of 50 cents was introduced. This was collected at the Berowra toll booths, and the Mooney Mooney toll booths were removed. The toll was removed in 1990 when the Federal Government adopted a policy that a condition of its direct funding of the national highways was that they were to be toll-free.
- December 1983 – Concurrent opening of the Somersby to Ourimbah and Kangy Angy to Wallarah Creek sections, including the single carriageway motorway link from Wallarah Creek to Pacific Highway at Doyalson (today Doyalson Link Road).
- December 1986 – Opening of the 15 km (9 mi) section between Calga and Somersby including the Mooney Mooney Bridge.
- September 1987 – Freeway completed from Wallarah Creek interchange to Mandalong Road interchange.
- March 1988 – Freeway completed from Mandalong Road interchange to Freemans Waterhole interchange.
- March 1989 – Wahroonga to Berowra section opened
- December 1990 – Section from Freemans Waterhole Interchange to Palmer's Road completed.
- December 1993 – Palmer's Road to Minmi section opened.
- December 1997 – "Missing link" between Ourimbah and Kangy Angy opened.
- November 1998 – Extension opened between Minmi and John Renshaw Drive, Beresfield.
- September 2026 – Opening of extension between Beresfield and Raymond Terrace.

It has also undergone several subsequent upgrades:

- December 2004 – Completion of widening to six lanes of the four-lane sections between the Hawkesbury River and Calga. As part of this work, a new south bound truck weighing station was built at Mount White to replace the facility at Berowra. The station was built on the existing two-lane alignment, and a new three-lane south bound alignment was built for car traffic.
- November 2009 – Completion of widening to six lanes of the four-lane sections between Wahroonga and the Hawkesbury River, resulting in a continuous six lane width over the 43 km (27 mi) from Wahroonga to Kariong. This work was completed in three stages; stage 1 – Cowan to Berowra (3.4 km (2 mi)), completed September 2008, stage 2 – Berowra to Mount Kuring-Gai (4.9 km (3 mi)), completed September 2009) and stage 3 – Mount Kuring-Gai to Mount Colah (4.2 km (3 mi)), completed November 2009.
- August 2013 – road signs were changed to show the new M1 marker and the new name Pacific Motorway as part of a new statewide alpha numeric route scheme.
- March 2019 – Replacement of the roundabout on Pacific Motorway, John Renshaw and Weakleys Drives, with a signalised intersection.
- May 2020 – Completion of widening Pacific Motorway to three lanes in each direction from Kariong to Somersby.
- June 2020 – Completion of widening Pacific Motorway to three lanes in each direction from Tuggerah to Doyalson.

A number of interim F3 Freeway and National Highway 1 sections existed which have since been downgraded to local roads. These sections were used by freeway traffic until bypasses or new alignments were constructed.

- Peats Ridge Road, used between 1966 (opening of Mount White–Calga section) and 1986. The road opened to traffic in 1964 and linked the freeway at Calga with Pacific Highway at Ourimbah until it was bypassed by a more direct alignment. The section between Calga and Peats Ridge was an upgrade of an existing road, while the section from Peats Ridge to Ourimbah was a new grade-separated, two-lane road with long sections of third lane. The section from Somersby to Ourimbah was rebuilt to form part of the freeway and opened in 1983.
- The section of Pacific Highway between Ourimbah Creek Road and 33.328478°S 151.386916°E at Kangy Angy, used between 1955 and 1997. Freeway and Pacific Highway traffic shared this section until it was bypassed in 1997.
- Doyalson Link Road (opened as Motorway Link), used between 1983 and 1988. It was the interim northern end of the freeway and still connects directly to Pacific Highway after the freeway was extended.
- The section of Lenaghans Drive north of Stockrington Road, used 1993 and 1998. It was the interim northern end of the freeway and connected directly to the John Renshaw Drive intersection.

=== Identity ===
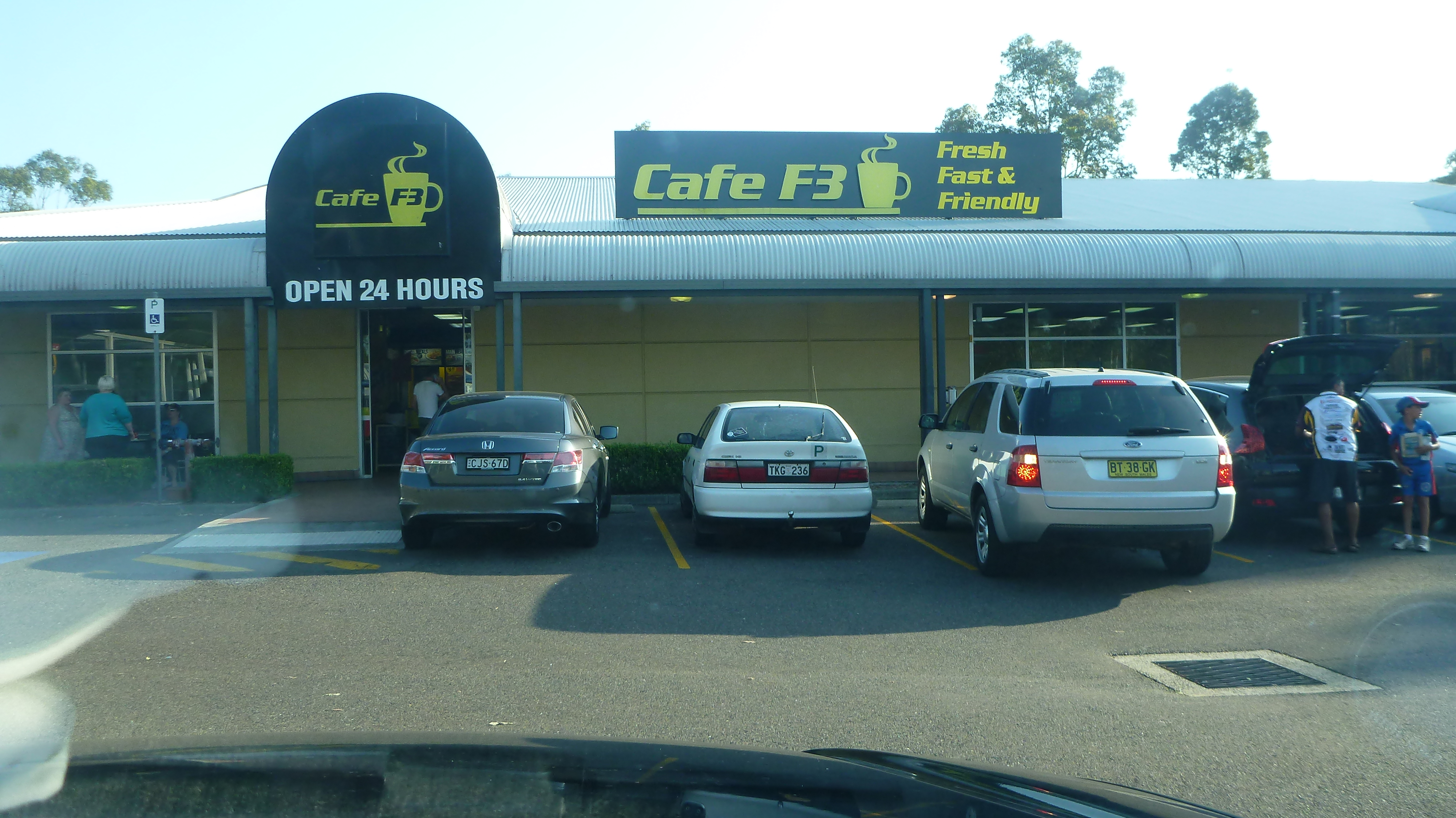
The northbound and southbound cafes at the Warnervale interchange are called "Cafe F3", reflecting the road's former route allocation and its common name.

The passing of the Main Roads Act of 1924 through the Parliament of New South Wales provided for the declaration of Main Roads, roads partially funded by the State government through the Main Roads Board (MRB, later Transport for NSW). With the subsequent passing of the Main Roads (Amendment) Act of 1929 to provide for additional declarations of State Highways and Trunk Roads, the Department of Main Roads (having succeeded the MRB in 1932) declared Sydney-Newcastle Expressway as a motorway (under plan number 6003), on 7 August 1974, and was re-declared to cover each extension until it reached its northern terminus in Beresfield; the motorway today still retains this declaration (under Motorway 6003).

The freeway at one stage carried the Freeway Route 3 (or F3) designation. This route numbering system, introduced in 1973, was to provide distinctive route numbering and signage for freeways in Sydney and the surrounding areas. However, it was quickly replaced by the National Highway 1 designation in 1974. Despite this, it was still often referred to as the F3 Freeway, with this title being used not only colloquially but on state and federal government documents and also some road signs.

The turnoff sign at Pennant Hills. Photo taken 2003

With the conversion to the newer alphanumeric system in 2013, National Highway 1 was replaced with route M1, and Sydney-Newcastle Expressway was officially renamed as M1 Pacific Motorway.

The name is used for the F3 Derby, a rivalry between professional soccer teams from Sydney and Newcastle. The men's derby uses a concrete drilling core from the freeway, while the women's derby uses a piece of guard rail.

== Proposed upgrades and connections ==
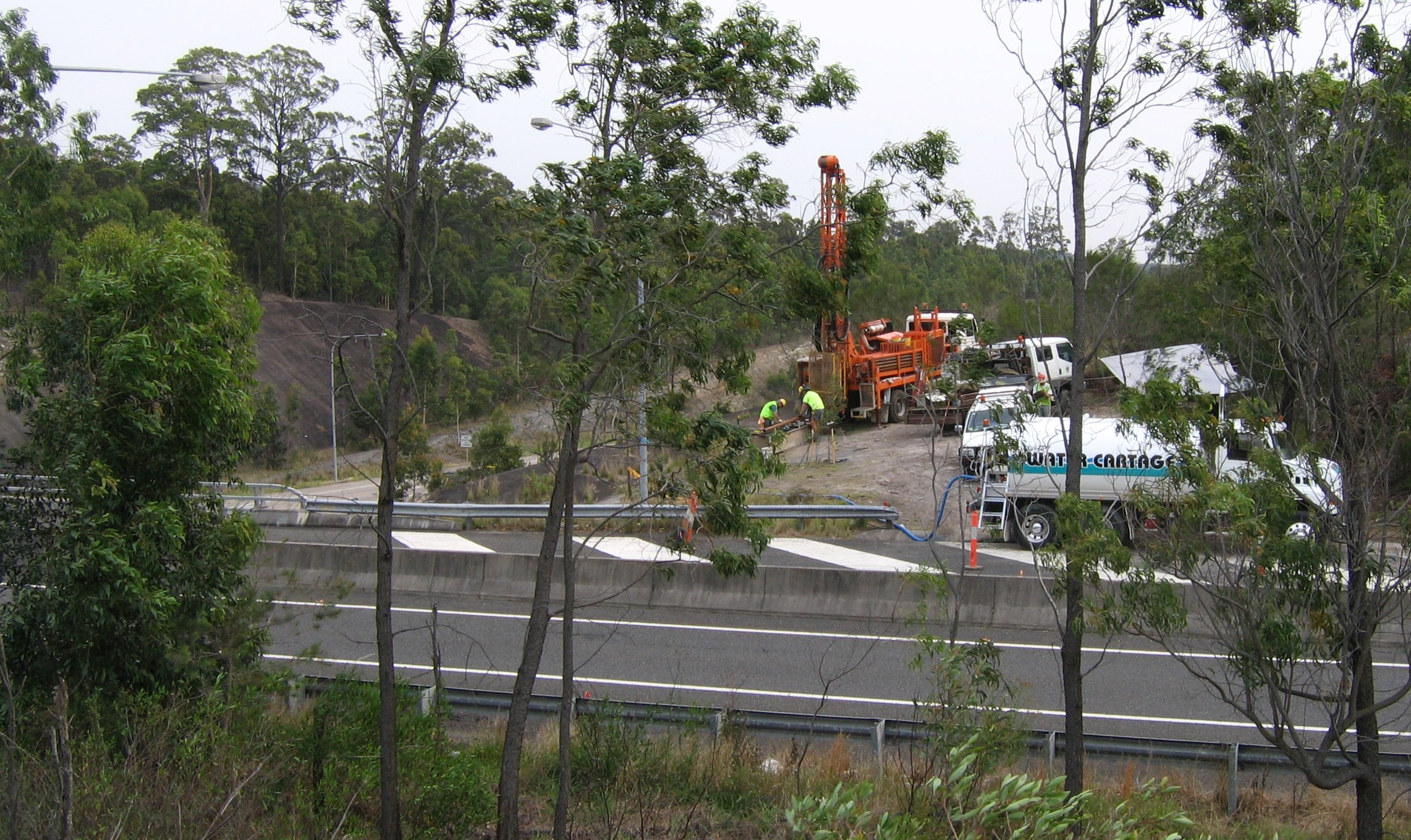
Core sampling in preparation for construction of the Hunter Expressway

Strong public resistance in the 1970s to freeways being constructed within cities and unfavourable outcomes of government inquiries resulted in several freeway proposals in Sydney being abandoned. This included the connecting Lane Cove Valley and North Western Expressways, which means that Pacific Highway (a six-lane urban arterial) continues to be the connecting route between the freeway's southern terminus at Wahroonga and the city centre. In October 2020, NorthConnex opened via an alternative route, connecting the motorway at Wahroonga with the M2 Hills Motorway near the Pennant Hills Road interchange. Through traffic can proceed to the city centre via the Lane Cove Tunnel, or to Canberra and Melbourne via Westlink M7 and Hume Highway.

== Traffic disruption ==
Other than Pacific Highway, which the motorway has superseded, the motorway is the only direct route between Sydney and the Central Coast, and is the major road route for road transport from Sydney to the Central Coast, Hunter, Mid North Coast, Northern Rivers and Queensland. The motorway thus carries a heavy mix of commuter traffic, road freight transport, and (periodically) holiday and recreational travellers. It often suffers from traffic disruptions, generally associated with traffic volume and congestion related to on-road breakdowns and vehicle accidents, or natural disasters (in particular, bushfire).

In addition traffic on the motorway is frequently affected by vehicle crashes, often involving trucks. These events have encouraged the NSW motoring organisation NRMA to call for more freight to be moved by rail to reduce the number of trucks using the motorway.

Bushfires have caused closure of the motorway and the nearby railway line and Pacific Highway between Sydney and the Hawkesbury River on a number of occasions. One such event of this type was recorded on 21 and 22 January 2007, when a fire broke out in the adjoining Ku-ring-gai Chase National Park. The fire forced the closure of the two roads and the railway line between Sydney and the Central Coast, resulting in extended disruption to traffic flow.

Because of the frequency of these disruptions to traffic flow, arguments for a second major freeway north from the Sydney metropolitan area continue to be pushed forward. However topography and resultant cost rules this out for practical purposes, other than indirect routes crossing the Hawkesbury in the vicinity of Wiseman's Ferry, some 30 km upstream of the current crossing.

Following criticism of significant delays due to accidents and blockages, the NSW Roads and Traffic Authority announced in 2010 that it was undertaking a $28 million emergency plan for the motorway which involved the development of a 40 km/h contraflow traffic scheme to allow vehicles to travel around an accident.

== Traffic volume ==
The Annual average daily traffic (AADT) data from the Roads & Traffic Authority showed a decline in traffic volume on the motorway near its southern end at Wahroonga, from 78,600 in 2002 to about 76,600 in 2005 and then to 75,800 in 2006.

The 2004 AADT figures for other locations on the motorway include 73,400 at Mooney Mooney, just north of the Hawkesbury River bridge, 60,100 near Wyong, 38,500 near Wyee, 27,000 near Freemans Waterhole and 33,000 near its northern terminus at Beresfield.

== Interchanges ==
LGA	Location	km	mi	Exit	Destinations	Notes
Greater Sydney
Hornsby	Wahroonga	0.0	0.0		Pennant Hills Road (Cumberland Highway) (A28) – Pennant Hills, Parramatta	Southern terminus of motorway and route M1
Hornsby–Ku-ring-gai boundary	Wahroonga	0.1	0.062	Wahroonga interchange	Pacific Highway (A1) – Hornsby, Pymble	Half-diamond interchange, northbound entrance and southbound exit only
Hornsby–Ku-ring-gai boundary	Wahroonga	1.8	1.1		NorthConnex (M11) – Parramatta, West Pennant Hills, Prestons	Northbound entrance and southbound exit only
Hornsby	Mount Colah	4.8	3.0	Mount Colah interchange	Ku-Ring-Gai Chase Road – Mount Colah, Bobbin Head	Half-diamond interchange, southbound entrance and northbound exit only
Hornsby	Berowra	10.5	6.5	Windybanks interchange	Pacific Highway (B83) – Berowra, Mount Kuring-gai	Half-trumpet interchange, southbound entrance and northbound exit only
Hornsby	Cowan	14.2	8.8	Berowra interchange	Pacific Highway (B83) – Berowra	Partial Y interchange, northbound entrance and southbound exit only
Central Coast
Hawkesbury River		23.1– 23.7	14.4– 14.7	Hawkesbury River ("Brooklyn") Bridge		
Central Coast	Mooney Mooney	24.1	15.0	Hawkesbury River interchange	Pacific Highway (B83) – Mooney Mooney, Brooklyn	Controlled offset dumbbell interchange
Central Coast	Mount White	32.3	20.1	Mount White interchange	Pacific Highway (B83) – Mount White	Trumpet interchange
Central Coast	Calga	37.7	23.4	Calga interchange	Pacific Highway (B83 east) – Mooney Mooney Creek, Somersby; Peats Ridge Road (north) – Calga, Peats Ridge	
Mooney Mooney Creek		40.7	25.3	Mooney Mooney Bridge		
Central Coast	Somersby	44.0	27.3	Kariong interchange	Central Coast Highway (A49 east) – Gosford, Woy Woy, Terrigal; Wisemans Ferry Road (B83 north) – Somersby, Wisemans Ferry	Partial Y/half-diamond interchange
Central Coast	Somersby	50.9	31.6	Somersby interchange	Peats Ridge Road – Somersby, Peats Ridge	Trumpet interchange
Central Coast	Ourimbah	57.4	35.7	Ourimbah interchange	Pacific Highway – Ourimbah, Palmdale	Dumbbell interchange
Central Coast	Mardi–Tuggerah boundary	62.9	39.1	Tuggerah interchange	Wyong Road (B74 east) – Wyong, Tuggerah, The Entrance; Old Maitland Road (west) – Alison	Partial dumbbell interchange with northbound loop
Wyong River		66.2	41.1	Bridge name unknown		
Central Coast	Halloran–Jilliby–Wallarah tripoint	72.0	44.7	Warnervale interchange	Sparks Road (B70 east, unallocated west) – Warnervale, Toukley	Diamond interchange with northbound loop Connected to Wallarah Creek Interchange
Central Coast	Halloran–Jilliby–Wallarah–Kiar quadripoint	74.5	46.3	Wallarah Creek interchange	Doyalson Link Road (A43) – Doyalson, Swansea	Partial Y interchange, southbound entrance and northbound exit only Connected to Warnervale Interchange
Hunter (Greater Newcastle)
Lake Macquarie	Morisset	86.5	53.7	Morisset interchange	Mandalong Road (B53) – Morisset, Doyalson, Cooranbong	Diamond interchange
Dora Creek		90.1	56.0	Bridge name unknown		
Lake Macquarie	Cooranbong	99.6	61.9	Freemans Waterhole interchange	Freemans Drive (B82 north, unallocated south) – Kurri Kurri, Cessnock	Half-diamond interchange, southbound entrance and northbound exit only
Lake Macquarie	Freemans Waterhole	103.5	64.3	Awaba interchange	Palmers Road – Toronto	Diamond interchange
Lake Macquarie	West Wallsend	116.6	72.5	West Wallsend interchange	George Booth Drive (B89 south, unallocated north) – Cardiff	Half-diamond interchange, southbound entrance and northbound exit only
Lake Macquarie	Cameron Park	118.0	73.3	Newcastle interchange	Hunter Expressway (M15 west) – Branxton, Singleton, Tamworth; Newcastle Link Road (A15 east) – Wallsend, Newcastle	Stack interchange with northbound loop Not to be confused with Newcastle Interchange
Newcastle	Black Hill	124.6	77.4	Black Hill entrance	Black Hill Road – Black Hill	Northbound entry only
Newcastle	Beresfield–Black Hill boundary	126.7	78.7	Beresfield interchange	John Renshaw Drive (B68 west, east) – Kurri Kurri, Cessnock; Weakleys Drive (north) – Beresfield, Maitland; Lenaghans Drive (south) – Lenaghan (entry southbound only)	Half-diamond interchange, southbound entrance and northbound exit only
Newcastle	Tarro	129.6	80.5	Tarro interchange	New England Highway (A43 north) – Beresfield, Maitland; John Renshaw Drive (B68 west) – Kurri Kurri, Cessnock	Half-diamond interchange, eastbound entrance and westbound exit only
Hunter River		132.3	82.2	Hunter River Viaduct		
Port Stephens	Tomago	133.7	83.1	Tomago interchange	Pacific Highway – Raymond Terrace, Tomago, Newcastle	Full interchange
Port Stephens	Heatherbrae	140.4	87.2	Heatherbrae interchange	Pacific Highway (A1 north) – Taree, Port Macquarie, Coffs Harbour, Brisbane	Half-diamond interchange, northbound entrance and southbound exit only Northern terminus of route M1, route A1 continues north along Pacific Highway
1.000 mi = 1.609 km; 1.000 km = 0.621 mi: Incomplete access; Route transition

== See also ==
- The F3 Derby
- Freeways in Australia
- Freeways in New South Wales
