= Kiar =

Kiar may refer to:

- Kiar County, an Iranian county in Chaharmahal and Bakhtiari Province
- Kiar, New South Wales, a suburb in the Central Coast region of New South Wales
- Marty Kiar, a Democratic politician in Florida

== See also ==
- Kiara (disambiguation)
- Kjárr, a figure in North mythology
