= Pacific Motorway =

Pacific Motorway may refer to:

- Pacific Motorway (Brisbane–Brunswick Heads), Pacific Motorway from Brisbane, Queensland, to Brunswick Heads in northern NSW
- Pacific Motorway (Sydney–Newcastle), Pacific Motorway from Sydney to Newcastle

== See also ==
- Pacific Highway (Australia)
