= Louth Park =

Louth Park may refer to:

- Louth Park Abbey, a former Cistercian abbey in Lincolnshire, England.
- Louth Park, New South Wales, a suburb of the City of Maitland in the Hunter Region
