= Wallarah =

- Suburb
- Interactive map of Wallarah
- Coordinates: 33°13′23″S 151°27′54″E
- Country: Australia
- State: New South Wales
- City: Central Coast
- LGA: Central Coast Council
- Location: 11 km (6.8 mi) NNE of Wyong

Government
  - State electorate: Wyong
  - Federal division: Dobell

Area
  - Total: 8.1 km^{2} (3.1 sq mi)
- Postcode: 2259
- Parish: Munmorah
Suburbs around Wallarah
Jilliby	Bushells Ridge	Doyalson North
Halloran	Wallarah	Charmhaven
Halloran	Warnervale	Woongarrah

Wallarah is a sparsely populated suburb of the Central Coast region of New South Wales, Australia. It is part of the Central Coast Council local government area.

It is home to the Wallarah Creek interchange on the M1 Pacific Motorway.
