= Hunter Expressway =

Freeway in New South Wales, Australia

Hunter Expressway New South Wales
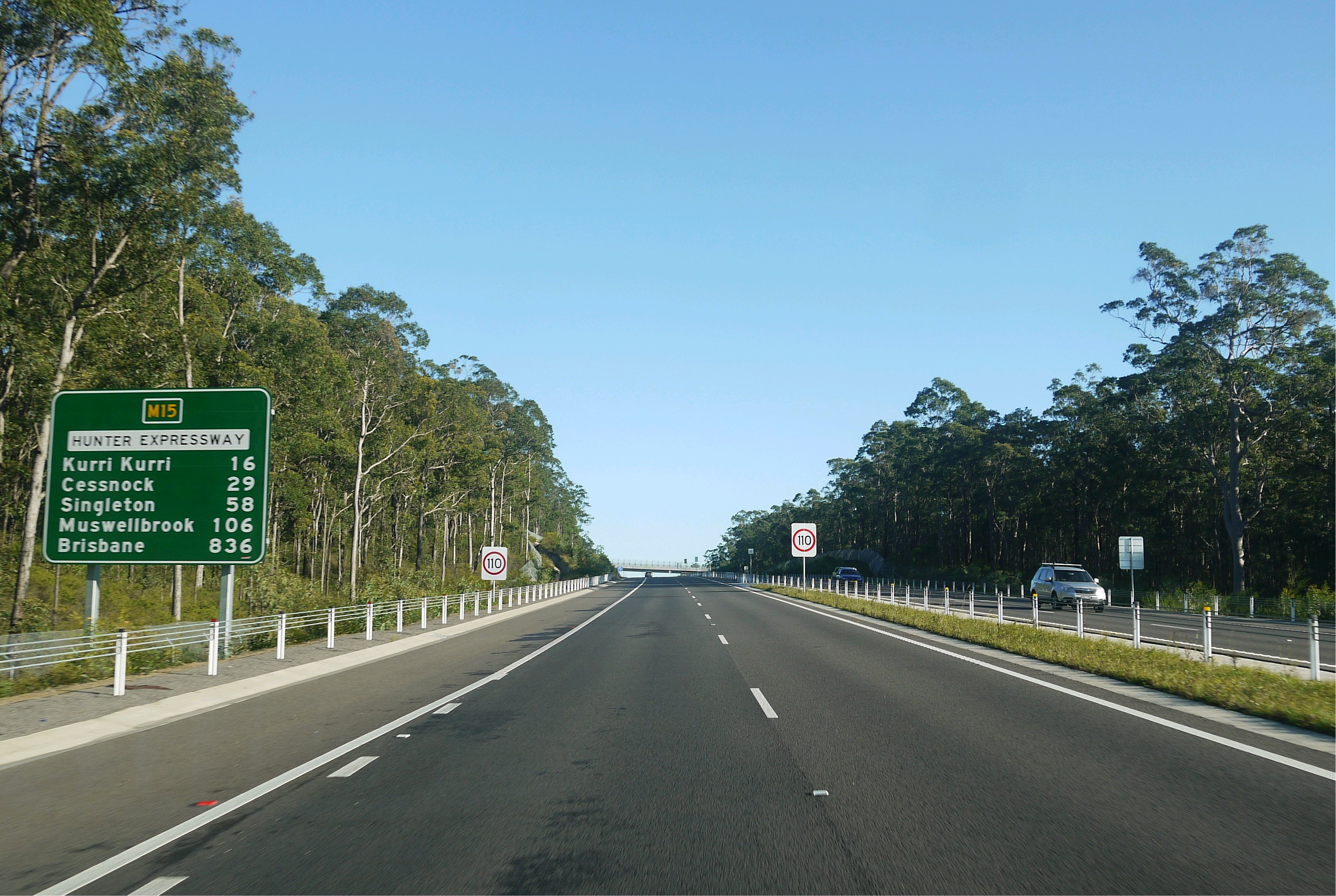
- View westbound after the Newcastle Interchange
- Approximate location of the Hunter Expressway in NSW
- Coordinates: 32°53′27.2″S 151°35′58.8″E (ESE end); 32°39′19.13″S 151°19′15.55″E (WNW end)

General information
- Type: Freeway
- Length: 39.5 km (25 mi)
- Built by: Hunter Expressway Alliance (Eastern section); Abigroup (Western section)
- Route number(s): M15 (2014–present)

Major junctions
- ESE end: Newcastle Link Road; Cameron Park, New South Wales
- Pacific Motorway; John Renshaw Drive; Wine Country Drive
- WNW end: New England Highway; Belford, New South Wales

Location(s)
- Region: Hunter
- LGA(s): City of Lake Macquarie; City of Cessnock; City of Maitland; Singleton Council
- Major suburbs / towns: Seahampton, Stockrington, Richmond Vale, Buchanan, Heddon Greta, Loxford, Sawyers Gully, Keinbah, Allandale, Greta

Highway system
- Highways in Australia; National Highway • Freeways in Australia; Highways in New South Wales

The Hunter Expressway is a 39.5-kilometre (24.5 mi) long controlled-access highway in New South Wales, Australia. It was previously known as the F3 to Branxton link or Kurri Kurri Corridor during the planning stage. It has two lanes in each direction, running generally north west from the Pacific Motorway at the Newcastle Link Road interchange to the eastern end of the Belford Bends Deviation on the New England Highway north of Branxton. The road allows traffic to bypass the Maitland area, Lochinvar, Greta and Branxton. The expressway opened on 22 March 2014.

== History ==
What is now the Hunter Expressway was originally proposed in 1988 under the name Kurri Kurri Corridor. While the road design approved in 2001 was for a speed limit of 100 km/h (60 mph), the Roads & Traffic Authority applied in March 2007 to make several changes, including revising the design for a speed limit of 110 km/h (70 mph). The New South Wales Department of Planning approved those changes on 19 August 2007.

=== Pre-construction work ===
The Roads & Traffic Authority obtained approval in July 2006 to allow the construction of the road to be staged. This did not mean that the road would be opened in stages but that preparatory work including relocation of high voltage power lines, gas mains, telecommunication cabling, water and sewer mains and the South Maitland Railway line could be carried out prior to commencing construction of the road. This was done because the relocation of services during road construction may have caused unpredictable delays.

The construction of a new bridge to carry the South Maitland railway line over the new road was put out to tender in 2007. However, despite the tender closing date being put back four times, the tender was not awarded.

At the time, it was anticipated that the $253 million pre-construction work would be completed in mid 2008 and construction of the road would commence immediately after the pre-construction was completed.

=== Funding uncertainty ===
Prior to the 2007 Australian federal election, the then coalition government pledged to fund the construction of the road as part of the AusLink II funding plan and the then opposition pledged to match the government funding commitment. On the Sunday immediately after the election, the federal member for Hunter and member of the incoming Labor government, Joel Fitzgibbon, announced in an interview that he "was no longer convinced that it was the best option for the area and wanted a new independent assessment of the project." A $1 million study, titled the "Lower Hunter Transport Needs Study" was "commissioned in part to cost the bypass".

As part of the 2008 federal budget, money that the previous government had intended to spend on infrastructure during the 2008–09 budget year was instead placed into a fund while a newly created authority, Infrastructure Australia carried out studies to determine which projects should be funded and which should not.

Despite making no budget allocation for the road in 2007, the Government of New South Wales described the road as "critical to regional development in the Lower Hunter". In their October 2008 submission to Infrastructure Australia, the NRMA also listed the road as one of four "Regional Road Infrastructure Priorities".

The road was recommended as a "top priority" on an interim list of 94 high priority projects presented to the minister, Anthony Albanese by Infrastructure Australia on 19 December 2008. A final report was due to be presented in March 2009.

=== Regional development ===
Several developments in the region, including the proposed new township of Huntlee and new subdivisions in Branxton, Cessnock and Maitland have been described as being "held back" pending the construction of this road, since the existing road network would be unable to accommodate the increased traffic that would be generated.

A study completed in October 2008 identified an area of land at Buchanan, adjacent to an interchange of the proposed link as the preferred location for a regional freight hub. The report indicated that uncertainty over the construction of the road "may delay a final decision regarding the preferred location for Freight Hub".

=== Construction ===
Following the announcement of funding in the 2009 federal budget, a decision was made to separate the road into two separate projects. The 12.9-kilometre (8 mi) eastern section, from the M1 to Kurri Kurri, was put out to tender under an alliance agreement in July 2009. The private sector consortium selected to partner with the RTA to build that section included Thiess, Parsons Brinckerhoff and Hyder Consulting. Detailed planning began in early 2010, and construction began around June 2010.

The contract for the eastern section of the Hunter Expressway was finalised at $825 million, thus allowing major construction to begin. Thiess general manager NSW/ACT Brendan Donohue said the project would be technically complex as the corridor included a number of possible mine subsidence areas. The eastern section of the Hunter Expressway will include 2,000,000 cubic metres (2,615,901 cu yd) of earthworks, three 40-metre (131 ft) high viaduct bridges covering a total of 840 metres (2,756 ft) over possible mine subsidence areas and 16 other bridges. On 11 August 2010, Premier Kristina Keneally, and other MPs including Anthony Albanese, Kerry Hickey and Joel Fitzgibbon met at Buchanan for the turning of the first sod.

The remaining 26.6-kilometre (17 mi) section from Kurri Kurri to Branxton was tendered in 2010 as a design and construct contract. Abigroup were awarded that contract in October 2010

Construction of the Hunter Expressway

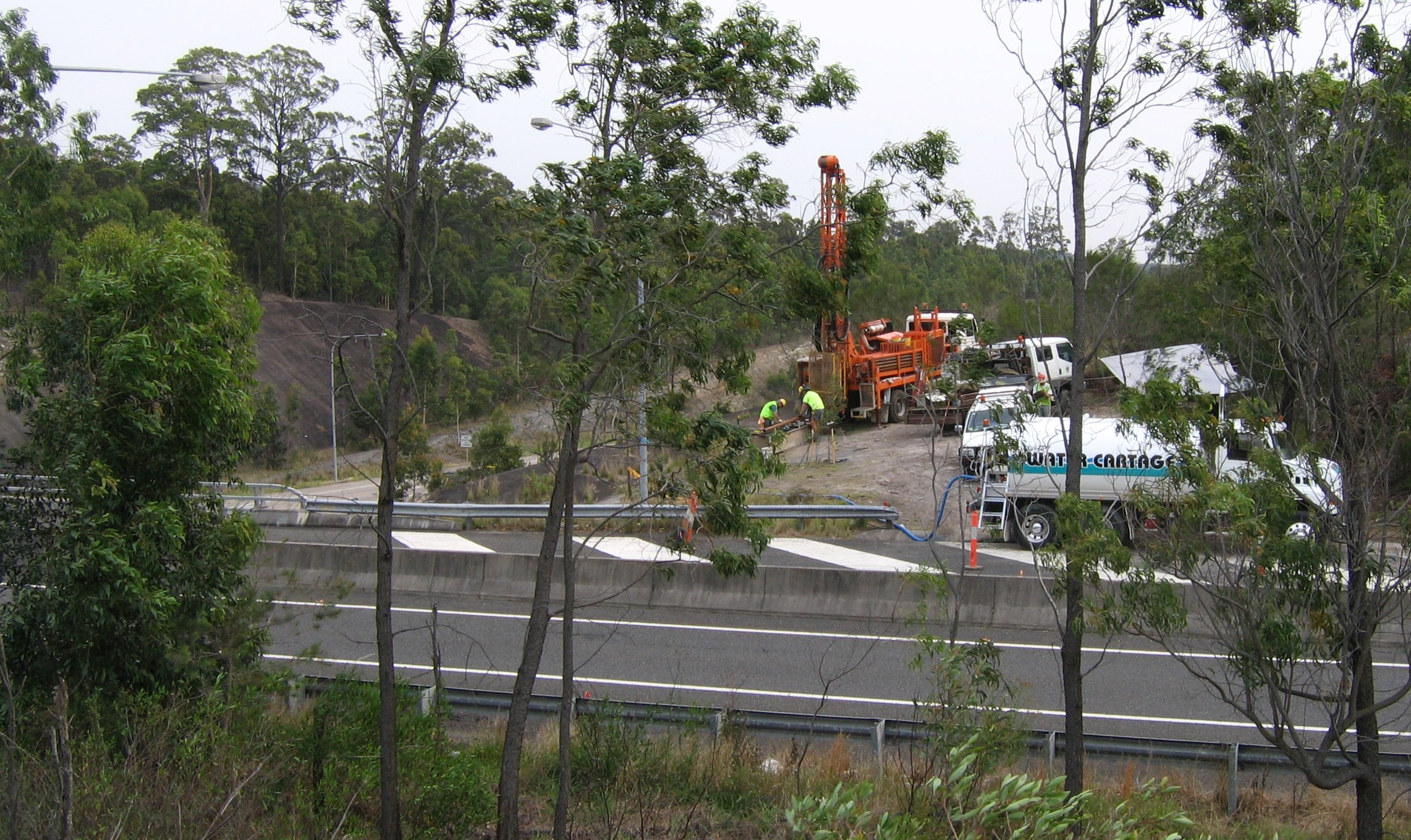
Core sampling near M1 prior to construction

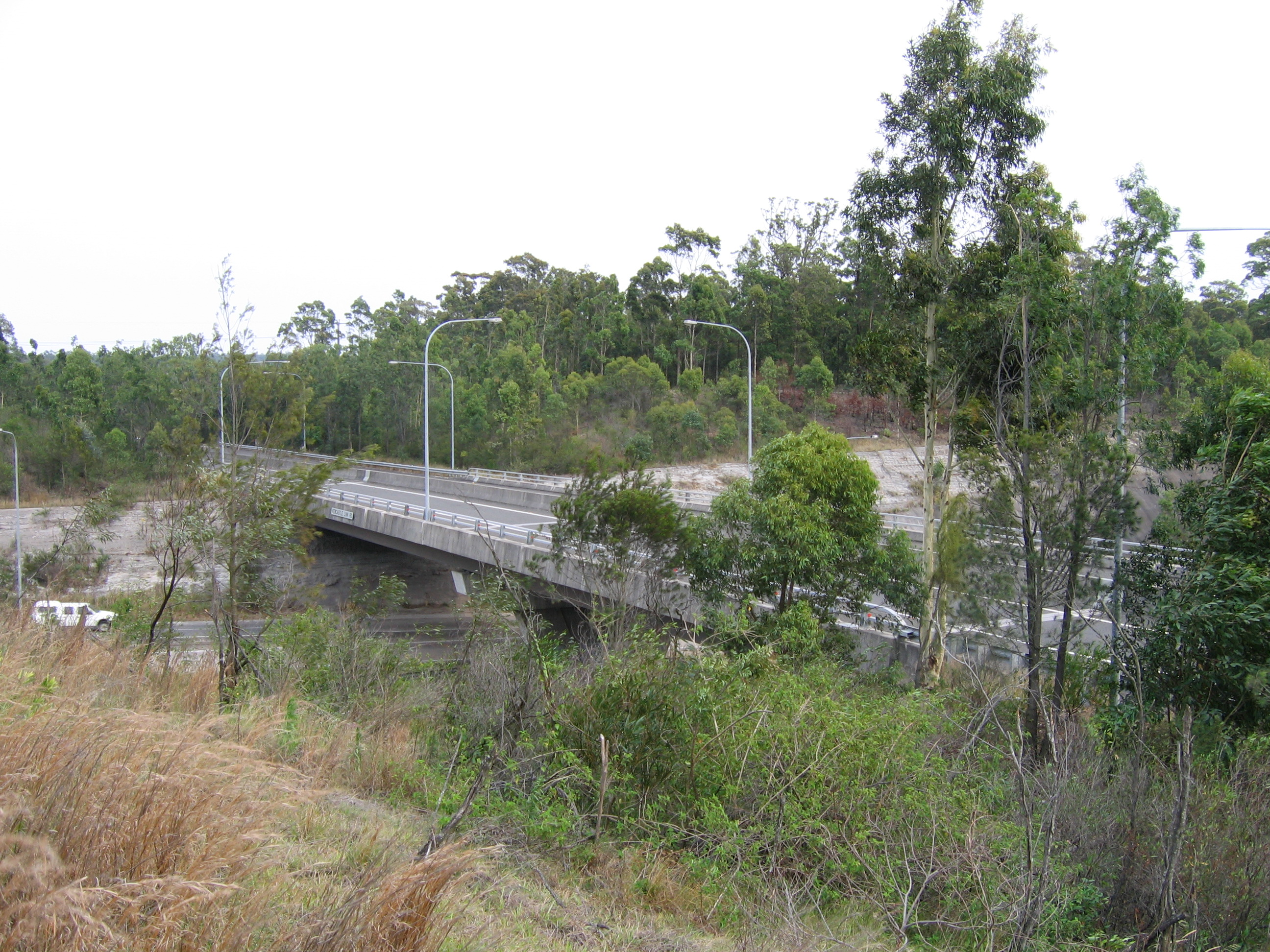
Original Newcastle Link Road bridge over M1

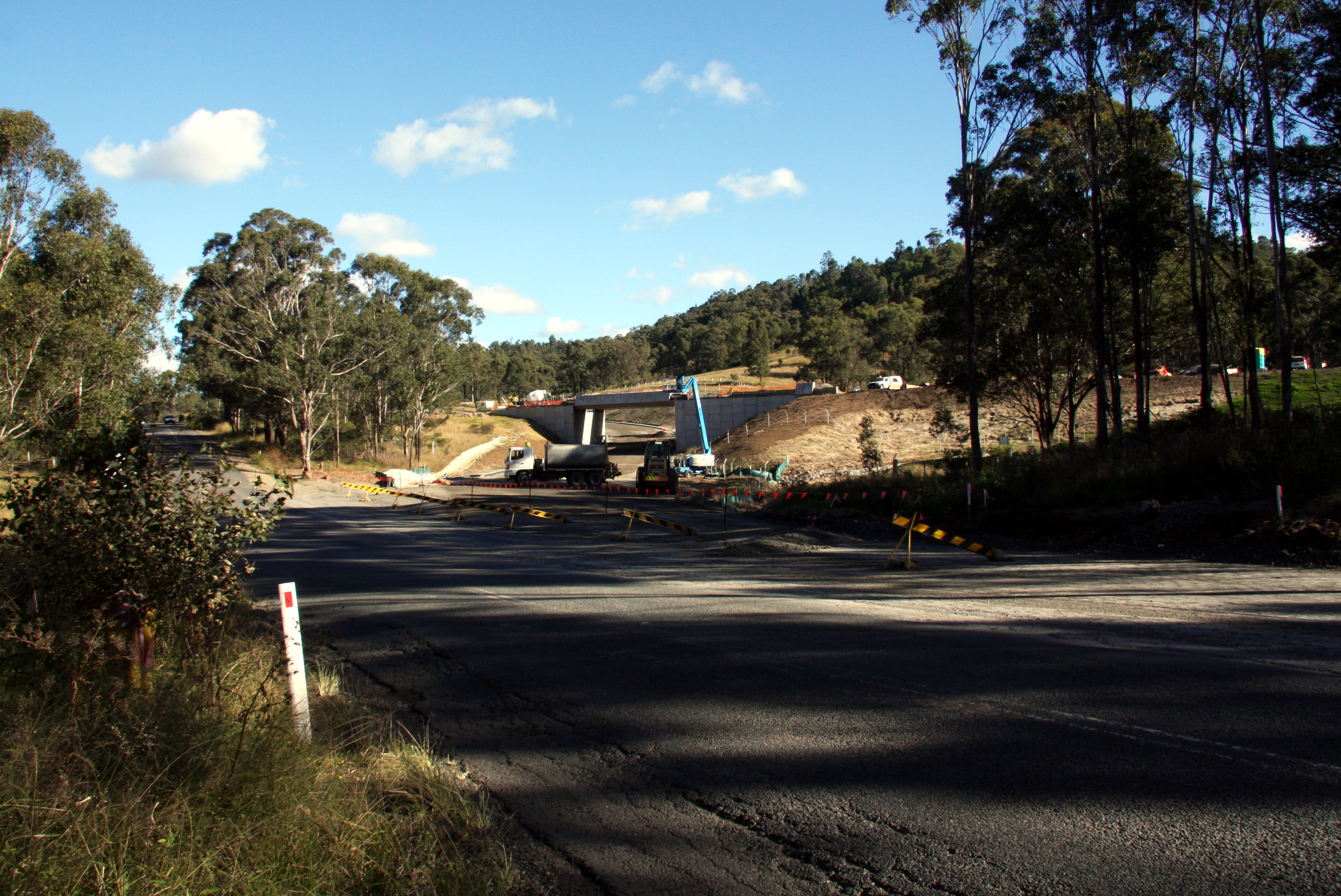
Camp Road Greta underpass and deviation under construction

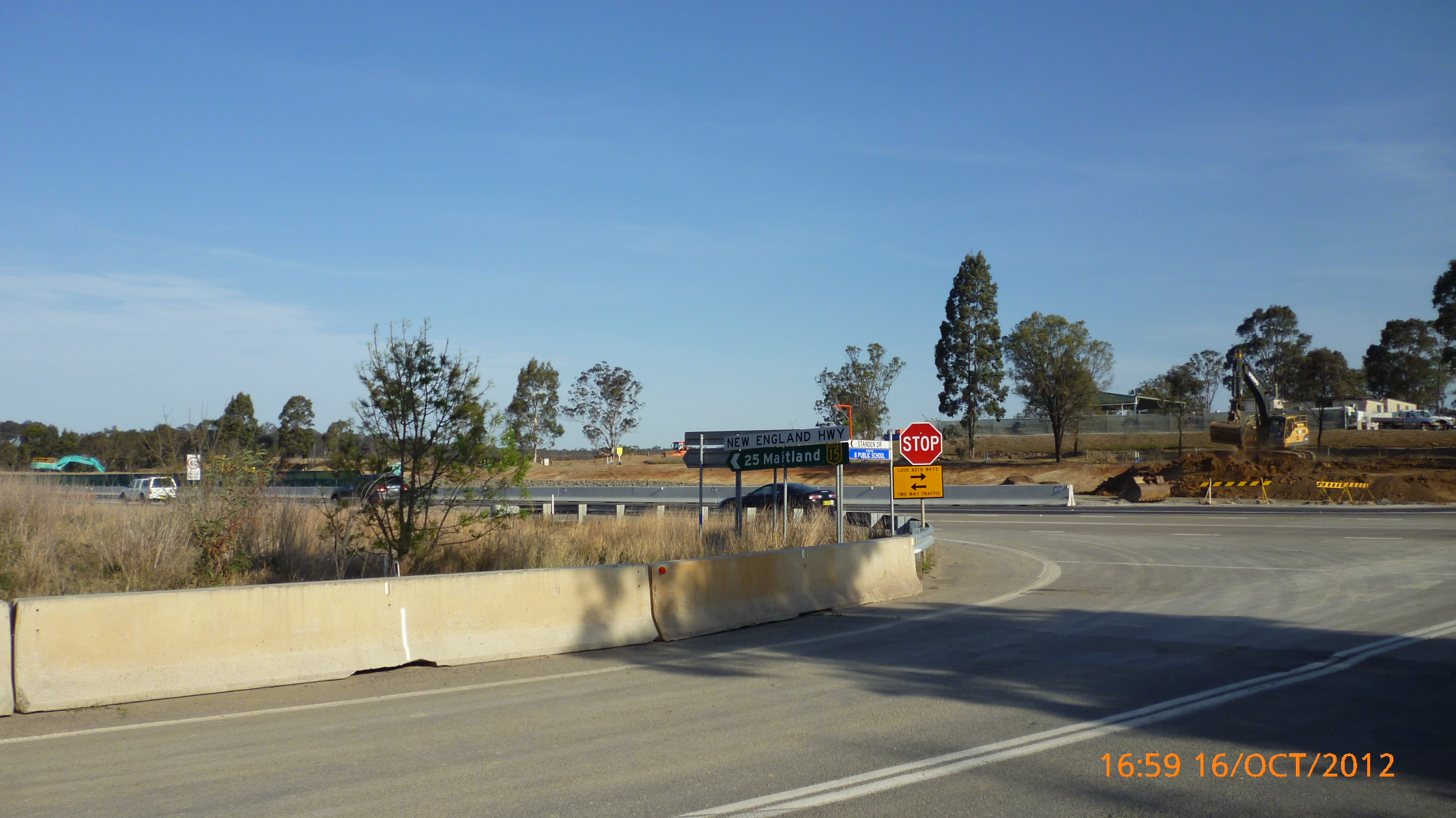
Construction at the Belford end of the road

=== Opening ===
The original contracted opening date was 20 September 2013, but construction delays caused the date to be deferred several times. The expressway was officially opened by Deputy Prime Minister Warren Truss and State Roads Minister Duncan Gay in the morning of 21 March 2014, and was opened to traffic in the evening of 22 March 2014.

== Interchanges ==
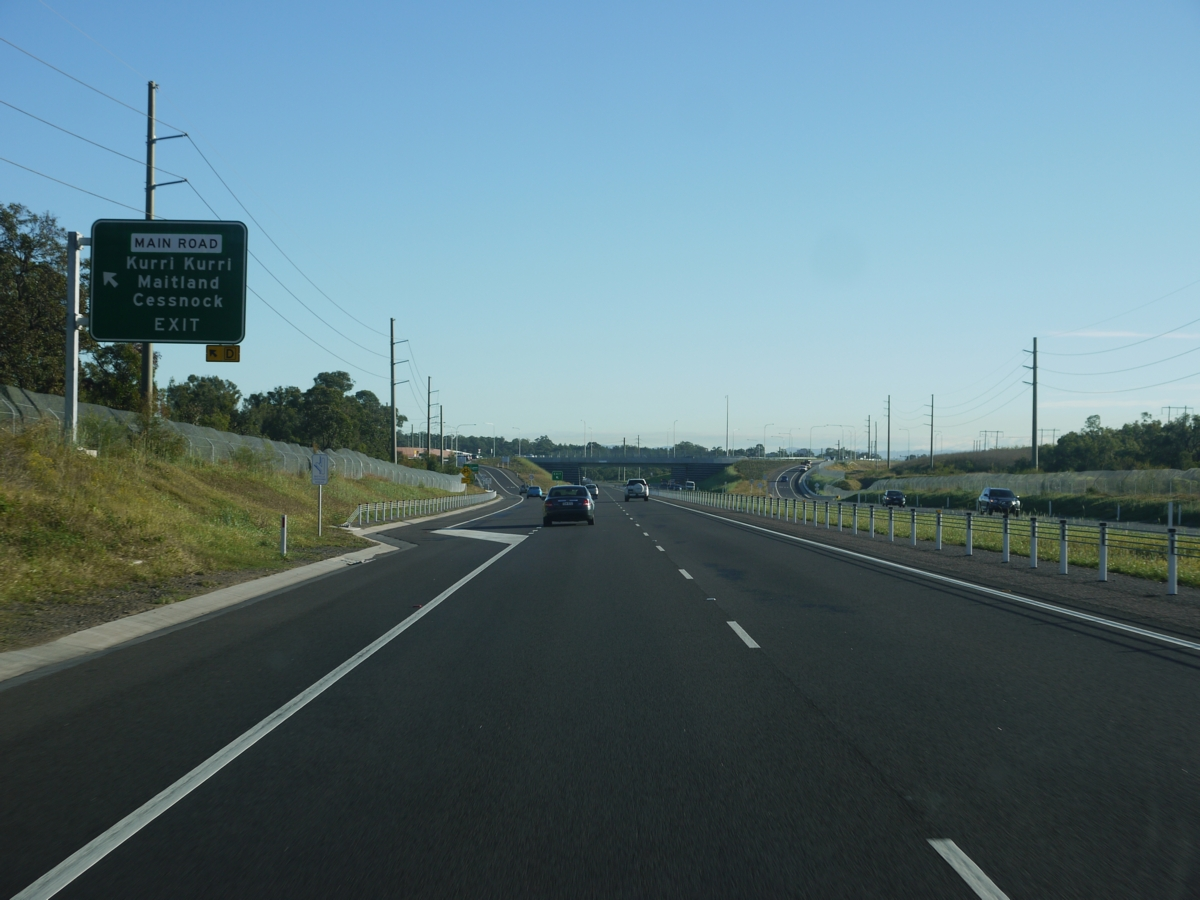
Approaching the Kurri Kurri interchange from the east

=== Newcastle interchange ===
The most easterly interchange of the Hunter Expressway. It connects the expressway with the Pacific Motorway and the Newcastle Link Road. The interchange has been significantly upgraded, with three additional bridges across the M1 in addition to the existing one and the provision of high speed on and off ramps from the new road towards Sydney while maintaining full grade separation. However motorists are unable to exit northbound to the Pacific Motorway from the Hunter Expressway or access the Hunter Expressway when heading southbound on the Pacific Motorway. The Buchanan Interchange and John Renshaw Drive have been designated to provide access between the expressway and the Pacific Highway to the north.

=== Buchanan interchange ===
A full interchange has been provided on John Renshaw Drive near the ends of George Booth Drive and Buchanan Road. As part of the construction of that interchange, the southern end of Buchanan Road was relocated to connect to a new roundabout constructed on the site of a smaller roundabout that had previously been built at the end of George Booth Drive.

=== Branxton interchange ===
A full interchange has been constructed between Greta and Branxton, with a link to the existing highway via a new bridge across the Main North railway line and a link to a new roundabout on Wine Country Drive south of Branxton.

=== New England Highway connection ===
The north western end of the link road crosses over the Main Northern railway line and joins onto the existing highway. When the new road opened, it became the main through road and existing highway on the northern side of Branxton was diverted to provide local access to Standen Drive.

=== Road junction list ===
LGA	Location	km	mi	Name	Destinations	Notes
Lake Macquarie	Cameron Park	0.0	0.0	Newcastle Interchange	Pacific Motorway (M1) – Sydney, Brisbane	No access to/from north side of Pacific Motorway (use Buchanan interchange); Continues east as Newcastle Link Road (A15) to Newcastle
Maitland / Cessnock	Buchanan	9	5.6		Wattaka Rest Area	
Maitland / Cessnock	Buchanan	10	6.2	Buchanan interchange	John Renshaw Drive (B68) – Beresfield, Kurri Kurri, East Maitland, Metford	
Maitland / Cessnock	Heddon Greta	13.6	8.5	Kurri Kurri Interchange	Main Road – Kurri Kurri, Maitland, Cessnock	
Maitland / Cessnock	Loxford			South Maitland Railway		
Maitland / Cessnock	Loxford	16.5	10.3	Loxford Interchange	Hart Road – Weston	
Maitland / Cessnock	Allandale	27.5	17.1	Allandale Interchange	Lovedale Road – Lovedale, Lochinvar	
Maitland / Cessnock	Greta	35.2	21.9	Branxton interchange	Wine Country Drive (B82) – Branxton, Cessnock, to New England Highway	
Maitland / Cessnock	Branxton	38	24		New England Highway	Heavy vehicle rest area
Singleton	Belford	39.5	24.5		Standen Drive	Continues west as New England Highway (A15)
1.000 mi = 1.609 km; 1.000 km = 0.621 mi: Incomplete access; Route transition

== See also ==
- New England Highway
- List of freeways in Australia
- List of highways in New South Wales
