= Cliftleigh, New South Wales =

Cliftleigh
- Suburb
- Coordinates: 32°47′S 151°31′E
- Country: Australia
- State: New South Wales
- Region: Hunter
- City: Cessnock
- LGA: Cessnock City Council, Maitland City Council
- Location: 27.8 km (17.3 mi) NW of Newcastle; 17 km (11 mi) ENE of Cessnock; 9.9 km (6.2 mi) SSW of Maitland
- Established: 1970

Government
  - State electorate: Cessnock
  - Federal division: Paterson

Area
  - Total: 7.6 km^{2} (2.9 sq mi)

Population
  - Total: 2,309 (SAL 2021)
- Postcode: 2321
- County: Northumberland
- Parish: Heddon
Suburbs around Cliftleigh
Loxford	Gillieston Heights	Louth Park
Loxford	Cliftleigh	Buchanan
Loxford	Heddon Greta	Buchanan

Cliftleigh is a small suburb, and planned development in the City of Cessnock, New South Wales, Australia. It is 27.8 kilometres (17 mi) north-west from Newcastle, and 17 kilometres (11 mi) east-northeast from Cessnock.

As at the 2016 census, Cliftleigh had a population of almost 900, with a potential of an additional 3,000 residents or more

== Geography ==
The hottest day recorded was 46oc on 04/01/2020

The coldest day recorded was -0.6oc on 02/09/1971

== Transport ==
Transportation services are provided by Rover Coaches. Access is provided by a main road that passes directly through Cliftleigh. During heavy rain, floods at Tester's Hollow block the road to Gillieston Heights. The South Maitland Railway is nearby, but does not provide passenger rail services.

== Environs ==
Cliftleigh's surroundings are diverse, and include wetlands, trees and views of the Mount Sugarloaf and Brokenback ranges.

== Amenities ==
Cliftleigh is less than 2 km away from the popular Kurri Kurri golf course. A drive-in operates at Heddon Greta.
