= Electoral district of Wyong =

Wyong New South Wales—Legislative Assembly
- Interactive map of district boundaries from the 2023 state election
- State: New South Wales
- Dates current: 1962–1973; 1988–present
- MP: David Harris
- Party: Labor Party
- Namesake: Wyong
- Electors: 56,809 (2023)
- Area: 640.55 km^{2} (247.3 sq mi)
- Demographic: Provincial
Electorates around Wyong:
Cessnock	Lake Macquarie	Swansea
Gosford	Wyong	Pacific Ocean
Gosford	The Entrance	The Entrance

Wyong is an electoral district of the Legislative Assembly in the Australian state of New South Wales. The district is a 640.55 km^{2} urban and semi-rural electorate on the Central Coast. It covers part of Central Coast Council, including the towns of Wyong and Toukley.

== History ==
Wyong was originally established in 1962. In 1973, it was replaced by Munmorah and a redistricted Gosford. In 1988, a recreated Wyong and The Entrance replaced Tuggerah.

In 2011 local businessman Darren Webber won the seat, becoming the first Liberal MP for Wyong, gaining a 9.5% swing. Former MP David Harris regained the seat for Labor in 2015.

== Geography ==
On its current boundaries, Wyong takes in the suburbs of Alison, Blue Haven, Bushells Ridge, Canton Beach, Cedar Brush Creek, Chittaway Bay, Chittaway Point, Dooralong, Durren Durren, Gorokan, Halloran, Hamlyn Terrace, Jilliby, Kanwal, Kiar, Lake Haven, Lemon Tree, Little Jilliby, Magenta, Mardi, Norah Head, Noraville, Palmdale, Palm Grove, Ravensdale, Rocky Point, Tacoma, Tacoma South, Toukley, Tuggerawong, Wadalba, Wallarah, Warnervale, Watanobbi, Woongarrah, Wyong, Wyongah, Wyong Creek, Yarramalong and parts of Doyalson and Tuggerah.

== Members for Wyong ==
First incarnation (1962–1973)
Member	Party	Period
Ray Maher	Labor	1962–1965
Harry Jensen	Labor	1965–1973
Second incarnation (1988–present)
Harry Moore	Labor	1988–1991
Paul Crittenden	Labor	1991–2007
David Harris	Labor	2007–2011
Darren Webber	Liberal	2011–2014
Darren Webber	Independent	2014–2015
David Harris	Labor	2015–present

== Election results ==
2023 New South Wales state election: Wyong
Party	Candidate	Votes	%	±%
Labor	David Harris	24,575	52.2	−0.3
Liberal	Matt Squires (disendorsed)	9,929	21.1	−10.4
One Nation	Martin Stevenson	6,850	14.6	+14.6
Greens	Doug Williamson	3,795	8.1	−1.3
Sustainable Australia	Susan Newbury	1,897	4.0	+4.0
Total formal votes		47,046	96.0	+1.2
Informal votes		1,968	4.0	−1.2
Turnout		49,014	86.3	−0.9
Two-party-preferred result
Labor	David Harris	27,899	69.8	+6.9
Liberal	Matt Squires (disendorsed)	12,048	30.2	−6.9
Labor hold		Swing	+6.9	
