= Kiar, New South Wales =

Kiar
- Suburb
- Interactive map of Kiar
- Coordinates: 33°12′25″S 151°26′35″E
- Country: Australia
- State: New South Wales
- City: Central Coast
- LGA: Central Coast Council
- Location: 13 km (8.1 mi) N of Wyong

Government
  - State electorate: Wyong
  - Federal division: Dobell

Population
  - Total: 25 (SAL 2021)
- Postcode: 2259
- Parish: Munmorah
Suburbs around Kiar
	Wyee
Jilliby	Kiar	Bushells Ridge
Halloran		Wallarah

Kiar is a rural locality in the northern part of the Central Coast region of New South Wales, Australia. It is part of the Central Coast Council local government area.
