= Alison, New South Wales =

Alison
- Suburb
- Interactive map of Alison
- Coordinates: 33.265°S 151.398°E
- Country: Australia
- State: New South Wales
- City: Central Coast
- LGA: Central Coast Council
- Location: 22 km (14 mi) N of Gosford; 4 km (2.5 mi) NW of Wyong; 18 km (11 mi) NW of The Entrance; 72 km (45 mi) SSW of Newcastle; 92 km (57 mi) N of Sydney

Government
  - State electorate: Wyong
  - Federal division: Dobell
- Elevation: 17 m (56 ft)

Population
  - Total: 85 (2021 census)
- Postcode: 2259
- Parish: Wyong
Suburbs around Alison
Jilliby	Jilliby	Warnervale
Wyong Creek	Alison	Wyong
Wyong Creek	Mardi	Mardi

Alison is a semi-rural suburb of the Central Coast region of New South Wales, Australia, located on the north bank of the Wyong River 4 kilometres (2.5 mi) northwest of the regional centre of Wyong. It is part of the Central Coast Council local government area.

It is named for Alison Homestead, located in Cape Road, the main building of which was extensively damaged by Arson in the early hours of 11 December 2011.
