= Newcastle Link Road =

Road in New South Wales, Australia

Newcastle Link Road New South Wales
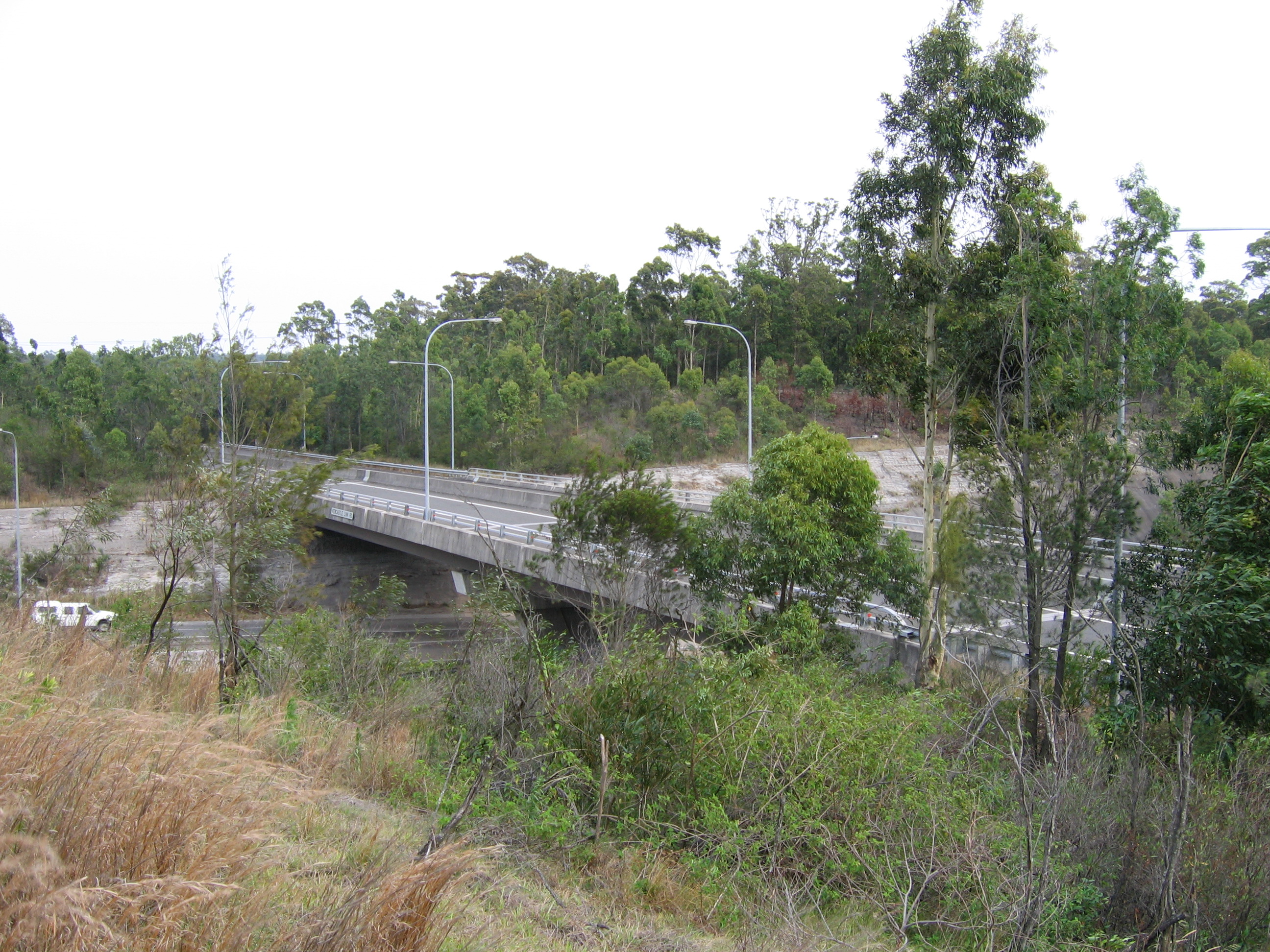
- Newcastle Link Road bridge over Pacific Motorway at Cameron Park in 2006

General information
- Type: Road
- Length: 6.9 km (4.3 mi)
- Opened: December 1993
- Gazetted: November 1996
- Route number(s): A15 (2013–present)

Major junctions
- West end: Hunter Expressway; Cameron Park, New South Wales
- Pacific Motorway; Lake Road
- East end: Thomas Street; Wallsend, New South Wales

Location(s)
- Major suburbs: Cameron Park, Wallsend

Newcastle Link Road is a limited-access road in New South Wales linking the interchange of Pacific Motorway and Hunter Expressway at Cameron Park, to Wallsend in western Newcastle. It is designated part of route A15.

== Route ==
Newcastle Link Road commences at the interchange of Pacific Motorway and Hunter Expressway northwest of Cameron Park and heads in an easterly direction as a single carriageway, four-lane road, with a thin concrete divider separating traffic, to end at Wallsend on the western edge of suburban Newcastle, completed in 1993. Traffic, and route A15, continues east past Wallsend as Thomas Street to connect directly into central Newcastle.

While the road has a 90 km/h speed limit, there are two roundabouts along the road (previously four prior to 2013). The easternmost roundabout leads nowhere as the road connecting to the roundabout, Transfield Avenue, has not yet been constructed, and was intended to connect to new housing developments north of Glendale.

== History ==
As part of the construction of the Palmers Road to Minmi section of Sydney–Newcastle Freeway (now Pacific Motorway), Newcastle Link Road was constructed through former coal mining lands west of Newcastle and opened to traffic in December 1993. It improves connectivity between Newcastle and Sydney via the freeway and relieves traffic on the Pacific Highway via Charlestown, Belmont and Swansea.

The passing of the Roads Act of 1993 through the Parliament of New South Wales updated road classifications and the way they could be declared within New South Wales. Under this act, Main Road 82 (from the intersection of Tudor and Parry Streets in Newcastle to the intersection with Newcastle Inner City Bypass and Newcastle Road in Jesmond) was extended west along Newcastle Road, Thomas Street and Newcastle Link Road to the interchange with the Sydney–Newcastle (F3) Freeway (today the Pacific Motorway) near Cameron Park, on 22 November 1996. The road today, as part of Main Road 82, still retains this declaration.

As part of the construction of Hunter Expressway, the interchange of Pacific Motorway and Newcastle Link Road was upgraded with the addition of three new bridges next to the original single bridge, maintaining the previous grade separation conditions and directly connecting into Hunter Expressway.

In preparation of the increased demand on Newcastle Link Road from the construction of Hunter Expressway, the intersections with Cameron Park Drive / Woodford Street and Lake Road / Thomas Street were upgraded from roundabouts to become traffic light controlled in 2013. In the same year, the route was also signed with the A15 number to reflect the increased status of this route into Newcastle.

In September 2025, Transport for NSW, supported by various Hunter region politicians opened a feedback portal regarding the upgrade of the intersection at Minmi Road to a full grade-separated Diamond interchange, from the current Roundabout intersection. This upgrade is supported by locals, as traffic is severe in peak commute hours. TfNSW is currently reviewing the proposal and community submissions.

== 2026 incident ==
On 3 October 2026, at the round-about at the section of Transfield Avenue, an 18 year-old P-plater driving a BMW lost control of his car and hit pedestrians whom had lined the streets to send off the Newcastle Knights, who were on their way to Sydney for the NRL Grand Final which was to take place the following day. The incident occurred at 9:30am, where 10 individuals between the ages of 2–67 were struck by the vehicle with two in a critical condition.

== Interchanges ==
LGA	Location	km	mi	Destinations	Notes
Lake Macquarie	Cameron Park	0.0	0.0	Hunter Expressway (M15) – Singleton, Muswellbrook, Tamworth	Triple-stacked interchange Western terminus of route A15, continues west along Hunter Expressway as route M15
Lake Macquarie	Cameron Park	0.0	0.0	Pacific Motorway (M1) – Taree, Gosford	No northbound exits onto Pacific Motorway
Lake Macquarie	Cameron Park	0.8	0.50	Woodford Street (north) – Minmi; Cameron Park Drive (south) – West Wallsend	Traffic lights
Lake Macquarie	Cameron Park	2.5	1.6	Minmi Road – Edgeworth, Cardiff	Roundabout
Newcastle	Wallsend	5.0	3.1	Transfield Avenue (unconstructed)	Roundabout
Newcastle	Wallsend	6.9	4.3	Lake Road (B53) – Glendale, Toronto	Traffic lights
Newcastle	Wallsend	6.9	4.3	Thomas Street (A15) – Jesmond, Hamilton, Newcastle	Route A15 continues east along Thomas Street
1.000 mi = 1.609 km; 1.000 km = 0.621 mi: Incomplete access; Route transition
