= Halloran, New South Wales =

Halloran Central Coast, New South Wales
- Coordinates: 33°13′48″S 151°26′20″E
- Population: 34 (SAL 2021)
- Postcode(s): 2259
- Location: 12 km (7 mi) NNE of Wyong
- LGA(s): Central Coast Council
- Parish: Munmorah
- State electorate(s): Wyong
- Federal division(s): Dobell
Suburbs around Halloran:
Jilliby	Jilliby	Kiar
Jilliby	Halloran	Wallarah
Warnervale	Warnervale	Wallarah

Halloran is a sparsely populated suburb of the Central Coast region of New South Wales, Australia, located off the Sydney-Newcastle Freeway between Wyong and Morisset. It is part of the Central Coast Council local government area.
