= Heddon Greta, New South Wales =

Heddon Greta City of Cessnock, New South Wales
- Coordinates: 32°48′21″S 151°30′36″E
- Population: 2,838 (SAL 2021)
- Postcode(s): 2321
- Time zone: AEST (UTC+10)
  - Summer (DST): AEDT (UTC+11)
- Location: 34 km (21 mi) W of Newcastle; 13 km (8 mi) SSW of Maitland; 165 km (103 mi) N of Sydney
- LGA(s): City of Cessnock
- Region: Hunter
- County: Northumberland
- Parish: Heddon
- State electorate(s): Cessnock
- Federal division(s): Paterson
Localities around Heddon Greta:
Loxford	Cliftleigh	Cliftleigh
Loxford	Heddon Greta	Buchanan
Kurri Kurri	Kurri Kurri	Buchanan

Heddon Greta is a suburb of the Cessnock LGA in the Hunter Region of New South Wales, Australia. At the 2016 census, its population was 2,047. It lies mainly to the north of the Hunter Expressway.

== Notable people ==
- Josh Pickering, Australian motorcycle speedway rider.
