= Highways in New South Wales =

New South Wales

The present highway network in New South Wales, Australia was established in August 1928 when the Main Roads Board (the predecessor of the Department of Main Roads, Roads & Traffic Authority and Roads & Maritime Services) superseded the 1924 main road classifications and established the basis of the existing New South Wales main road system. (the full list of main roads gazetted appears in the Government Gazette of the State of New South Wales of 17 August 1928). The number of a road for administrative purposes is not the same as the route number it carries e.g. the Great Western Highway is Highway 5 for administrative purposes but is signposted as part of route A32.)

Many major routes in New South Wales, including Sydney motorways and even some routes named as "highways" are not officially gazetted as highways. For a list of all numbered routes in New South Wales, see List of road routes in New South Wales.

While highways in many other countries are typically identified by number, highways in Australia, including New South Wales, are known mostly by names. These names typically come from 19th-century explorers, important politicians or geographic regions.

There are a number of past or current proposed roads in Sydney and NSW.

== List of gazetted highways ==
Road number	Road name	Route	Date of original gazettal	Distance	Notes
HW1	Princes Highway	Sydney to Victoria border via Wollongong	1920	1,898 km (1,179 mi)	
HW2	Hume Highway (includes Hume Motorway)	Sydney to Victoria border via Goulburn, Gundagai, Albury	1817	840 km (520 mi)	
HW3	Federal Highway	Hume Highway to Australian Capital Territory border	1931	72.7 km (45.2 mi)	
HW4	Snowy Mountains Highway	Princes Highway to Hume Highway via Cooma	1933	287 km (178 mi)	Named as Monaro Highway until 1955
HW5	Great Western Highway	Sydney to Bathurst		201 km (125 mi)	
HW6	Mid-Western Highway	Bathurst to Hay	1928	522 km (324 mi)	
HW7	Mitchell Highway	Bathurst to Queensland border via Dubbo		1,105 km (687 mi)	
HW8	Barrier Highway	Nyngan to South Australia border		1,014 km (630 mi)	
HW9	New England Highway	Pacific Highway to Queensland border via Tamworth		883 km (549 mi)	
HW10	Pacific Highway	Sydney to Queensland border via Newcastle and Coffs Harbour		780 km (480 mi)	
HW11	Oxley Highway	Pacific Highway to Mitchell Highway via Tamworth		653 km (406 mi)	
HW12	Gwydir Highway	Pacific Highway to Castlereagh Highway via Moree	1928	568 km (353 mi)	
HW13	Cumberland Highway	Liverpool to Wahroonga	1988	34 km (21 mi)	
HW14	Sturt Highway	Hume Highway to South Australia border via Wagga Wagga	8 August 1933	947 km (588 mi)	
HW15	Barton Highway	Yass to Australian Capital Territory border	1935	52 km (32 mi)	
HW16	Bruxner Highway	Pacific Highway to Newell Highway via Lismore	1959	420 km (260 mi)	
HW17	Newell Highway	Victoria border to Queensland border via Narrandera and Dubbo	March 1938	1,058 km (657 mi)	
HW18	Castlereagh Highway	Lithgow to Queensland border via Mudgee	1974	790 km (490 mi)	
HW19	Monaro Highway	Australian Capital Territory border to Victoria border via Cooma	25 March 1938	285 km (177 mi)	
HW20	Riverina Highway	Deniliquin to Victoria border		220 km (140 mi)	
HW21	Cobb Highway	Wilcannia to Victoria border		571 km (355 mi)	
HW22	Silver City Highway	Sturt Highway to Queensland border via Broken Hill		683 km (424 mi)	
HW23	Unnamed (Newcastle Inner City Bypass)	Windale to Sandgate		15.6 km (9.7 mi)	
HW24	Mount Lindesay Highway	Tenterfield to Queensland border via Woodenbong			Decommissioned 12 February 1982
HW25	Illawarra Highway	Hume Highway to Princes Highway via Moss Vale		60.7 km (37.7 mi)	
HW26	Calga to Ourimbah Expressway				Decommissioned after completion of parallel section of Pacific Motorway in 1986
HW27	Golden Highway	New England Highway to Newell Highway via Dunedoo		313 km (194 mi)	
HW28	Carnarvon Highway	Moree to Queensland border	1974	698 km (434 mi)	
HW29	Kamilaroi Highway	Bourke to New England Highway		605 km (376 mi)	
HW30	Central Coast Highway	Pacific Motorway to Pacific Highway via Gosford	9 August 2006	50 km (31 mi)	
HW31	Gold Coast Highway	Pacific Motorway to Queensland border	1 May 2009	39.8 km (24.7 mi)	
Decommissioned

== See also ==
- Highways in Australia for highways in other states and territories
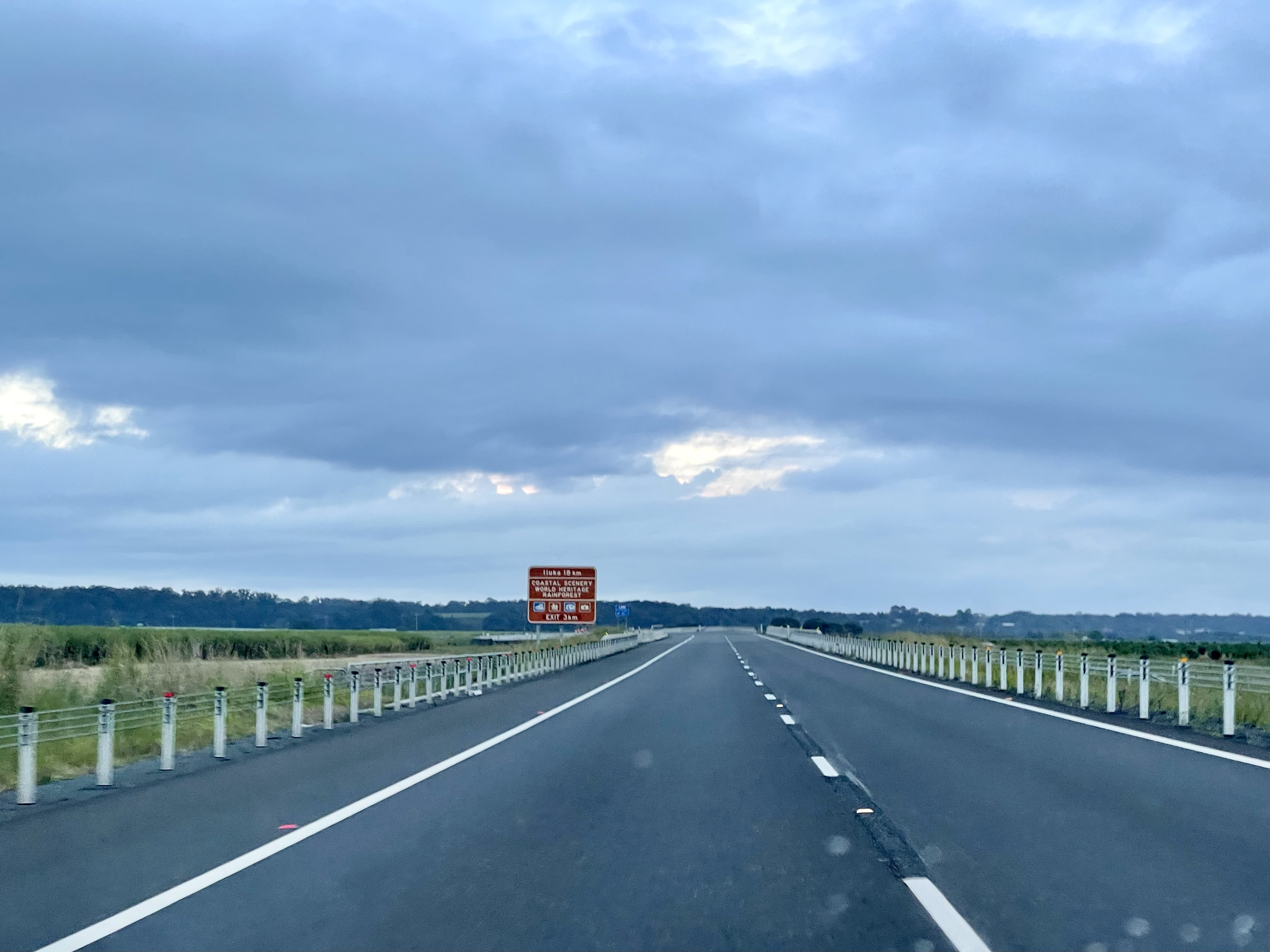
- List of highways in Australia for roads named as highways, but not necessarily classified as highways
- List of road routes in New South Wales for all major routes in New South Wales
