= Buchanan, New South Wales =

Buchanan Cessnock, New South Wales
- Coordinates: 32°49′19″S 151°31′48″E
- Population: 212 (2021 census)
- Gazetted: 23 October 2015 (locality)
- Postcode(s): 2323
- Elevation: 22 m (72 ft)
- Time zone: AEST (UTC+10)
  - Summer (DST): AEST (UTC+11)
- Location: 10.4 km (6 mi) S of Maitland; 26.4 km (16 mi) NW of Newcastle; 120.4 km (75 mi) NNW of Sydney
- LGA(s): Cesnock; Maitland
- Region: Hunter
- State electorate(s): Cessnock
- Federal division(s): Paterson; Hunter
Suburbs around Buchanan:
Cliftleigh	Louth Park	Black Hill
Heddon Greta	Buchanan	Buttai
Pelaw Main	Richmond Vale	Stockrington

Buchanan is a locality in the City of Maitland and City of Cessnock, New South Wales, Australia. It is approximately half farmland and half forested. It was notable as being the intersection of the roads between Maitland, Beresfield, Kurri and Edgeworth. It is the preferred location for a regional freight hub. In 2021, the population was 212, median age was 38 and 88% were born in Australia.

== Roads ==
The Hunter Expressway runs through Buchanan. There is a rest stop on the Expressway here, just to the south of the John Renshaw Drive interchange. Mount Vincent Road, starting at East Maitland, changes its name to be Buchanan Road and ends in the middle of Buchanan. The Hunter Expressway required four bridges to cross over Buchanan road; two for the through traffic, and one for the expressway's off-ramp southbound and on-ramp north bound.

George Booth Drive starts where Buchanan Road ends and heads south past Mount Sugarloaf, to Seahampton and Edgeworth. Buchanan Road and George Booth Drive now meet at a new roundabout, which also intersects with John Renshaw Drive. John Renshaw Drive runs through Buchanan, from Beresfield to Stanford Merthyr, connecting to Kurri Kurri and the Cessnock area.

John Renshaw Drive crosses over the Hunter Expressway by the way of a circular bridge that forms an elevated roundabout and there are entrances and exits to the expressway in several directions.
