= Louth Park, New South Wales =

Louth Park Maitland, New South Wales
- Coordinates: 32°45′24″S 151°33′24″E
- Population: 922 (2021 census)
- Postcode(s): 2320
- Time zone: AEST (UTC)
  - Summer (DST): AEDT (UTC)
- Location: 164 km (102 mi) N of Sydney; 36 km (22 mi) NW of Newcastle; 5 km (3 mi) S of Maitland
- LGA(s): City of Maitland
- Region: Hunter
- County: Northumberland
- Parish: Maitland
- State electorate(s): Maitland
- Federal division(s): Paterson
Suburbs around Louth Park:
Horseshoe Bend	South Maitland	East Maitland
Gillieston Heights	Louth Park	East Maitland
Cliftleigh	Buchanan	Black Hill

Louth Park is a suburb of the City of Maitland in the Hunter Region of New South Wales, Australia.
