= AusLink =

Transport funding program in Australia

AusLink is a former Government of Australia land transport funding program, that operated between June 2004 and 2009. The former program was administered by the former Department of Transport & Regional Services. In 2009, the program was replaced with the Nation Building Program under the Nation Building Program (National Land Transport) Act 2009. The Nation Building Program was administered by the Department of Infrastructure & Transport and that program was replaced by The National Land Transport Network, as determined by the Minister for Infrastructure & Regional Development under the National Land Transport Act 2014.

== Legislative Framework ==
AusLink was administered under the AusLink (National Land Transport) Act 2005, until the 2005 legislation was superseded by the Infrastructure Australia Act 2008, the Nation Building and Jobs Plan (State Infrastructure Delivery) Act 2009, the Nation-building Funds Act 2008 and the Nation Building Program (National Land Transport) Act 2009.

== Road funding ==
Major projects completed as part of the AusLink program and information on the funding projects in the states and territories

=== Sydney to Melbourne ===
- Hume Highway Holbrook bypass ($320m: $110m contribution by NSW) - completed in August 2013.
- Hume Freeway Craigieburn bypass ($320m: $110m contribution by Vic) - completed in December 2005.

=== Brisbane to Sydney ===
- Pacific Highway Bulahdelah bypass ($315m: $11m contribution by NSW) - construction completed in 2013.
- Pacific Highway Kempsey bypass ($618m) - Construction completed in 2014.
- Pacific Highway Sapphire to Woolgoolga upgrade ($700m: $88m contribution by NSW) - 25 km upgrade north of Coffs Harbour, construction completed in 2014.
- Pacific Highway Ballina bypass ($640m: $114 contribution by NSW) - Construction completed in 2012.
- Pacific Highway Banora Point upgrade ($360m: $60m contribution by NSW) - Construction completed in 2012.
- Hunter Expressway ($1.7bn: $200m contribution by NSW). Construction completed 2013.

=== Melbourne to Adelaide ===
- Western Highway Melton to Bacchus Marsh Freeway ($450m) - Construction completed in 2012.

=== Brisbane to Darwin ===
- Toowoomba Bypass ($43m) - Planning commenced in 2008.

=== Dubbo to Sydney ===
- Great Western Highway Woodford to Wentworth Falls duplication - due for completion in 2014

=== Canberra connectors ===
- Barton Highway duplication - construction start date not announced (as of June 2014)
- Murrumbateman Bypass ($20m) - project funding not yet approved.

== Rail funding ==
Rail funding has been announced for the following projects (Auslink project search)

- $550 million from AusLink and additional Australian Rail Track Corporation funds for an upgrade the 684 km of AusLink Network track and signalling along the North Coast railway line from Maitland to Brisbane to reduce transit times substantially and to permit more trains to operate safely on the largely single track line.
- $192 million through the Australian Rail Track Corporation for a new access route for freight trains through the south-western Sydney metropolitan area from Macarthur to Chullora, the Southern Sydney Freight Line project.
- $110 million on the RailCorp metropolitan track system towards improving rail access for freight trains on the Main Northern railway line between Strathfield and Hornsby as part of the Northern Sydney Freight Corridor project. Some of these funds will be available during the later part of the current five-year AusLink investment programme, for the development of the Port Botany rail link.
- $110 million to the Government of Victoria for a new rail link and grade separation from Footscray Road between the Dynon intermodal freight precinct and the Port of Melbourne.
- $45 million to convert the broad gauge line between Geelong and Mildura and the North East railway line between Melbourne and Albury to standard gauge.
- $42 million to the Australian Rail Track Corporation to extend the Code Division Multiple Access mobile phone system to cover the interstate rail network. This will achieve a single national media for voice and data communications for the non-metropolitan interstate rail system. This is being provided through Telstra and will later need to be converted to 3GSM when Telstra replaces its CDMA network with 3GSM.
- $40 million to the Australian Rail Track Corporation towards the cost of the line upgrading and signalling system between Tottenham and West Footscray.
- $20.3 million to the Australian Rail Track Corporation to develop Australia's next generation of train control technology, including the capacity for computerised on-board signalling to replace the current track-side system, satellite-based location technology to track trains to within 3 metres, and a computerised warning system that alerts drivers to impending dangers.
- $20 million towards a Wodonga rail bypass to remove the North East railway line running through the centre of Wodonga.
- $8 million for crossing loop extensions at Jamestown and Mingary on the Crystal Brook-Broken Hill railway line at Yarrabandia and Matakana on the Broken Hill railway line.
- Up to $5 million from for a major study of the Inland Rail corridor between Melbourne, Sydney and Brisbane. The study will examine future freight demand, capacity and options for development of the north–south rail corridor. It will form part of the broader AusLink corridor study of transport links between Melbourne, Sydney and Brisbane.
- $4 million for new passing loops at Mungala and Haig on the Trans-Australian Railway.
- $3.5 million for the upgrade and strengthening of the Albury-Wodonga Railway Bridge.
- $2.6 million for the installation of an In-Cab Activated Points System to avoid the need for train crew to manually change switches (railroad switches).
- $2.5 million for the upgrading and strengthening of the Murray River Bridge at Murray Bridge, South Australia.

== Criticism ==
The program was criticised as being a pork barrelling exercise.

== See also ==
- One Nation (Infrastructure)
- National Highway (Australia)
