= Jilliby =

- Suburb
- Interactive map of Jilliby
- Coordinates: 33°14′56″S 151°23′6″E
- Country: Australia
- State: New South Wales
- City: Central Coast
- LGA: Central Coast Council
- Location: 66 km (41 mi) SW of Newcastle; 29 km (18 mi) N of Gosford; 8 km (5.0 mi) NNW of Wyong; 99 km (62 mi) N of Sydney; 26 km (16 mi) WNW of The Entrance

Government
  - State electorate: Wyong
  - Federal division: Dobell
- Elevation: 25 m (82 ft)

Population
  - Total: 1,646 (2016 census)
- Postcode: 2259
- Parish: Wyong
Suburbs around Jilliby
Ravensdale	Mandalong	Halloran
Ravensdale	Jilliby	Warnervale
Yarramalong	Wyong Creek	Alison

Jilliby (/dʒɪləbi/ JIL-ə-bee) is a large rural locality with farms and bushland that is located in the Dooralong Valley of the Central Coast region of New South Wales, Australia. It is part of the Central Coast Council local government area.

== Population ==
In the 2016 Census, there were 1,646 people in Jilliby. 83.1% of people were born in Australia and 91.2% of people spoke only Australian English at home. The most common responses for religion were Catholic (25.7%), Anglican (24.2%) and no religion (22.9%).
