= Dora Creek, New South Wales =

Dora Creek
- Suburb
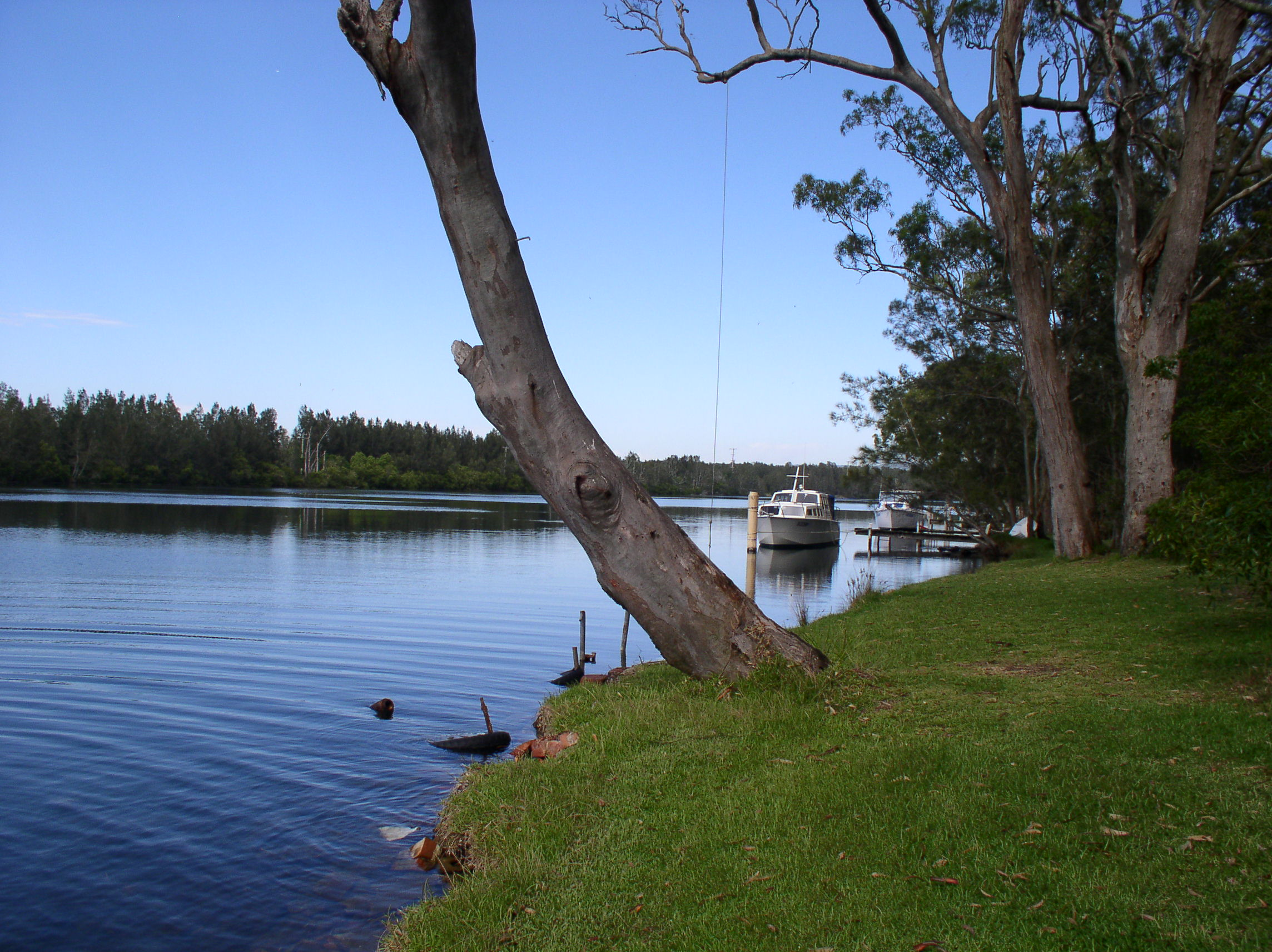
- Scenery from the bank of Dora Creek

- Coordinates: 33°4′55″S 151°30′4″E
- Country: Australia
- State: New South Wales
- LGA: City of Lake Macquarie
- Location: 5 km (3.1 mi) NNE of Morisset; 41 km (25 mi) SW of Newcastle; 39 km (24 mi) N of The Entrance; 31 km (19 mi) N of Wyong; 120 km (75 mi) N of Sydney

Government
  - State electorate: Lake Macquarie
  - Federal division: Hunter

Area
  - Total: 2.3 km^{2} (0.89 sq mi)
- Elevation: 3 m (9.8 ft)

Population
  - Total: 1,739 (2021 census)
  - Density: 756/km^{2} (1,960/sq mi)
- Postcode: 2264
- Parish: Coorumbung
Suburbs around Dora Creek
Freemans Waterhole	Awaba	Eraring
Cooranbong	Dora Creek	Lake Macquarie
Mandalong	Morisset	Bonnells Bay

Dora Creek is a small rural suburb of the City of Lake Macquarie in New South Wales, Australia, located west of Lake Macquarie in New South Wales and north of the town of Morisset.

== Location and features ==
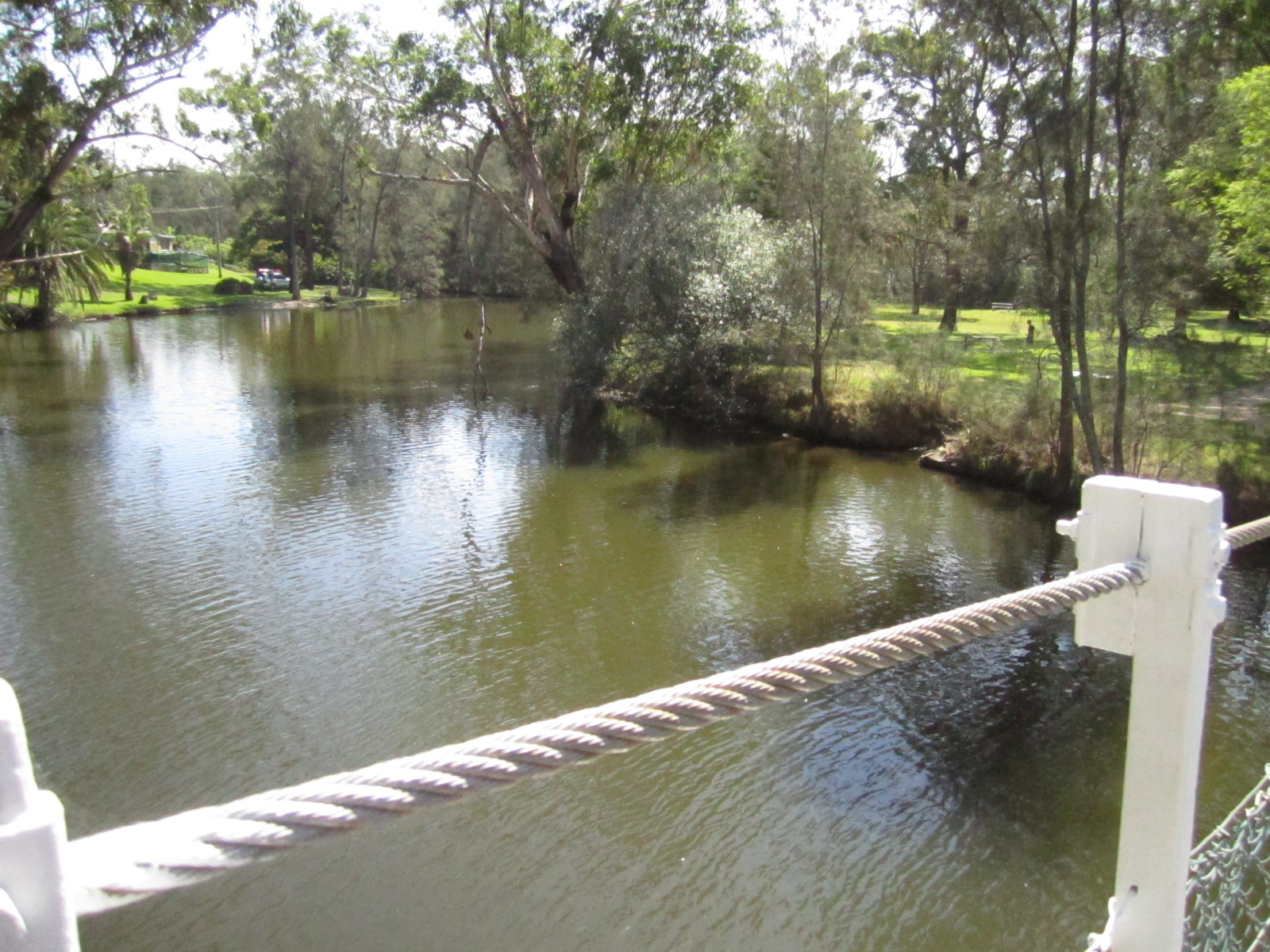
Dora Creek, view from behind Avondale College

Dora Creek is named for the creek running through its centre, and was originally known as Doree Doree in the local Aboriginal language, which means "Creek running into a lake".

There is an interesting geological phenomena at Dora Creek's connection to the lake. The banks of the creek have formed into two peninsula jutting out into the lake like a point. Thus the aboriginal name is explained, the creek is literally in a lake—the points are merely the banks of the creek! The sediment deposited by the creek has not formed a large flood plain or river delta, but has left behind two banks. This is where the agitation of the lake by winds causes enough erosion to wash away the flood plain that would otherwise appear at the delta or near were a creek floods. However the erosion caused by the lake's waves is not enough to erode away the clay sediments that deposit on the banks of the creek. For that reason, the banks of the creek have grown due to flooding, and appear now as two points, with a creek inside. Similar structures can be seen at creeks nearby too, with good examples at Stoney Creek, Lake Street, Blackalls Park, which is more clearly a type of river delta, where the flat land is created by floods deposition, and at Wyong Creek in a lake a little south, where a similar "two points with creek inside" or "creek in lake", is in existence, but they are smaller and demonstrating how the points grow.

The Lake Macquarie Council has placed emphasis on the Dora Creek environment, carrying out major foreshore restoration works, and educating the public about the protection of creeks and waterways. It is known for its scenery and proximity to the Watagan Mountains. It is close to the Sydney–Newcastle Pacific Motorway and Dora Creek railway station.

== Population ==
In the 2016 Census, there were 1,643 people in Dora Creek. 82.1% of people were born in Australia and 92.8% of people spoke only English at home. The most common responses for religion were No Religion 31.4%, Anglican 23.9% and Catholic 17.8%.
