= Cooranbong, New South Wales =

Cooranbong
- Suburb
- Coordinates: 33°04′26″S 151°27′04″E
- Country: Australia
- State: New South Wales
- City: Greater Newcastle
- LGA: City of Lake Macquarie
- Location: 6 km (3.7 mi) NW of Morisset; 118 km (73 mi) N of Sydney; 50 km (31 mi) SW of Newcastle; 40 km (25 mi) N of The Entrance; 31 km (19 mi) N of Wyong
- Established: 1826

Government
  - State electorate: Lake Macquarie
  - Federal division: Hunter

Area
  - Total: 4.5 km^{2} (1.7 sq mi)
- Elevation: 20 m (66 ft)

Population
  - Total: 7,077 (2021 census)
  - Density: 1,573/km^{2} (4,070/sq mi)
- Postcode: 2265
- Parish: Coorumbung
Suburbs around Cooranbong
| Martinsville | Freemans Waterhole | Awaba |
| Martinsville | Cooranbong | Dora Creek |
| Lemon Tree | Mandalong | Morisset |

Cooranbong (/kɔːrənbɒŋ/ KOR-ən-BONG) is a town in a suburb of the City of Lake Macquarie, Greater Newcastle in New South Wales, Australia, west of the town of Morisset off the M1 Pacific Motorway. Cooranbong is surrounded by the Watagans National Park.

The town's name is derived from the Aboriginal word "Kour-an-bong", meaning "rocky bottom creek" or "water over rocks".

There is a particularly large Seventh-day Adventist presence in Cooranbong. As of the 2021 census, 23.5% of the suburb is Seventh-day Adventist, which is higher than every other religious denomination besides "no religion".

== History ==
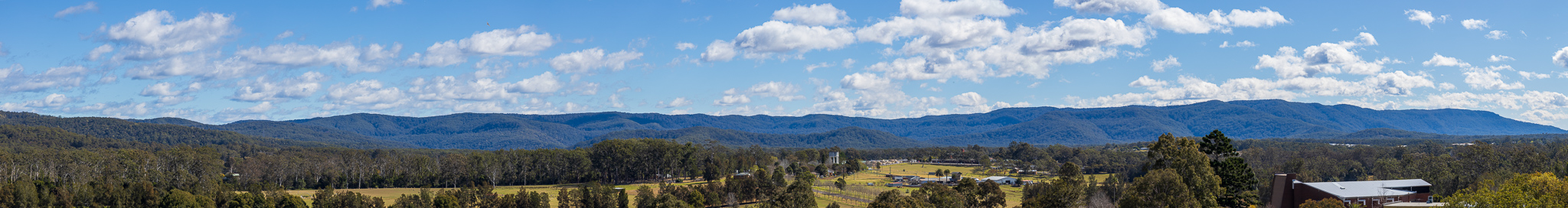
The Watagan Mountains west of Cooranbong.

The Aboriginal people, in this area, the Awabakal, were the first people of this land.

Prior to settlement and development of the area now known as Cooranbong, lived people who identify as part of the Awabakal group. It is unknown as to how long the people lived collectively as a single group and the nature of their interactions through peace and conflict with other people not of their own kin.

The first modern settler was Lieutenant Percy Simpson, who received a 2,000-acre (809 ha) land grant from the government and was assigned six convicts who cleared the land, grazed cattle and built a homestead near Dora Creek. Although Simpson only stayed there for two years, one of his convicts, Moses Carroll, became a stockman in the area, eventually becoming the area's police constable. The Robertson Land Act of 1861 allowed the town to grow, encouraging the construction of a Catholic church and later, a school, police station and courthouse (1873), a post office (1881) and an Anglican church. Timber cutting was the primary economic activity, during the 1880s the population reached 700. When the railway was built from Sydney to Newcastle in the 1880s, the line passed around 5 km east of the town centre. The station and associated settlement were originally labelled as Cooranbong but later became known as Morisset. This was devastating to the local economy in conjunction with the significant economic depression occurring in the colony. Consequently, the population declined to 206 people by 1891. This economic depression continued until the Seventh-day Adventist Church bought 1,500 acres (607 ha) on the northern bank of Dora Creek where they built Avondale School for Christian Workers (1897) and Sanitarium Health Food Company (1909).

== Present day ==
Cooranbong, located at the foothills of the Watagan Mountains, has seen rapid growth, particularly due to the development of the Watagan Park estate. This master-planned community, developed by the Johnson Property Group, has attracted over 1,000 families to the area, with another 2,000 expected to move in over the next 7-8 years. Watagan Park’s appeal lies in its proximity to nature, recreational activities, and educational facilities like Avondale School and Avondale University.

The estate includes a Town Centre development, which is currently under construction and scheduled to open in late 2025. This centre will feature 23 specialty shops, a Woolworths supermarket, and a range of housing options, catering to the growing demand for high-quality, family-friendly living in the region. With significant investments in infrastructure and amenities, Cooranbong is quickly becoming one of the fastest-growing regions in the Lake Macquarie area.

Johnson Property Group, led by developer Keith Johnson, is committed to enhancing the quality of life for residents, with plans for further expansion, including parks, hiking and biking trails, and easy access to Lake Macquarie for boating and water sports. The development aims to create a self-sufficient community with a strong focus on lifestyle, convenience, and connection to nature.

The Avondale Estate is a Seventh-day Adventist owned estate opposite the Cooranbong shops. The estate is home to Avondale University, a Seventh-day Adventist tertiary education institution, the Sanitarium Health and Wellbeing Company, Avondale College Church, Avondale Memorial Church, a disused dairy farm and Avondale Retirement Village. A number of Avondale University students and staff also live on the estate in off-campus housing.

There is also St Patrick's & St Brigid's Catholic Church, a small church built in 1906 to replace the original 1861 structure. The oldest headstone in its cemetery dates to 1862.

== Sunnyside Historic Home ==
Sunnyside Historic Home was constructed by Seventh-day Adventist Church co-founder Ellen G. White and served as her home base for six years while she lived in Australia (1895–1900). It originally sat on 40 acres of land Mrs White bought from the church for $1,350 in an effort to provide needed funds for the school development. The home was where she wrote significant portions of her most popular books, including The Desire of Ages, a work on the life of Christ. Ellen White was instrumental in founding Avondale College, and the home sits near the campus. It was bought by the Australasian (now South Pacific) Division in 1960, and they restored Sunnyside. The home is available for tours.

== Climate ==
Cooranbong has a humid subtropical climate (Cfa) with warm summers and mild winters.

Climate data for Cooranbong (2008–present)
| Month | Jan | Feb | Mar | Apr | May | Jun | Jul | Aug | Sep | Oct | Nov | Dec | Year |
|---|---|---|---|---|---|---|---|---|---|---|---|---|---|
| Record high °C (°F) | 45.2 (113.4) | 42.5 (108.5) | 38.8 (101.8) | 34.6 (94.3) | 29.0 (84.2) | 25.4 (77.7) | 25.6 (78.1) | 29.4 (84.9) | 34.8 (94.6) | 37.1 (98.8) | 41.2 (106.2) | 43.0 (109.4) | 45.2 (113.4) |
| Mean daily maximum °C (°F) | 28.7 (83.7) | 28.1 (82.6) | 26.8 (80.2) | 24.3 (75.7) | 21.3 (70.3) | 18.5 (65.3) | 18.6 (65.5) | 20.0 (68.0) | 22.8 (73.0) | 24.3 (75.7) | 25.9 (78.6) | 27.5 (81.5) | 23.9 (75.0) |
| Mean daily minimum °C (°F) | 17.9 (64.2) | 17.4 (63.3) | 16.0 (60.8) | 12.0 (53.6) | 8.0 (46.4) | 6.6 (43.9) | 5.1 (41.2) | 5.3 (41.5) | 8.0 (46.4) | 11.0 (51.8) | 14.1 (57.4) | 16.1 (61.0) | 11.5 (52.7) |
| Record low °C (°F) | 8.8 (47.8) | 10.0 (50.0) | 7.1 (44.8) | 4.2 (39.6) | −0.8 (30.6) | −2.8 (27.0) | −3.4 (25.9) | −2.1 (28.2) | 0.6 (33.1) | 3.0 (37.4) | 5.7 (42.3) | 7.5 (45.5) | −3.4 (25.9) |
| Average precipitation mm (inches) | 107.1 (4.22) | 132.5 (5.22) | 157.5 (6.20) | 105.6 (4.16) | 56.6 (2.23) | 94.8 (3.73) | 70.5 (2.78) | 48.0 (1.89) | 59.6 (2.35) | 90.0 (3.54) | 103.2 (4.06) | 84.7 (3.33) | 1,107.9 (43.62) |
| Average precipitation days (≥ 1.0 mm) | 8.4 | 9.8 | 10.8 | 8.8 | 6.6 | 8.6 | 6.6 | 4.9 | 6.1 | 8.5 | 8.4 | 9.0 | 96.5 |
Source: Bureau of Meteorology

== Education ==
- Cooranbong Public School (P-6, public)
- Avondale School (P-12, private Christian)
- Avondale University (University level degrees, private Christian)

== Demographics ==
According to the 2016 census of Population, there were 5,449 people in Cooranbong.

- The median age of Cooranbong residents was 43 years, compared with 38 years as the News South Wales median.
- 77.7% of people were born in Australia. The next most common countries of birth were New Zealand 4.6% and England 2.5%.
- 88.3% of people spoke only English at home.
- The most common responses for religion were Seventh-day Adventist 30.8%, No Religion 19.1%, Anglican 13.7% and Catholic 10.8%.
- The median weekly household income was $1,232.

== Notable residents ==
- Lindy Chamberlain (born 1948), known for her famous trial, being erroneously accused of killing her nine-week-old daughter, Azaria, while camping at Ayers Rock in 1980.
- Michael Chamberlain (1944–2017), ex-husband of Lindy, erroneously accused of being accessory in the death of Azaria, pastor, teacher, writer.
- Elsa Klensch (1930–2022) fashion journalist and television presenter (Style with Elsa Klensch) born in Cooranbong.
- Ellen G. White (1827–1915), known for co-founding the seventh-day Adventist church, lived here founding Avondale School.
