= Dora Creek =

Dora Creek Dora creek
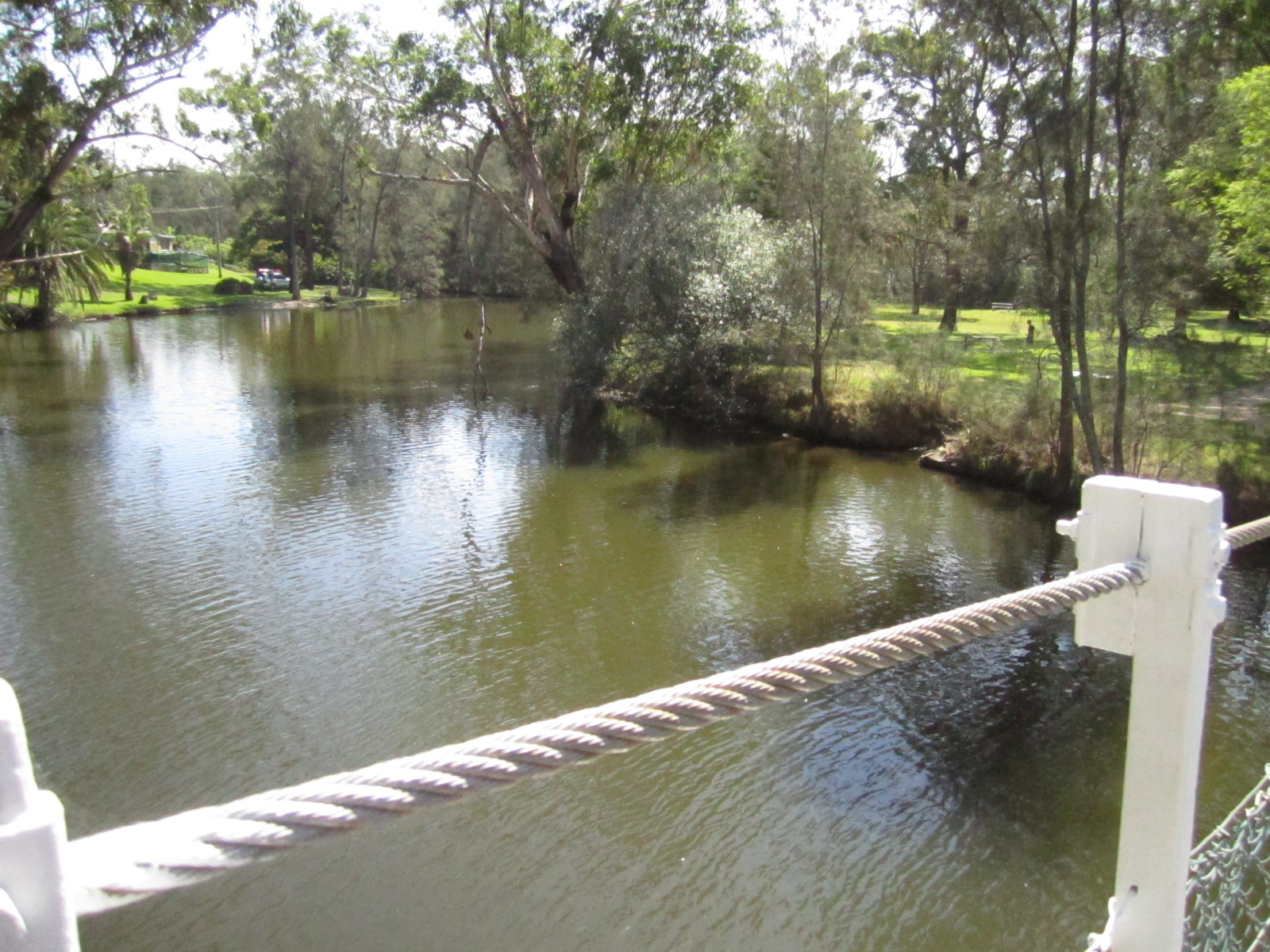
- Dora Creek, view from behind Avondale College
- Etymology: Aboriginal: "Creek running into a lake"
- Native name: Doree Doree

Location
- Country: Australia
- State: New South Wales
- Region: Hunter
- Local government area: City of Lake Macquarie

Physical characteristics
- Source: Watagan Mountains
  - location: Martinsville
  - coordinates: 33.05698°S 151.33437°E
  - elevation: 40 m (130 ft)
- Mouth: Lake Macquarie
  - location: Dora Creek
  - coordinates: 33.08358°S 151.53353°E
  - elevation: 0 m (0 ft)
- Length: 22.5 km (14.0 mi)

Basin features
- Progression: Lake Macquarie → Swansea Channel → Tasman Sea
- Tributaries
  - left: Jigadee Creek
  - right: Stockton Creek
- National park: Watagans

Dora Creek is a watercourse that is located in Greater Newcastle in the Hunter region of New South Wales, Australia.

== Course and features ==
Dora Creek River rises below Watagan Mountains west of Martinsville, and flows generally southeast by south, joined by two minor tributaries, before reaching its river mouth within Lake Macquarie, near the town of Dora Creek. The river descends 40 metres (130 ft) over its 22.5 kilometres (14.0 mi) course.

The merged flows of Dora Creek together with Lake Macquarie reaches the Tasman Sea of the South Pacific Ocean at Swansea.

The F3 Freeway crosses the creek, west of Morisset.

== See also ==
- Eraring Power Station
- List of rivers of Australia
- List of rivers of New South Wales (A–K)
- Rivers of New South Wales
