= Morisset Park =

- Suburb
- Coordinates: 33°07′16″S 151°32′06″E
- Country: Australia
- State: New South Wales
- LGA: City of Lake Macquarie
- Location: 6 km (3.7 mi) ESE of Morisset
- Established: 1878

Government
  - State electorate: Lake Macquarie
  - Federal division: Hunter

Population
  - Total: 1,085 (2021 census)
- Postcode: 2264
- Parish: Morisset
Suburbs around Morisset Park
Bonnells Bay	Windermere Park	Brightwaters
Bonnells Bay	Morisset Park	Lake Macquarie
	Morisset

Morisset Park is a suburb of the City of Lake Macquarie in New South Wales, Australia on a peninsula east of the town of Morisset on the western side of Lake Macquarie.

== History ==
J.A. Gorrick, an early settler, became the father-in-law of the actor Bert Bailey in 1902. Bailey then purchased Gorrick's land and built an eighteen-room house there, known as The Bluff. In 1934, the property was acquired by the Little Company of Mary, who nursed tuberculosis patients there. In 1947, the Brothers of St John of God acquired the site and ran a special school for boys.
