= Morisset railway station =

Railway station in New South Wales, Australia

Morisset
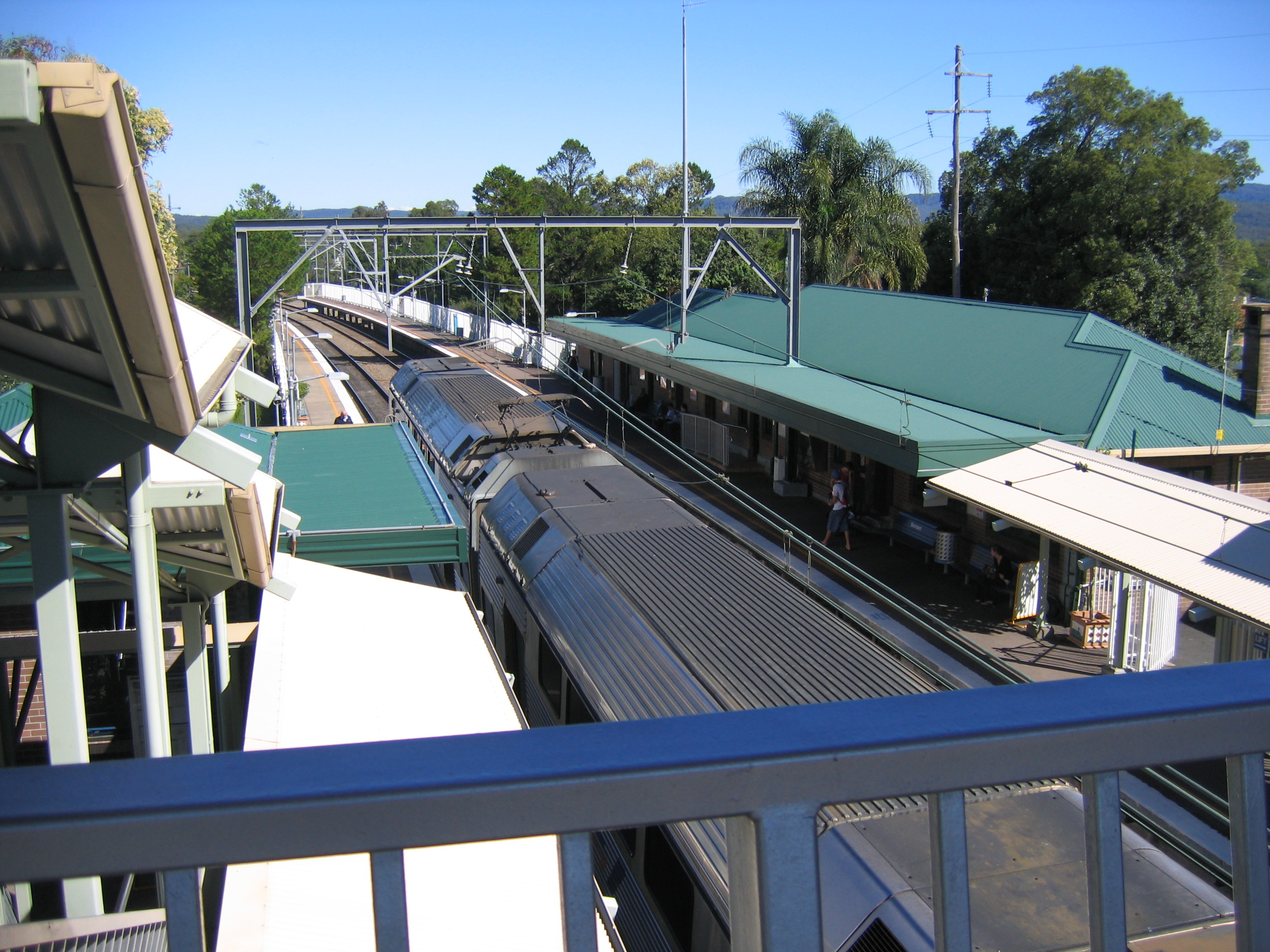
- Southbound view of the station platforms, May 2007

General information
- Location: Dora Street, Morisset; Australia
- Coordinates: 33°06′33″S 151°29′15″E
- Elevation: 38 metres (125 ft)
- Owner: Transport Asset Manager of New South Wales
- Operator: Sydney Trains
- Line: Main Northern
- Distance: 123.33 km (76.63 mi) from Central
- Platforms: 2 side
- Tracks: 2
- Connections: Bus

Construction
- Structure type: Ground
- Accessible: Yes

Other information
- Status: Staffed
- Station code: MOI
- Website: Transport for NSW

History
- Opened: 15 August 1887; 139 years ago
- Former names: Morrisset (1887–1889)

Passengers
- 2025: 373,090 (year); 1,022 (daily) (Sydney Trains, NSW TrainLink)

Services
Preceding station	Intercity Trains	Following station
Dora Creek towards Newcastle Interchange	Central Coast & Newcastle Line	Wyee towards Central
Fassifern towards Newcastle Interchange	Central Coast & Newcastle Line Express	Wyong towards Central
Fassifern towards Newcastle Interchange	Central Coast & Newcastle Line Express	Wyee Weekends only towards Central
Location

Morisset railway station is a heritage-listed railway station located on the Main Northern line in New South Wales, Australia. It serves the City of Lake Macquarie town of Morisset opening on 15 August 1887 as Morrisset before being renamed Morisset on 1 February 1889.

Until October 2013 it was the terminating point for many local services from the old Newcastle station, however these now all continue to Gosford and Sydney.

The remnants of the former freight yard are immediately north of the station including a southbound refuge loop.

== Platforms and services ==
Morriset has two side platforms. It is serviced by Sydney Trains Intercity Central Coast & Newcastle Line services travelling between Sydney Central, Gosford and Newcastle.

Platform	Line	Stopping pattern	Notes
1	CCN	Services to Gosford & Sydney Central	
2	CCN	Services to Newcastle	

== Transport links ==
Busways operates one bus route via Morisset station, under contract to Transport for NSW:

- 95: to Lake Haven via Gwandalan & Mannering Park (Weekdays only)

Hunter Valley Buses operates five bus routes via Morisset station, under contract to Transport for NSW:

- 275: to Toronto via Wangi Wangi
- 278: to Silverwater
- 279: to Sunshine
- 280: to Cooranbong
- 281: from Lake Haven to Wangi Wangi (Fridays only)

Rover Coaches operates one bus route twice daily to and from Morisset station, under contract to Transport for NSW:

- 163: to Cessnock via Kurri Kurri
