= Lemon Tree, New South Wales =

Lemon Tree
- Suburb
- Interactive map of Lemon Tree
- Coordinates: 33°08′54″S 151°22′04″E
- Country: Australia
- State: New South Wales
- Region: Central Coast
- City: Central Coast
- LGA: Central Coast Council
- Location: 108 km (67 mi) N of Sydney; 20 km (12 mi) NW of Wyong; 36 km (22 mi) NNW of The Entrance; 40 km (25 mi) N of Gosford; 71 km (44 mi) SW of Newcastle

Government
  - State electorate: Wyong
  - Federal division: Dobell
- Elevation: 43 m (141 ft)

Population
  - Total: 385 (2011 census)
- Time zone: UTC+10 (AEST)
  - Summer (DST): UTC+11 (AEDT)
- Postcode: 2259
- County: Northumberland
- Parish: Olney
Suburbs around Lemon Tree
Olney	Martinsville	Morisset
Ravensdale	Lemon Tree	Mandalong
Dooralong	Dooralong	Durren Durren

Lemon Tree is a rural suburb of the Central Coast Council local government area in the Central Coast region of New South Wales, Australia. At the 2011 census, Lemon Tree, along with the adjacent suburbs of Durren Durren and Dooralong, had a combined population of 385.

== See also ==
- Lemon Tree Passage, New South Wales
