= Bonnells Bay =

- Suburb
- Coordinates: 33°5′53″S 151°31′5″E
- Country: Australia
- State: New South Wales
- LGA: City of Lake Macquarie
- Location: 4 km (2.5 mi) E of Morisset; 31 km (19 mi) NNE of Wyong; 118 km (73 mi) NNE of Sydney; 47 km (29 mi) SW of Newcastle; 40 km (25 mi) N of The Entrance
- Established: 1886

Government
  - State electorate: Lake Macquarie
  - Federal division: Hunter

Area
  - Total: 2.2 km^{2} (0.85 sq mi)
- Elevation: 25 m (82 ft)

Population
  - Total: 4,066 (2021 census)
  - Density: 1,850/km^{2} (4,790/sq mi)
- Postcode: 2264
- Parish: Morisset
Suburbs around Bonnells Bay
Morisset	Lake Macquarie	Yarrawonga Park
Morisset	Bonnells Bay	Yarrawonga Park
Morisset Park	Windermere Park	Brightwaters

Bonnells Bay is a suburb of the City of Lake Macquarie in New South Wales, Australia on a peninsula east of the town of Morisset on the western side of Lake Macquarie.

== History ==
The town, known as Morisset East until 1948, is named after the Bonnell family, particularly William F. Bonnell, the first settlers of the majority of what is today Bonnells Bay and parts of Windermere Park and Morisset Park. The Bonnell family also have a bay which is part of Lake Macquarie named after them, Bonnells Bay. The Bonnell family owned what is today all of Woods Point, now a national park and parts of the northern grounds of Morisset Hospital over north to the Lake Macquarie foreshore of what is now Bonnells Bay. The Bonnell family are not in relation to the early settlers of Mandalong the James C. Bonnells.

The area was subdivided in 1886, but no township was established until after World War II. The township grew, and a small shopping centre built, after the development of the Eraring Power Station in the 1980s. A school operated from 1912 onwards.

Bonnells Bay has grown considerably since World War II, the school which opened in 1912, Bonnells Bay Public School has grown to capacity, large proportions of the suburb are increasingly being subdivided and the shopping centre now consists of a newly developed 'The Bay Shopping Centre' with a Club, Coles, Post office and many convenience stores.

== Population ==
According to the 2016 census, there were 3,578 people in Bonnells Bay.

- Aboriginal and Torres Strait Islander people made up 4.3% of the population.
- 83.2% of people were born in Australia. The next most common country of birth was England at 3.2%.
- 92.1% of people spoke only English at home.
- The most common responses for religion No Religion 26.5%, Anglican 20.5%, Catholic 19.9% and Seventh-day Adventist 7.8%.
