= Mandalong =

- Suburb
- Coordinates: 33°07′55″S 151°25′34″E
- Country: Australia
- State: New South Wales
- LGA: City of Lake Macquarie
- Location: 3 km (1.9 mi) WSW of Morisset; 25 km (16 mi) N of Wyong; 55 km (34 mi) SW of Newcastle; 43 km (27 mi) N of The Entrance; 116 km (72 mi) N of Sydney
- Established: 1852

Government
  - State electorate: Lake Macquarie
  - Federal division: Hunter
- Elevation: 25 m (82 ft)

Population
  - Total: 433 (2021 census)
- Postcode: 2264
- Parish: Mandolong
Suburbs around Mandalong
Martinsville	Cooranbong	Morisset
Lemon Tree	Mandalong	Morisset
Dooralong	Wyee	Wyee

Mandalong is a small rural town in the City of Lake Macquarie in New South Wales, Australia, located near the town of Morisset and west of Lake Macquarie.

== History ==
The Aboriginal people the Awabakal were the first people in this area. It was settled by Europeans in 1852 or earlier. Early industries were farming and timber working.

Today Mandalong is a quiet rural area. It is close to the Sydney-Newcastle Freeway and the Watagan Mountains. The nearest shops and railway station are in Morisset.
