= Martinsville, New South Wales =

Martinsville New South Wales
- Coordinates: 33°03′25″S 151°24′36″E
- Population: 389 (2021 census)
- Established: 1860s
- Postcode(s): 2265
- Elevation: 23 m (75 ft)
- Location: 8 km (5 mi) NW of Morisset; 51 km (32 mi) SW of Newcastle; 44 km (27 mi) N of The Entrance; 52 km (32 mi) N of Gosford; 122 km (76 mi) N of Sydney
- LGA(s): City of Lake Macquarie
- Parish: Dora
- State electorate(s): Lake Macquarie
- Federal division(s): Hunter
Suburbs around Martinsville:
Watagans National Park	Watagans National Park	Freemans Waterhole
Olney	Martinsville	Cooranbong
Ravensdale	Lemon Tree	Cooranbong

Martinsville is a small town near Morisset and west of Lake Macquarie in New South Wales, Australia. It is part of the West Ward of the City of Lake Macquarie local government area.

== History ==
It was first settled by Europeans between 1861 and 1866. The first industry in the area was timber. The public school opened in 1878, but this was eventually closed and pupils transferred to Cooranbong Community School. The town sits in a small valley at the base of the Watagan Mountains.
