= Freemans Waterhole =

- Suburb
- Coordinates: 32°58′54″S 151°29′04″E
- Country: Australia
- State: New South Wales
- City: Lake Macquarie
- LGA: City of Lake Macquarie
- Location: 20 km (12 mi) N of Morisset; 33 km (21 mi) WSW of Newcastle; 33 km (21 mi) S of Maitland; 55 km (34 mi) N of The Entrance; 127 km (79 mi) N of Sydney

Government
  - State electorate: Lake Macquarie
  - Federal division: Hunter
- Elevation: 120 m (390 ft)

Population
  - Total: 120 (SAL 2021)
- Parish: Cooranbong
Suburbs around Freemans Waterhole
Quorrobolong	Brunkerville	Wakefield
Watagans National Park	Freemans Waterhole	Awaba
Martinsville	Cooranbong	Awaba

Freemans Waterhole is a small town west of Lake Macquarie in New South Wales, Australia, located along State Route 82 between Cooranbong and Mulbring. It is part of the West Ward of the City of Lake Macquarie local government area. The suburb is mostly bushland; however, it contains several farms and two petrol stations.
