= Mirrabooka =

Mirrabooka may refer to:

- Mirrabooka, New South Wales
- Mirrabooka, Western Australia
- Electoral district of Mirrabooka, a former electorate of the Western Australian Legislative Assembly
