= Balcolyn, New South Wales =

Balcolyn
- Suburb
- Balcolyn in 2026

- Coordinates: 33°05′53″S 151°33′04″E
- Country: Australia
- State: New South Wales
- LGA: City of Lake Macquarie
- Location: 8 km (5.0 mi) ENE of Morisset
- Established: 1881

Government
  - State electorate: Lake Macquarie
  - Federal division: Hunter

Population
  - Total: 1,002 (2021 census)
- Postcode: 2264
- Parish: Morisset
Suburbs around Balcolyn
	Lake Macquarie
Lake Macquarie	Balcolyn	Lake Macquarie
Yarrawonga Park		Silverwater

Balcolyn is a suburb of the City of Lake Macquarie in New South Wales, Australia on a peninsula east of the town of Morisset on the western side of Lake Macquarie.

== History ==
Shingle Splitters Point

The first inhabitants of the area today known as Balcolyn were the Awabakal people. Significant midden sites left by the Awakbakal can be found along the foreshore of Lake Macquarie from Shingle Splitters Point down to the Crusader Union campsite.

The first European settlements in Balcolyn were in 1881.

Casuarina (she-oak) trees were situated among the waterfront. This attracted the timber industry, as timber from such trees were good for roofing. Shingle Splitters Point (named after the workers, who were called "shingle splitters") was used as an anchorage and loading place.

Alfred Sara, one of the early European settlers on Shingle Splitters Point, is believed to have planted the Norfolk pines that sit on the point today at some point in the 1920s.

The first roads connecting Balcolyn to Morisset were constructed between 1927 and 1937, following increased demands from tourists.

In 1946, Leslie Parr donated land he owned in Balcolyn to The Crusader Union of Australia for the purpose of building a Christian education campsite.

In 1963 Balcolyn received its water supply. The area was hit by flooding in 1984.

== CRU Camp ==
The entrance to CRU Lake Mac

The Crusader Union of Australia runs a Christian education campsite at 40 Yarrawonga Park Road, Balcolyn. It is located on the shores of Lake Macquarie. There are facilities for sport and recreational activities including a jetty for sailing, canoeing, paddle boarding, and fishing.

In 2019, CRU began a $25 million refurbishment of the Lake Macquarie campsite, increasing the capacity of the site from 120 to 380 and constructing two new Climbing Towers. In 2024, a 147 metre long zipline was constructed and was opened by MP Dan Repacholi. In 2026 construction began on more cabin blocks to further increase the guest capacity.

As of 2020, the site injected around $620'000 into the local economy every year.
