= Yarrawonga Park =

- Suburb
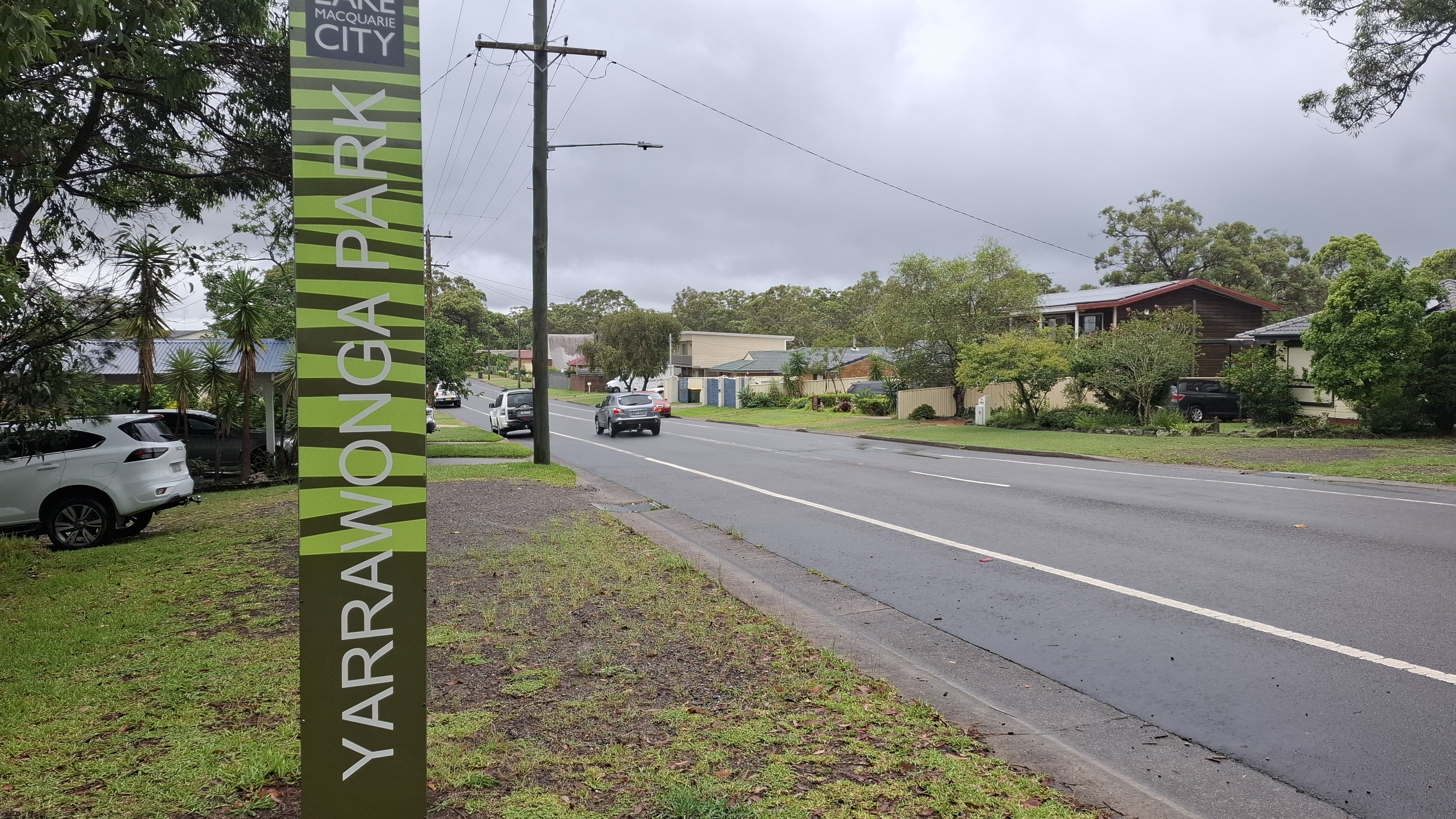

- Coordinates: 33.098°S 151.535°E
- Country: Australia
- State: New South Wales
- LGA: City of Lake Macquarie
- Location: 7 km (4.3 mi) E of Morisset

Government
  - State electorate: Lake Macquarie
  - Federal division: Hunter

Population
  - Total: 390 (SAL 2021)
- Postcode: 2264
- Parish: Morisset
Suburbs around Yarrawonga Park
Lake Macquarie	Balcolyn	Balcolyn
Lake Macquarie	Yarrawonga Park	Silverwater
Bonnells Bay	Brightwaters	Mirrabooka

Yarrawonga Park is a suburb of the City of Lake Macquarie in New South Wales, Australia, and is located on a peninsula east of the town of Morisset on the western side of Lake Macquarie.

== History ==
The name is of Aboriginal origin but its meaning is uncertain.

The Awabakal people are the first people of this area.

Casuarina (she-oak) trees were situated among the waterfront. This attracted the timber industry, as timber from such trees were good for roofing. Shingle Splitters Point (named after the workers, who were called "shingle splitters") in neighbouring Balcolyn was used as an anchorage and loading place.

The population of Yarrawonga Park was 390 at the 2021 census.
