= Silverwater, New South Wales (Lake Macquarie) =

Silverwater New South Wales
- Coordinates: 33°05′53″S 151°34′05″E
- Population: 274 (2021 census)
  - Density: 211/km^{2} (546/sq mi)
- Postcode(s): 2264
- Area: 1.3 km^{2} (0.5 sq mi)
- Location: 9 km (6 mi) E of Morisset
- LGA(s): City of Lake Macquarie
- Parish: Morisset
- State electorate(s): Lake Macquarie
- Federal division(s): Hunter
Suburbs around Silverwater:
Balcolyn	Balcolyn
Yarrawonga Park	Silverwater	Lake Macquarie
Brightwaters	Mirrabooka	Sunshine

Silverwater is a suburb of the City of Lake Macquarie in New South Wales, Australia, and is located on a peninsula east of the town of Morisset on the western side of Lake Macquarie. The Aboriginal people, in this area, the Awabakal, were the first people of this land.
