= Windermere Park =

- Suburb
- Coordinates: 33°6′54″S 151°32′6″E
- Country: Australia
- State: New South Wales
- LGA: City of Lake Macquarie
- Location: 5 km (3.1 mi) E of Morisset

Government
  - State electorate: Lake Macquarie
  - Federal division: Hunter

Population
  - Total: 722 (2021 census)
- Postcode: 2264
- Parish: Morisset
Suburbs around Windermere Park
Bonnells Bay	Bonnells Bay	Brightwaters
Bonnells Bay	Windermere Park	Brightwaters
	Morisset Park

Windermere Park is a suburb of the City of Lake Macquarie in New South Wales, Australia, and is located on a peninsula east of the town of Morisset on the western side of Lake Macquarie.

== History ==
The Awabakal are the traditional people of this area.
