= Awaba railway station =

Railway station in New South Wales, Australia

Awaba
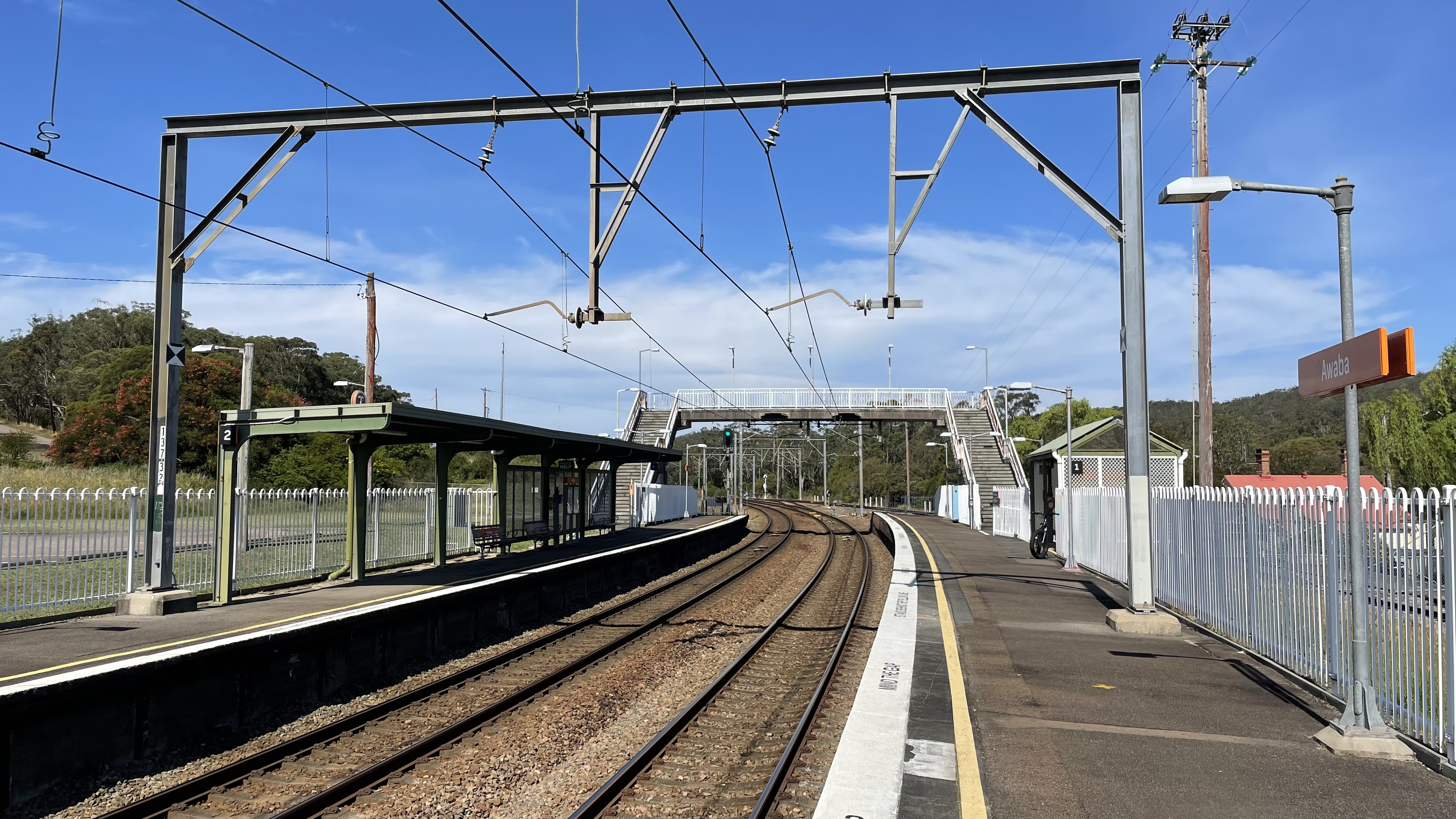
- Northbound view from Platform 1, November 2023

General information
- Location: Adelaide Street, Awaba; Australia
- Coordinates: 33°00′47″S 151°32′30″E
- Elevation: 24 metres (79 ft)
- Owner: Transport Asset Manager of New South Wales
- Operator: Sydney Trains
- Line: Main Northern
- Distance: 137.31 km (85.32 mi) from Central
- Platforms: 2 side
- Tracks: 2
- Connections: Bus

Construction
- Structure type: Ground
- Accessible: No

Other information
- Station code: AWB
- Website: Transport for NSW

History
- Opened: 15 August 1887; 139 years ago

Passengers
- 2025: 11,328 (year); 31 (daily) (Sydney Trains, NSW TrainLink)

Services
Preceding station	Intercity Trains	Following station
Fassifern towards Newcastle Interchange	Central Coast & Newcastle Line	Dora Creek towards Central
Location
- Location within New South Wales

Awaba railway station is located on the Main Northern line in New South Wales, Australia. It serves the City of Lake Macquarie town of Awaba opening on 15 August 1887.

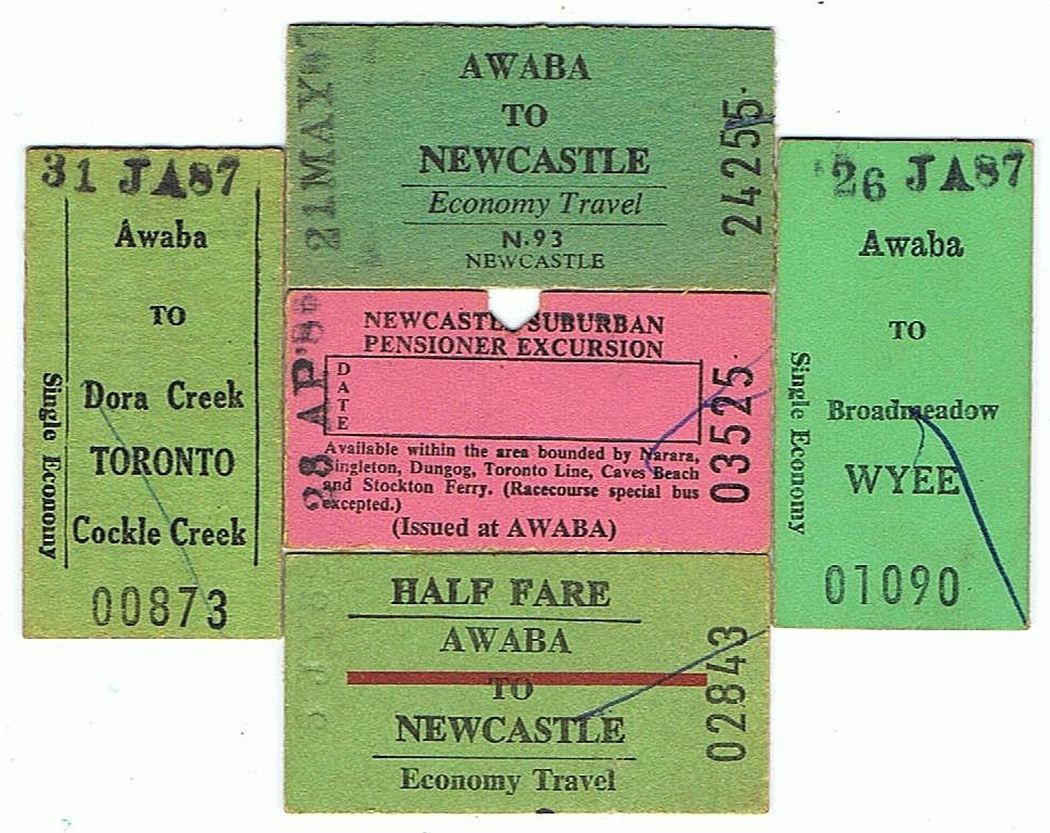
Awaba-issued Edmondson tickets

In April 1993, the original weatherboard station building on the western platform was damaged in a fire and later demolished. It was replaced by the present lighter-weight structure.

Until its formal closure in December 1989, Awaba was the junction for the line to Wangi Power Station, the remnants of which remain behind Platform 1. North of the station are two passing loops, although the northbound one has now been disconnected.

== Platforms and services ==
Awaba has two side platforms. It is serviced by Sydney Trains Intercity Central Coast & Newcastle Line services travelling between Sydney Central, Gosford and Newcastle.

Platform	Line	Stopping pattern	Notes
1	CCN	Services to Gosford & Sydney Central	
2	CCN	Services to Newcastle	

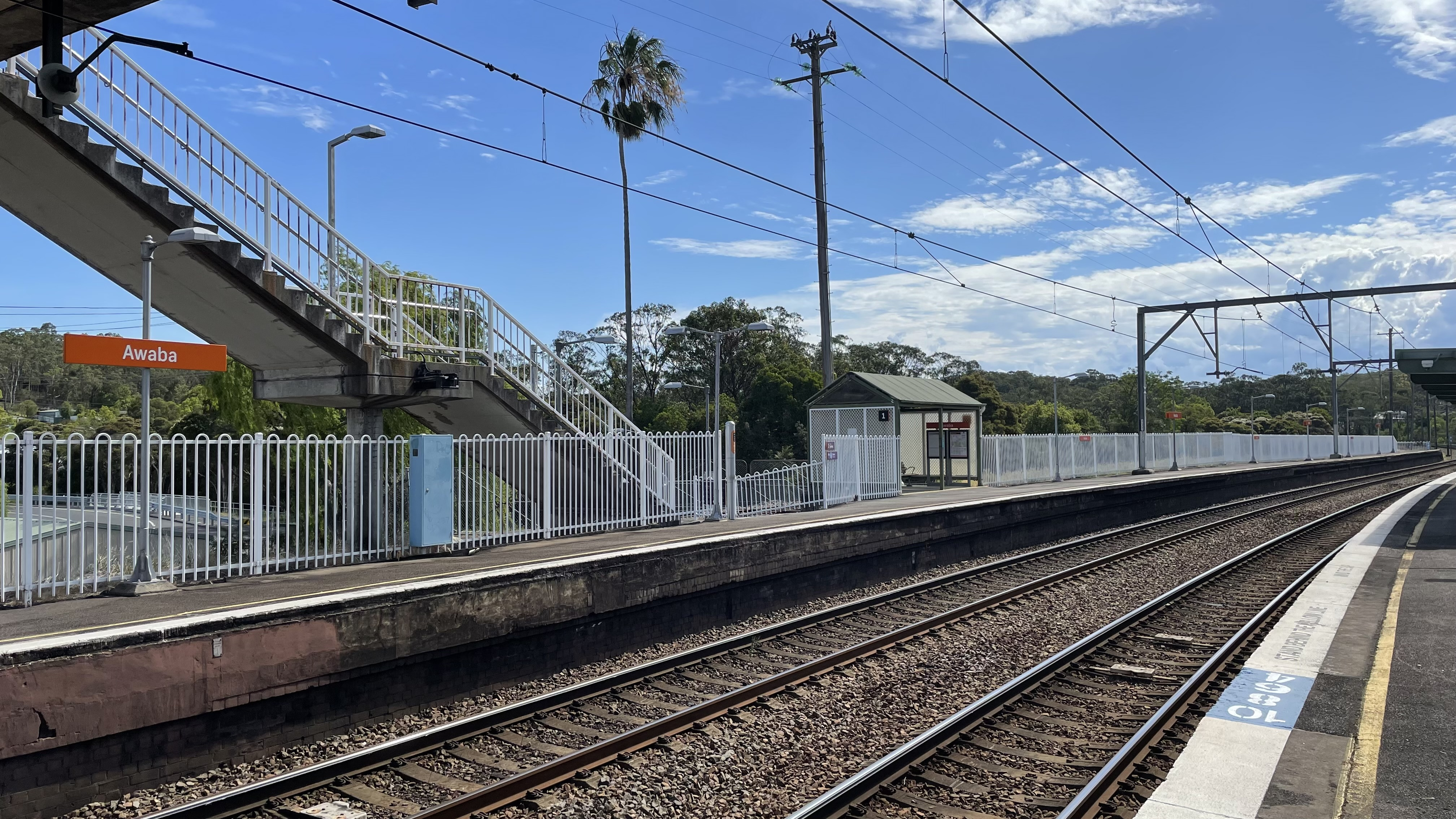
Platform 1

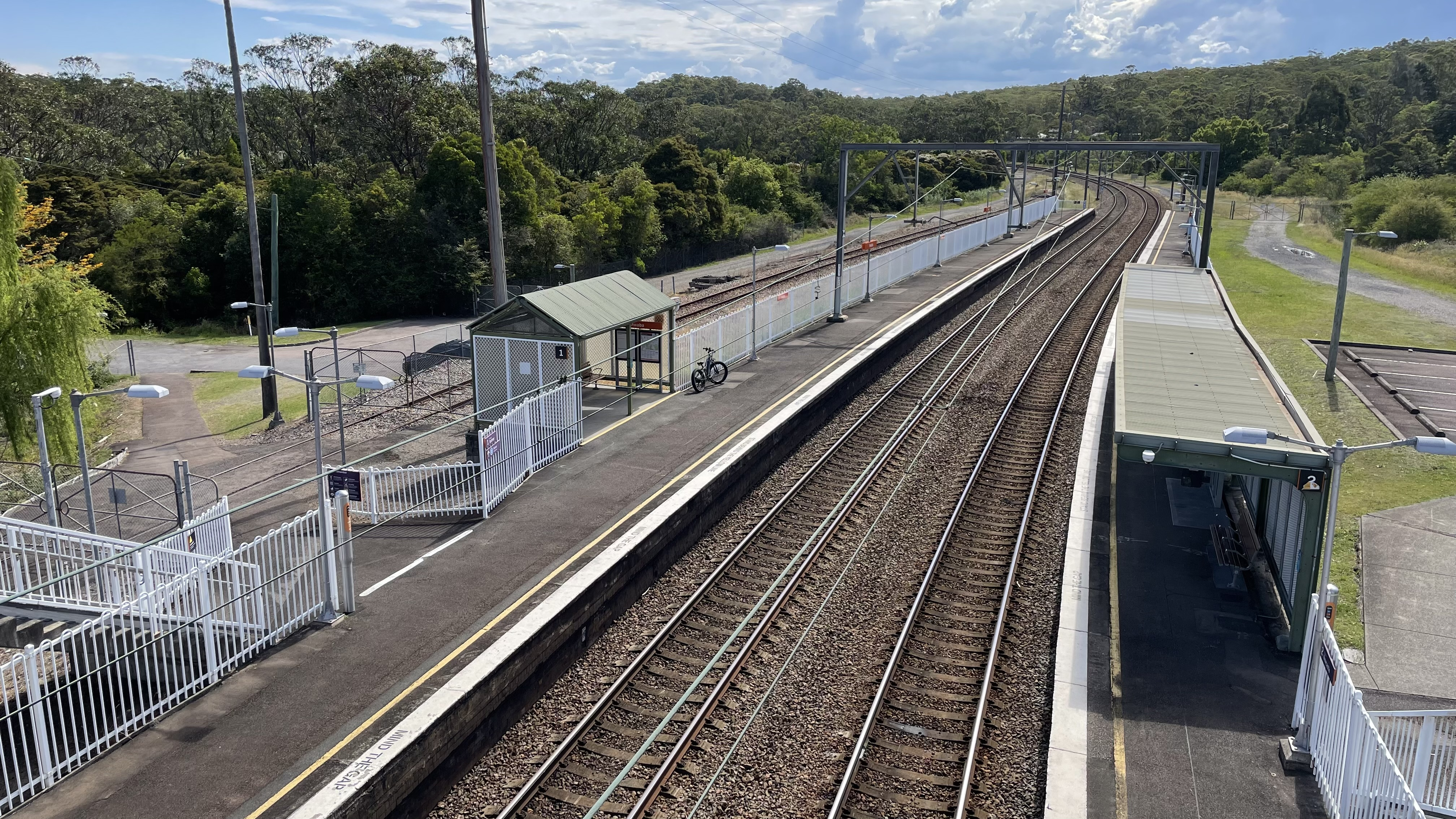
Southbound view from footbridge

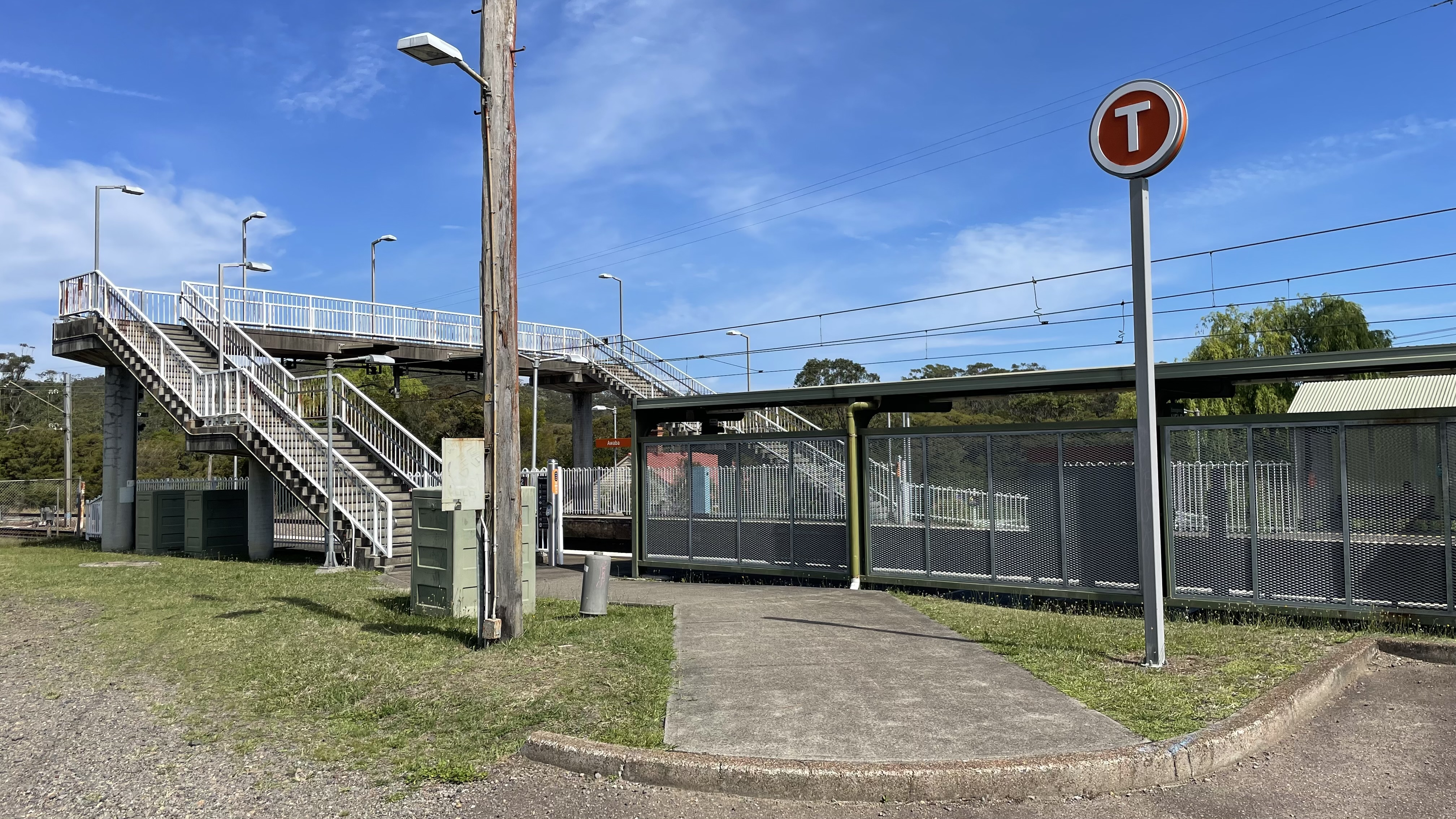
Entrance on Adelaide Street

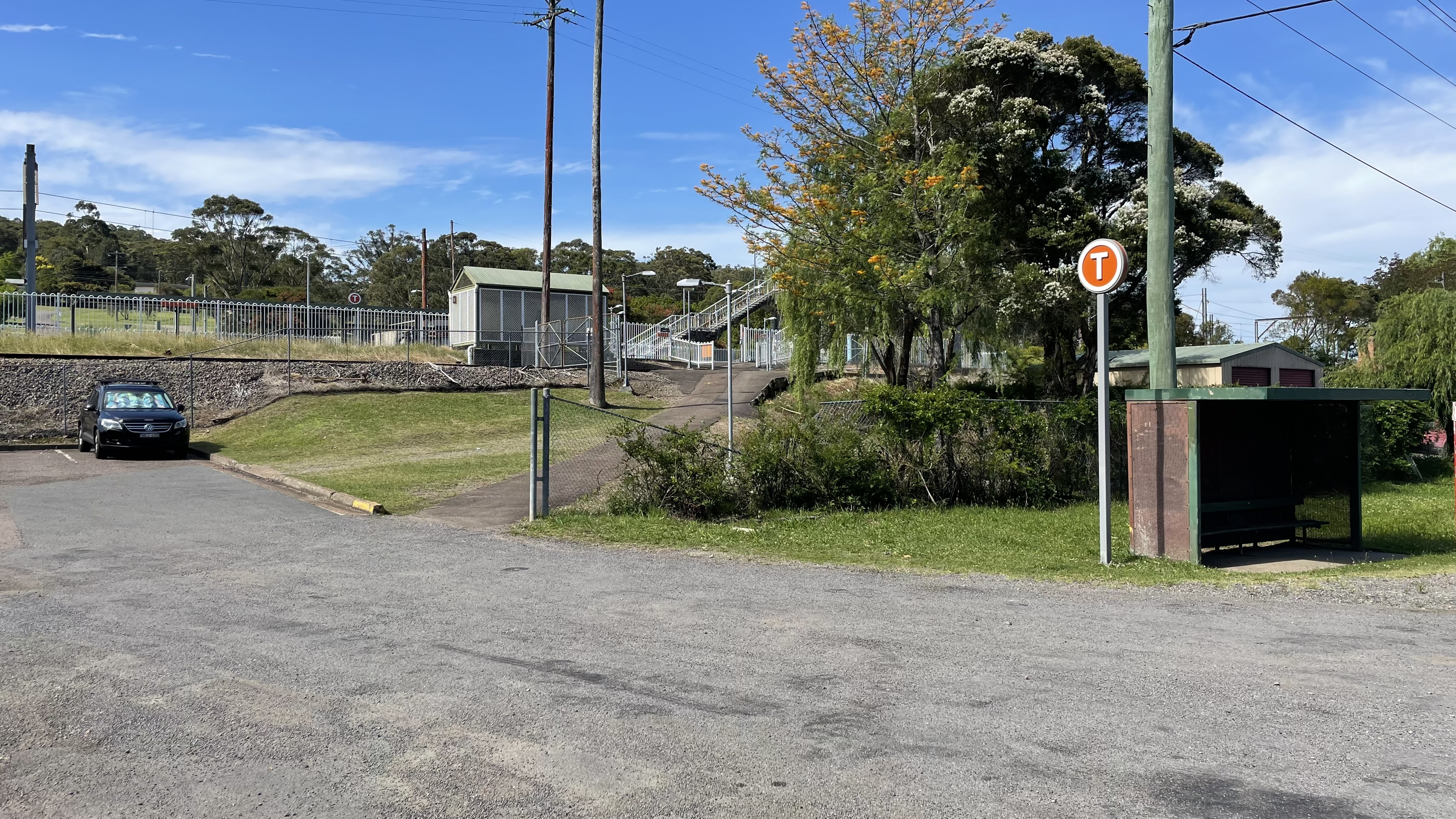
Entrance on Wilton Road

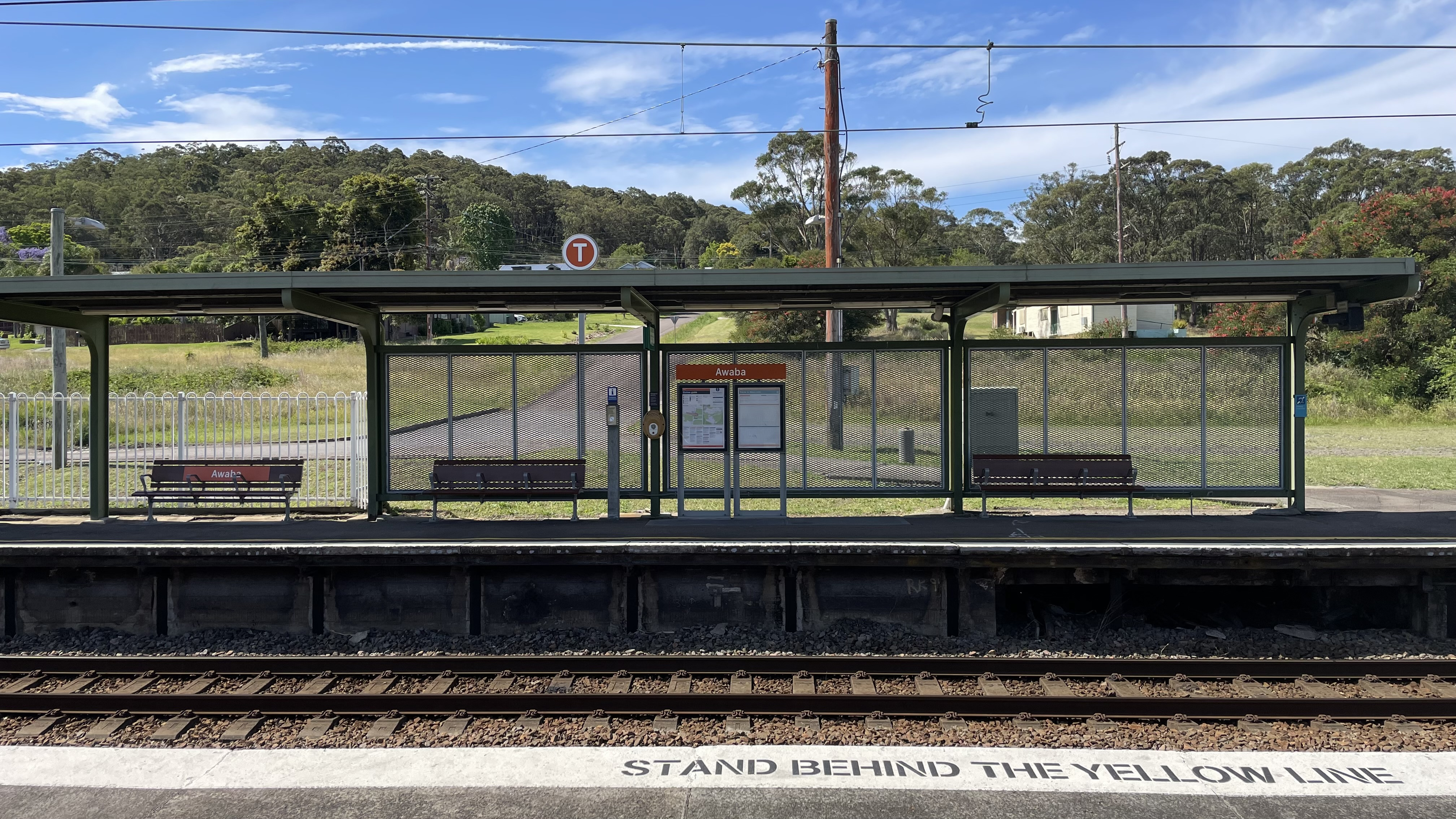
Basic station facilities on platform 2
