= Elsa Klensch =

Australian and American journalist (1930–2022)

- Born: Elsa Aeschbacher; 21 February 1930; Cooranbong, New South Wales, Australia
- Died: 4 March 2022 (aged 92); New York City, U.S.
- Occupations: Journalist, novelist, TV personality

Elsa Klensch (née Aeschbacher; 21 February 1930 – 4 March 2022) was an Australian and American journalist, novelist, and television personality, often working in the world of fashion.

She was the producer and host of Style with Elsa Klensch, CNN's weekly fashion and design television program, which ran from 1980 to 2001.

== Biography ==
Klensch was born on 21 February 1930 in Cooranbong, in the Lake Macquarie District of New South Wales, to Johann Ernst and Mary Margaret (née Miles) Aeschbacher. She was married to Charles Klensch, whom she met in Hong Kong while he was on leave from his post as the Saigon, South Vietnam, news bureau manager for the American Broadcasting Company. They were married in 1966 in wartime Saigon and then settled in New York City.

Klensch worked at the Sydney Telegraph, Australian Broadcasting Corporation, and the Public Information Office of the Territory of Papua and New Guinea. She edited the Hong Kong Trade Bulletin, Women's Wear Daily, and was senior fashion editor at Vogue, Harper's Bazaar, New York Post, and for WCBS-TV. She hosted and produced Style with Elsa Klensch, which ran from 1980 to 2000 on CNN. After leaving CNN she wrote a series of mystery novels about a television news producer who is caught up in a murder investigation.

== Career as a journalist ==
Klensch began her career in 1958 at the Sydney Daily Telegraph while studying journalism at Sydney University.

With the byline Elsa Barker (she adopted Barker as her professional name because Aeschbacher was difficult for people to pronounce, spell, or remember), she also reported for the London Star and the London Sunday Express.

By 1961, she had returned to Sydney and for the home journey accepted the position of press officer for the S/S Canberra's maiden voyage with Pacific ports of call.

Subsequently, she was a regional editor for the Australian Broadcasting's TV Weekly, where she raised circulation and advertising with promotion and livelier editorial content, setting the pattern for a successful national campaign for the magazine which earned her praise for "splendid work and exceptional efforts."

From 1963 to 1964, she was a public relations officer for the Australian administration of Papua and New Guinea, editing a fortnightly newspaper and running a news service. In 1966, she moved to Hong Kong as editor and Publications Section Chief for the Hong Kong Trade Development Council, responsible for a trade-promotion magazine, as well as organizing and promoting fashion shows and international trade fairs. That same year, she retired from her Hong Kong assignments in order to marry Charles Klensch in Saigon and move to New York where, from 1966 to 1972, she reported for Fairchild Publications. Her last assignment there was as a senior market editor at Women's Wear Daily.

In 1973, she moved to Vogue as a senior fashion editor and writer. In March 1976, she became the senior fashion editor at Harper's Bazaar, and then served as fashion editor of The New York Post.

Her first television assignment was in 1979, when she reported for CBS in New York City. During the 1978 New York City newspaper strike, local TV stations brought in newspaper columnists to give reports that would not be appearing in print. She appeared on WCBS, and in a coup, persuaded Yves Saint Laurent (who hated being on TV and usually refused requests) to appear with her as a personal favor.

From April 1980 through January 2000, Elsa was host and producer of CNN's Style With Elsa Klensch.

== Years at CNN: Style With Elsa Klensch ==
In April 1980, Klensch joined Cable News Network (CNN) and appeared on-air from its first week in June 1980 with her groundbreaking Style with Elsa Klensch. For more than twenty years, she produced and hosted the program, which was broadcast globally in 142 countries on both CNN and its 24/7 Headline News channel (Headline News Network). Her half hour, Style with Elsa Klensch was scheduled three times each weekend, and individually produced segments from the program were broadcast up to four times each weekday. Style with Elsa Klensch reached 2.5 million households in the United States each week, becoming CNN's highest-rated weekend feature-news program at its time.

She created Style as a journalistic reflection of her own fashion and design sense. Hers was the first regularly scheduled U.S. television program reporting exclusively on the worlds of fashion, beauty, and design. Its worldwide popularity established her as a TV fashion journalist.

Klensch set the pace for television coverage of fashion. "I always believed that television was a natural outlet for visually exciting design, but in the first days, when I arrived with my crew to cover a show, designers resisted setting aside a place for our camera. All that changed when Style proved how powerful television could be as an international showcase for design."

Based in New York City, Klensch traveled overseas three or four months a year to report from the other fashion capitals of Paris, Milan, Tokyo, and London. She also covered fashion and design from Bali, Beijing, Havana, Madrid, Manila, Moscow, Rio de Janeiro, and Sydney.

The network estimated that over the years her coverage was seen by 200 million viewers worldwide.

She set a goal for herself "I wanted to remain with my program to cover fashion and design into the new millennium."

Although she still had more than two years left on her contract, she decided to leave CNN in 2001, and asked to be released to devote herself to other non-television interests.

== Published works ==
In 1995, (together with Beryl Meyer) she wrote Style, a practical, illustrated advice book focused on helping women to define and develop a personal, individual style. Style was published by the Perigee imprint of the Berkley Publishing Group. It reached audiences worldwide.

After leaving CNN in early 2001, she turned her attention back to writing. She created a monthly jewelry column for the Internet magazine Gem.net, and wrote articles for Elle Decor, House Beautiful, Architectural Digest, and others.

In June 2002, Forge Books, a division of the Holtzbrinck Publishing Group, signed Klensch to write a series of four mystery novels featuring television news producer Sonya Iverson as amateur sleuth.

The first novel, Live at 10:00, Dead at 10:15, was published in hardcover in September 2004, followed by the paperback in 2005. The second, Shooting Script, came out in October 2005. The third, Take Two, was published in December 2007. The fourth, The Third Sin, was published in hard cover in 2014.

== Other notable professional activities ==
While still at CNN, she wrote a weekly nationally syndicated newspaper advice column on personal style for the Los Angeles Times Syndicate and served as contributing editor of The Connoisseur magazine. She also became a regular lecturer on fashion and design for professional organizations as well as costume departments of art museums in Chicago, Houston, Los Angeles, San Diego, and Toledo, Ohio, and at Auburn University and the Savannah College of Art and Design.

In 1994, she made a cameo appearance in Robert Altman's film Ready to Wear (Prêt-à-Porter) and in several episodes of the CBS soap opera The Bold and the Beautiful.

== Honors and awards ==
Her honors included:

- Council of Fashion Designers of America's special award in 1986 and their 1998-99 Eugenia Sheppard Award for journalism.
- Anti-Defamation League's 1995 Woman of Achievement Award.
- Fashion Group International 1966 Superstar Award.
- Order of Merit (Ordine al Merito) from the Italian government in 1988 for "distinguished reporting on Italian design, craftsmanship and style".
- Honorary Doctorate of Fine Arts from the International Fine Arts College in Miami in 1990, which cited her "outstanding contribution to the international fashion and design community and her continuing inspiration for students of fashion and interior design".
- Elected to the International Best Dressed Hall of Fame List in 1990.
- Commencement address at New York's Fashion Institute of Technology (Class of 2001).
- Distinguished Achievement Award of the Laboratory Institute of Merchandising, New York City (2005).
- Election to Fashion Media Hall of Fame at Kent State University.

She served on the Kent State University Fashion Department Advisory Board.

New York's Metropolitan Museum of Art acquired the CNN archive of a thousand weeks of Style with Elsa Klensch for its Costume Institute.

Member and former vice president of the Fashion Group International.

Member of The Authors Guild, the Society of Authors (UK), Mystery Writers of America, and Sisters in Crime.

== Death ==
Klensch died at her home in Manhattan, New York City on 4 March 2022, at the age of 92.
