= Dora Creek railway station =

Railway station in New South Wales, Australia

Dora Creek
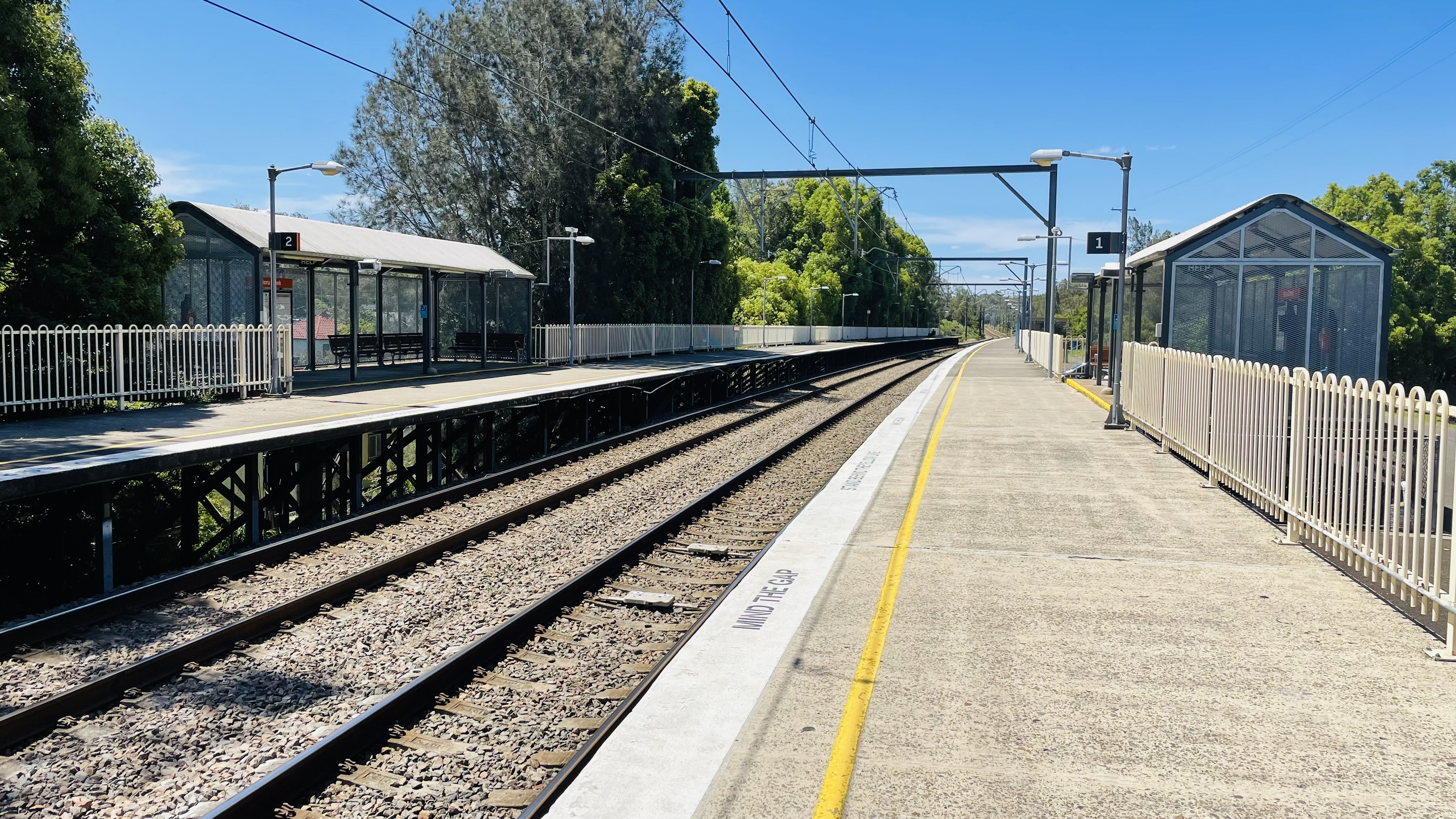
- Northbound view from Platform 1, November 2022

General information
- Location: Warnsley Street, Dora Creek; Australia
- Coordinates: 33°04′59″S 151°30′04″E
- Elevation: 2 metres (6 ft 7 in)
- Owner: Transport Asset Manager of New South Wales
- Operator: Sydney Trains
- Line: Main Northern
- Distance: 127.23 km (79.06 mi) from Central
- Platforms: 2 side
- Tracks: 2
- Connections: Bus

Construction
- Structure type: Ground
- Accessible: No

Other information
- Station code: DRK
- Website: Transport for NSW

History
- Opened: 16 August 1889; 137 years ago

Passengers
- 2025: 21,209 (year); 58 (daily) (Sydney Trains, NSW TrainLink)

Services
Preceding station	Intercity Trains	Following station
Awaba towards Newcastle Interchange	Central Coast & Newcastle Line	Morisset towards Central
Location

Dora Creek railway station is located on the Main Northern line in New South Wales, Australia. It serves the City of Lake Macquarie town of Dora Creek opening on 16 August 1889.

It originally had a substantial weatherboard building on Platform 2. This was demolished in the 1990s and replaced with the current lightweight structures.

== Platforms and services ==
Dora Creek has two side platforms. It is serviced by Sydney Trains Intercity Central Coast & Newcastle Line services travelling between Sydney Central, Gosford and Newcastle.

Platform	Line	Stopping pattern	Notes
1	CCN	Services to Gosford & Sydney Central	
2	CCN	Services to Newcastle	

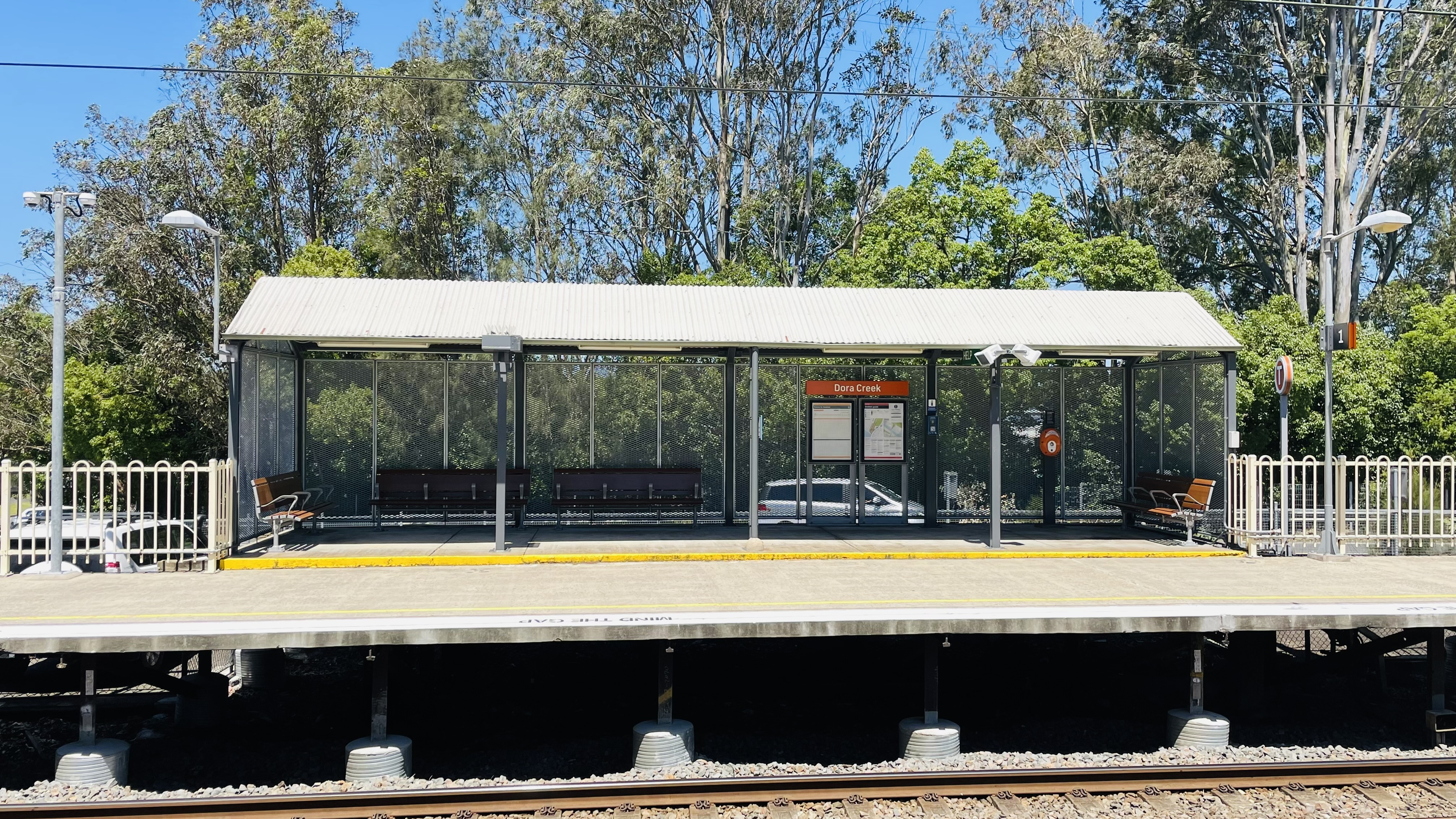
Facilities on Platform 1

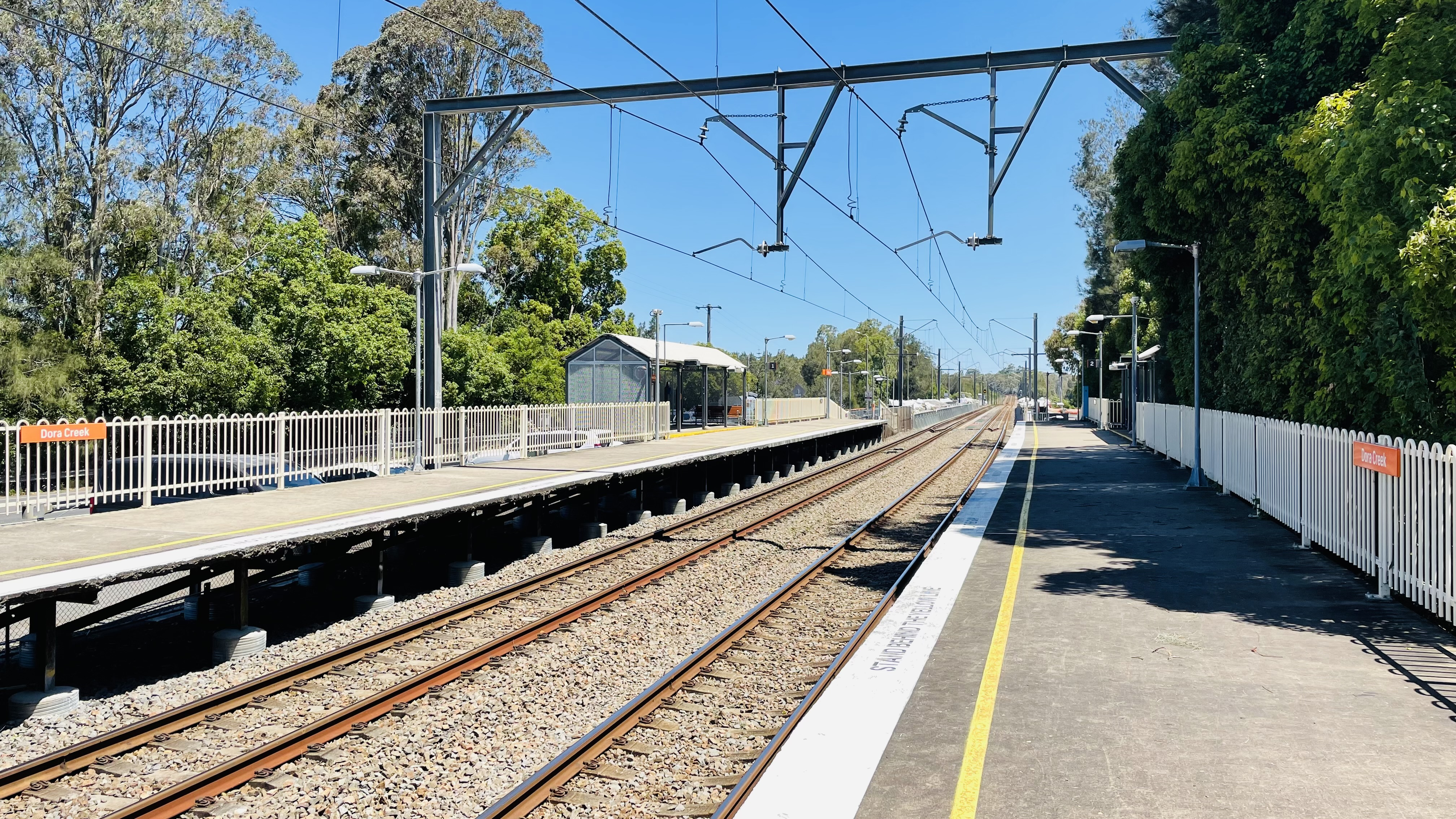
Southbound view from Platform 2
