= Sunshine, New South Wales =

Sunshine New South Wales
- Coordinates: 33°06′54″S 151°34′05″E
- Population: 475 (2021 census)
  - Density: 680/km^{2} (1,760/sq mi)
- Established: 1881
- Postcode(s): 2264
- Area: 0.7 km^{2} (0.3 sq mi)
- Location: 9 km (6 mi) E of Morisset
- LGA(s): City of Lake Macquarie
- Parish: Morisset
- State electorate(s): Lake Macquarie
- Federal division(s): Hunter
Suburbs around Sunshine:
Silverwater	Silverwater
Mirrabooka	Sunshine	Lake Macquarie
	Lake Macquarie

Sunshine is a suburb of the City of Lake Macquarie in New South Wales, Australia on a peninsula east of the town of Morisset on the western side of Lake Macquarie. The Awabakal were the first inhabitants of the area.

Early industries included fishing, timbercutting, subsistence farming and boatbuilding.
