= Brunkerville, New South Wales =

Brunkerville Cessnock, New South Wales
- Coordinates: 32°56′56″S 151°28′44″E
- Population: 216 (2021 census)
- Gazetted: 23 October 2015 (locality)
- Postcode(s): 2323
- Elevation: 63 m (207 ft)
- Time zone: AEST (UTC+10)
  - Summer (DST): AEST (UTC+11)
- Location: 17.4 km (11 mi) SE of Cessnock; 28.4 km (18 mi) W of Newcastle; 105.4 km (65 mi) N of Sydney
- LGA(s): Cesnock
- Region: Hunter
- County: Northumberland
- State electorate(s): Cessnock
- Federal division(s): Hunter
Suburbs around Brunkerville:
Mount Vincent	Mount Vincent	Killingworth
Mount Vincent	Brunkerville	Freemans Waterhole
Olney	Freemans Waterhole	Freemans Waterhole

Brunkerville is a rural locality in the Hunter Region, New South Wales, Australia. Brunkerville is a part of Cessnock City area, and has the East Maitland postcode, 2323. Geographically, Brunkerville consists of rolling country hills and is flanked by the Watagan and Sugarloaf Mountain Ranges.

There is a two part series explaining what life was like in Brunkerville in 1893 with multiple local people, covering the topics, including convicts, noble families and education.
