= Mount Warrawolong =

Mountain in New South Wales, Australia

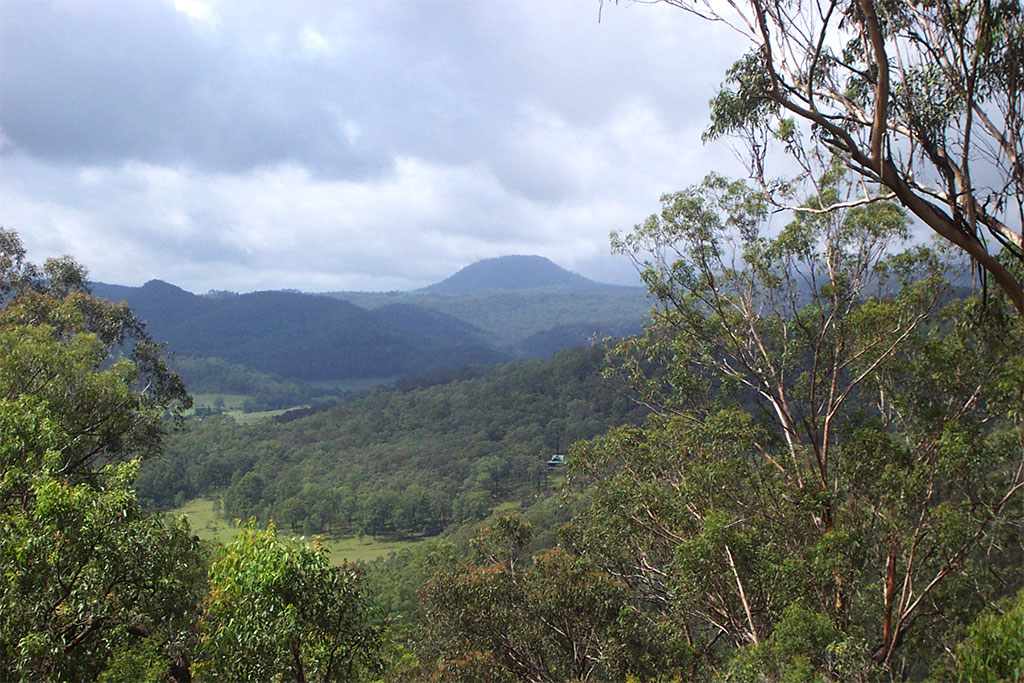
- Mount Warrawolong as viewed from Wattagan Creek Road, Laguna

Highest point
- Elevation: 641 m (2,103 ft); AHD
- Coordinates: 33°02′S 151°15′E

Geography
- Location within New South Wales
- Country: Australia
- State: New South Wales
- Parent range: Watagan Mountains
- Topo map: Morisset

Mount Warrawolong is the highest point of the Watagan Mountains in New South Wales, Australia, rising to 641 metres (2,103 ft) above sea level.
