= Mirrabooka, New South Wales =

Mirrabooka
- Suburb
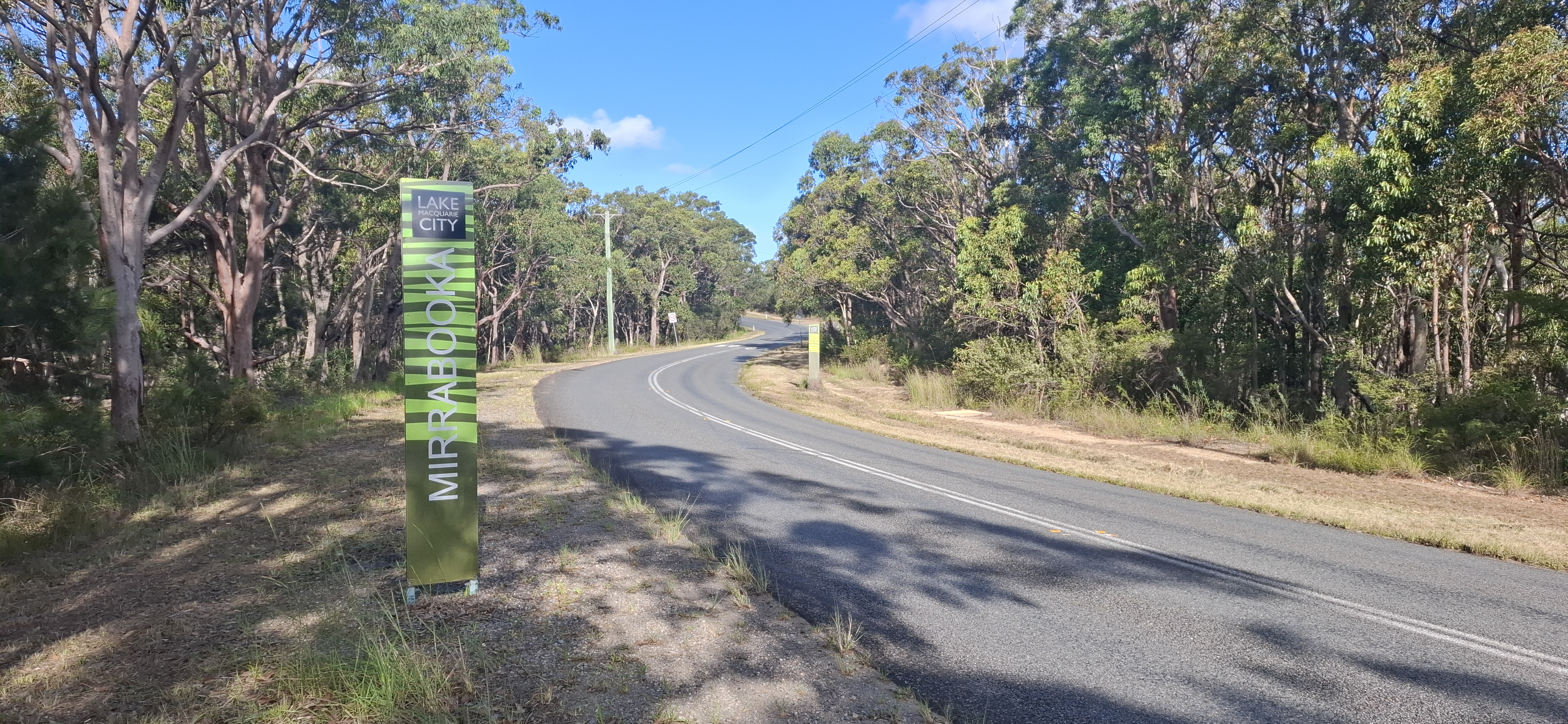

- Coordinates: 33°06′54″S 151°33′04″E
- Country: Australia
- State: New South Wales
- LGA: City of Lake Macquarie
- Location: 8 km (5.0 mi) E of Morisset
- Established: 1927

Government
  - State electorate: Lake Macquarie
  - Federal division: Hunter

Area
  - Total: 0.8 km^{2} (0.31 sq mi)

Population
  - Total: 809 (2021 census)
  - Density: 1,010/km^{2} (2,620/sq mi)
- Postcode: 2264
- Parish: Morisset
Suburbs around Mirrabooka
Yarrawonga Park	Silverwater	Silverwater
Brightwaters	Mirrabooka	Sunshine
	Lake Macquarie

Mirrabooka is a suburb on a peninsula east of the town of Morisset on the western side of Lake Macquarie in New South Wales, Australia. It is part of the West Ward of the City of Lake Macquarie local government area.

== History ==
The town's name is an Aboriginal word for the Southern Cross. The town was formerly known as Mirraview. According to Aboriginal legend, Mirrabooka was once known as ‘‘dog died here’’. Early industries were timber cutting and fishing. A school operated from 1936 to 1972. The town fell into decline after 1970, but has since undergone a resurgence.
