= Brightwaters, New South Wales =

Brightwaters
- Suburb
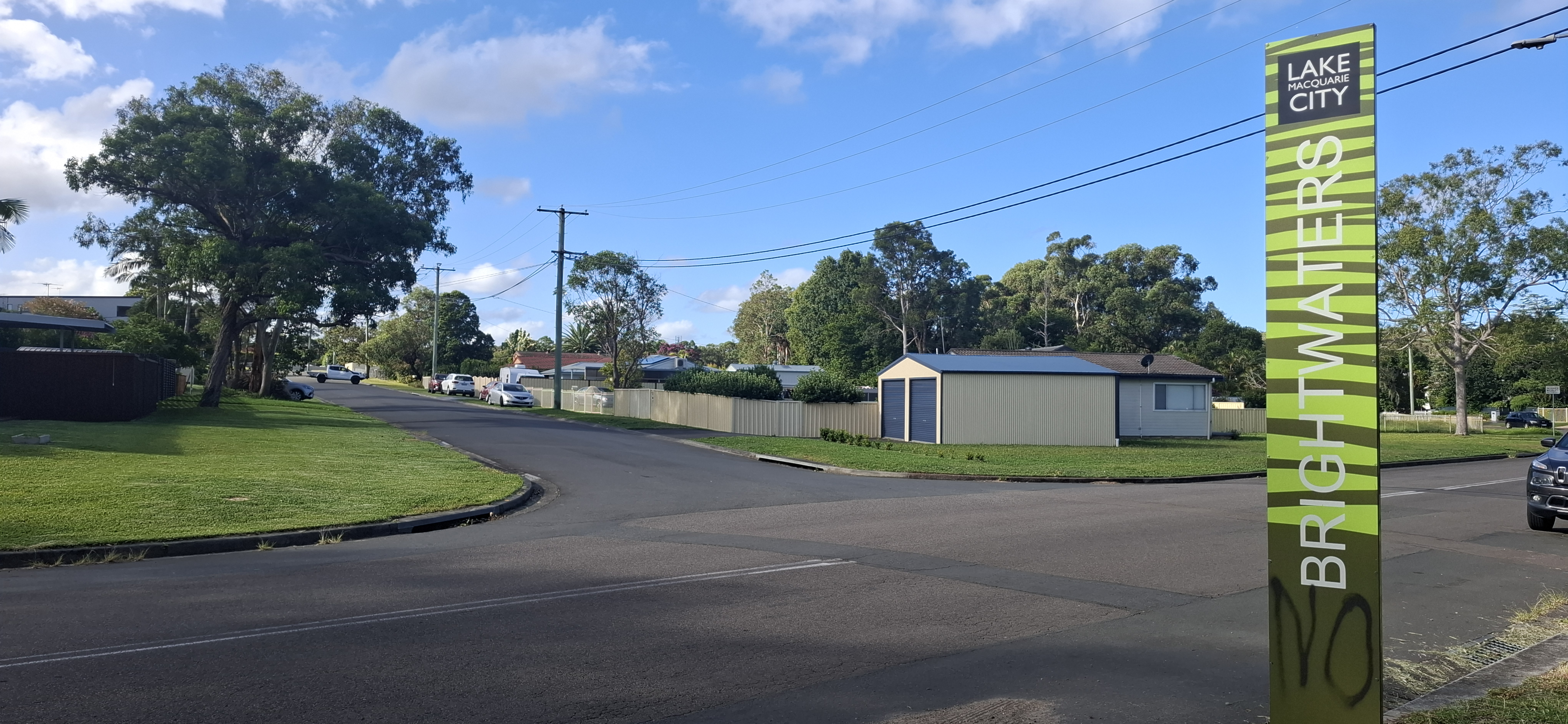

- Coordinates: 33°05′53″S 151°32′06″E
- Country: Australia
- State: New South Wales
- LGA: City of Lake Macquarie
- Location: 6 km (3.7 mi) E of Morisset
- Established: 1859

Government
  - State electorate: Lake Macquarie
  - Federal division: Hunter

Area
  - Total: 1.1 km^{2} (0.42 sq mi)

Population
  - Total: 875 (2021 census)
  - Density: 800/km^{2} (2,060/sq mi)
- Postcode: 2264
- Parish: Morisset
Suburbs around Brightwaters
| Bonnells Bay | Bonnells Bay | Yarrawonga Park |
| Bonnells Bay | Brightwaters | Mirrabooka |
| Windermere Park | Lake Macquarie |

Brightwaters is a suburb of the City of Lake Macquarie in New South Wales, Australia on a peninsula east of the town of Morisset on the western shore of Lake Macquarie.

== History ==
Early industries were tinned fish and sugar cane. A sugar cane mill was built, but it was destroyed by a bushfire in 1875. A post office was opened in 1963 and closed in 1979.

== Population ==
In the 2016 Census, there were 903 people in Brightwaters. 84.1% of people were born in Australia and 93.0% of people spoke only English at home. The most common responses for religion in Brightwaters were No Religion 24.9%, Catholic 24.1% and Anglican 19.8%.
