= Morisset Hospital =

Psychiatric hospital in New South Wales, Australia

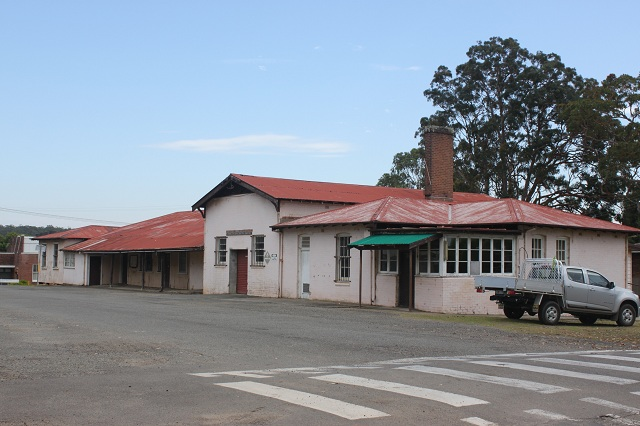

- Location within New South Wales Location within Australia
- 33.1296°S 151.5107°E
- Location: Morisset Park Road, Morisset, Greater Newcastle, New South Wales, Australia

History
- Built: 1906–1959

Site notes
- Architect: NSW Government Architect's Office
- Owner: NSW Department of Health

New South Wales Heritage Register
- Official name: Morisset Hospital Precinct; Ward; Medical Records; Ambulance Training; Psych. Rehab Building
- Type: state heritage (complex / group)
- Designated: 2 April 1999
- Reference no.: 827
- Type: Hospital
- Category: Health Services
- Builders: NSW Department of Public Works

Morisset Hospital is a heritage-listed psychiatric hospital located on Silky Oak Drive (off Morisset Park Road), Morisset, Greater Newcastle, New South Wales, Australia. It was designed by the New South Wales Government Architect's Office and built from 1906 to 1959 by the Department of Public Works. The property is owned by the Department of Health. It was added to the New South Wales State Heritage Register on 2 April 1999.

== History ==
Morisset Hospital is named after soldier James Morisset (1780-1852), the second commandant of the penal colony at Norfolk Island.

On 25 August 1900, the government proclaimed 1300 acres on the shores of Lake Macquarie as reserved for an Asylum for the Insane. Approval for construction of the Morriset Hospital was provided by the Insanity Act in 1901.

Clearing and construction for the hospital commenced in 1906, with a staff of three male attendants and six patients living side by side in tents. The first structure completed was a jetty, and then a dam, and then the first temporary ward. Building material was transported across the lake by barge.

In 1907, the first manager, George Edwards was appointed. He supervised clearing the land and preparing the site. Arthur John Wilson was transferred from Kenmore Mental Hospital in Goulburn to supervise construction of roadways to enable access for building, including “The Avenue”, now the main road leading to the township of Morisset.

Construction of Ward 1 and the Recreation Hall commenced in 1908. The first patients arrived on 9 May 1909, and Ward 1 opened on 6 September. There were 78 male patients at that time. Construction of further buildings was well underway.

By 1910, there were 157 male patients. Temporary calico dormitories were erected. These buildings consisted of a wooden frame, calico side panels, wooden floors and a canvas fly over the whole building. The manager's residence was constructed.

The cricket oval, poultry yards and gardens were completed in 1911. The hospital had 243 male patients in 1912 (mostly housed in the calico wards), rising to 288 in 1913 and 375 in 1914. The first medical officer, Dr Samson, commenced duty in 1912, replacing a Gosford doctor visiting once a week.

The building programme was largely suspended during World War I, although the hospital fishing fleet was assembled and the main store completed in 1916. By 1918, the population had reached 484 male patients, 93 in excess of the accommodation. By 1920, although a new ward had opened, the population had risen to 512 men, and overcrowding was very bad.

In 1930, land was set aside for the establishment of a Hospital for the Criminally Insane, the first prison specifically set up for the criminally insane. It commenced operation in 1933, by which time 672 men were at Morriset.

The first female patients and nursing staff arrived in March 1934. New Male Refractory wards were opened in March 1938. World War II resulted in another halt to construction work due to a lack of funds. A serious drought in 1939 resulted in an acute water shortage at Morriset, requiring the construction of an emergency service from Pourmalong Creek. The chapel was opened and dedicated in August 1957, and the dairy opened in July 1962. By 1963, there was a patient population of 1490.

In 1965, the integration of male and female wards commenced. The number of admissions decreased and there was a rise in the discharge rate, resulting in a decrease in pressure on hospital beds. Large wards began to reduce the number of beds.

By 1970, patient numbers were declining due to more patients being eligible for disability pensions, more effective medications, treatment programs, and a change in community attitudes. Early 1970s, the "boys" from Peat & Milson Islands started being transferred to Morisset. Patient work gangs ceased operation in 1974.

In 1985, the hospital was divided into two distinct and separate entities – Psychiatric Services and Development Disability. Wards 16, 18, 19 and 20 closed. In 1991, Ward 21 (“The Crim”) was closed, and Wards 19 and 20 were demolished. In 1992, Ward 9 closed, Ward 11 patients moved into the old doctors and paramedical staff cottages, and a new state of the art forensic psychiatry security unit was built on the site of the demolished wards 19 and 20.

The new Morriset Multipurpose Centre opened in November 2004.

== Description ==
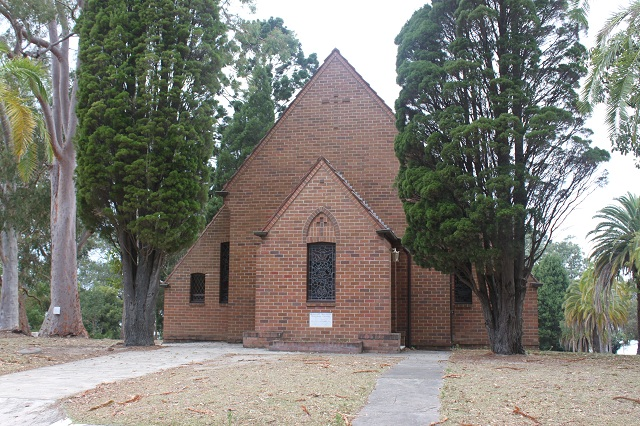
Chapel

The overall Morriset Hospital site comprises almost 100 historic buildings on a 1,244-hectare (4.80 sq mi) site. It is approximately 3 km south-east of the township of Morisset south of Duck Hole Creek and facing east.

The developed hospital grounds are in two quite distinct sections, being: the large area of the general Hospital for the Insane, beautifully land-scaped & sloping down to the waters of the lake on the east; and the much smaller area of the Hospital for the Criminally Insane, isolated in a cleared patch of bushland, and walled like a medieval city.

The Hospital farms are located north of Duck Hole Creek. The site extends as far west as the railway line, east to Charles Avenue, Kendall Grange, north to Fishery Point Road and approximately half a kilometer south of the Forensic Psychiatry Wards (which are south-west of the main hospital campus, inside a 6m high walled enclosure on the western side of Lake Macquarie, which forms a natural (eastern) boundary.

The eastern side of the grounds is bounded by the Lake Macquarie State Recreation Area, managed by the National Parks and Wildlife Service. The eastern side adjoins the Koompahtoo Local Aboriginal Land Council.

The Hospital Precinct comprises:

- MS-12 Wards 5 & 6
- MS-13 Ward 9, Clinical Department
- MS-14 Ward 10
- MS-15 The Chapel
- MS-16 Recreation Hall, 1909
- MS-17 The Main Store
- MS-19 Residence no.1
- MS-20 Ward 17, General Psychiatry
- MS-23 Ward 12
- MS-24 Residence no.3
- MS-26 Cottage Row Residence no.s 16, 17, 18, 19, 20 and 21

The site is close to the suburban areas of the Morisset peninsula, with a densely vegetated zone surrounding the hospital of either natural or regenerated bushland. Remnant native vegetation communities are still present. On the lake fringe, Casuarina sp. dominate the littoral (shore) zone. Forest red gum (Eucalyptus tereticornis) and rough-barked apple gum (Angophora floribunda) plant communities are found with existing trees likely to pre-date the site's 1909 development. Scribbly gum and bloodwood (E.haemostoma) forest dominate the sandstone-based soil zones on higher ground. The site has been extensively planted over many years with a diversity of species still present. Remnants of previous gardens that would have been shaped and planted with site development occur.

There are approximately 80 different species of trees and palms on the site, including remnant (native) species. The oldest planted trees and palms present are about the Recreation Hall and Chapel grounds, the zone between Jacaranda Avenue and Grevillea Road, along Palm Way and on the north eastern side of Waratah Way.

Some remnant trees on the northern side of the Recreation Hall and southern end of Eucalyptus Drive are likely to predate development of the site, based on trunk diameters.

The site has a diverse population of mature trees, in areas about buildings occupied by clients, used by staff, open space areas frequently used by visitors to the grounds and along roadways and pedestrian zones. A total of 745 trees have been assessed.

A cemetery formerly associated with the Hospital is off Nentoura Road, Morisset on an isolated bushland site. Its Anglican section has a lych gate and the oldest headstone is dated 1911. The cemetery has been managed by Lake Macquarie City Council since c. 1974. Older sections of the cemetery are set aside in General, Catholic, Anglican, and Uniting (Presbyterian/Methodist) rows. There are many unmarked graves of patients from the Morisset Hospital buried throughout the eastern side of the cemetery. This cemetery has a Memorial Wall, made of grey granite with a large black granite memorial plaque with a dedication to the former Morisset Hospital patients who are buried in unmarked graves in the cemetery. It also has spaces available for filling on either side for families wishing to memorialise their relatives individually.

== Heritage listing ==
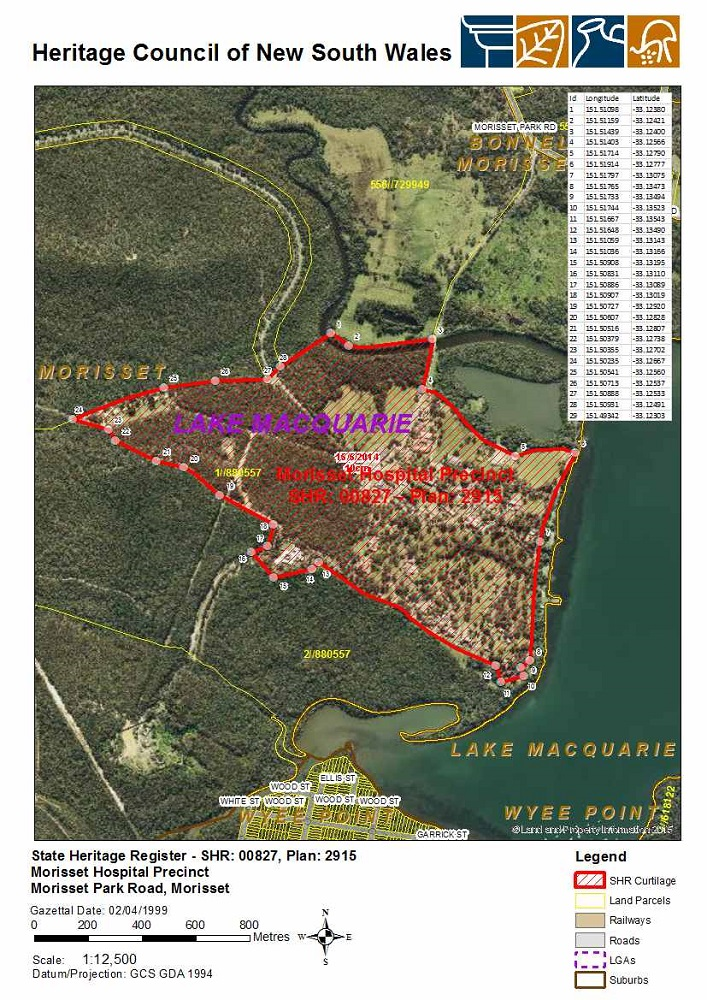
Heritage boundaries

Morisset Hospital Precinct was listed on the New South Wales State Heritage Register on 2 April 1999.
