= Style with Elsa Klensch =

Style with Elsa Klensch is a program that was produced from 1980 to 2001 on CNN. The program dealt with fashion and design from around the world and was hosted by Australian-born Elsa Klensch. Author, writer and astrologer Georgia Routsis Savas worked for the show before becoming the New York newsroom's unit manager. Andrew Bellamy was a producer on the series for 14 years.

The first episode of the program featured interviews by Klensch with Halston, Martha Graham, Andy Warhol and Liza Minnelli.
