= Ravensdale, New South Wales =

Ravensdale
- Suburb
- Interactive map of Ravensdale
- Coordinates: 33°9′54″S 151°18′4″E
- Country: Australia
- State: New South Wales
- City: Central Coast
- LGA: Central Coast Council
- Location: 24 km (15 mi) NW of Wyong

Government
  - State electorate: Wyong
  - Federal division: Dobell

Population
  - Total: 64 (2016 census)
- Postcode: 2259
- Parish: Stowe

Ravensdale is a suburb of the Central Coast region of New South Wales, Australia. It is part of the Central Coast Council local government area. In the 2016 Census, there were 64 people in Ravensdale.
