= Dooralong =

- Suburb
- Interactive map of Dooralong
- Coordinates: 33°10′55″S 151°21′4″E
- Country: Australia
- State: New South Wales
- City: Central Coast
- LGA: Central Coast Council
- Location: 17 km (11 mi) NNW of Wyong

Government
  - State electorate: Wyong
  - Federal division: Dobell

Population
  - Total: 362 (2016 census)
- Postcode: 2259
- Parish: Wyong

Dooralong is a suburb of the Central Coast region of New South Wales, Australia. It is part of the Central Coast Council local government area. Dooralong had a population of 362 at the 2016 census.
