= Watagan Mountains =

Mountain range in Australia

- Watagans or Wattagan Mountains
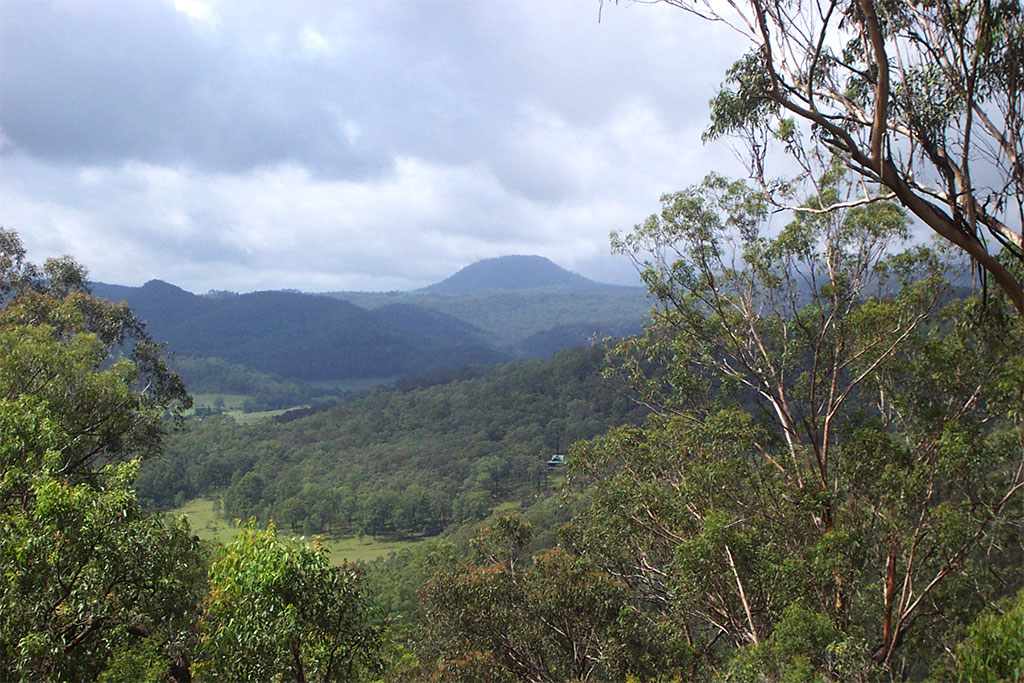
- Mount Warrawolong as viewed from Wattagan Creek Road, Laguna

Highest point
- Peak: Mount Warrawolong, Upper Hunter region
- Elevation: 641 m (2,103 ft); AHD
- Coordinates: 33°02′S 151°15′E

Geography
- Location within New South Wales
- Location: Hunter; Central Coast
- Country: Australia
- State: New South Wales
- Range coordinates: 31°42′S 151°42′E
- Topo map: Morisset

The Watagan Mountains, Watagans, or Wattagan Mountains is a mountain range that is part of the Great Dividing Range in the hinterlands of the Hunter and Central Coast regions of New South Wales, Australia. The range is situated between the Upper Hunter River catchment and the Tuggerah Lakes with close proximity to Lake Macquarie. The Watagans are a popular tourist location and are close to regional centres like Newcastle and Gosford.

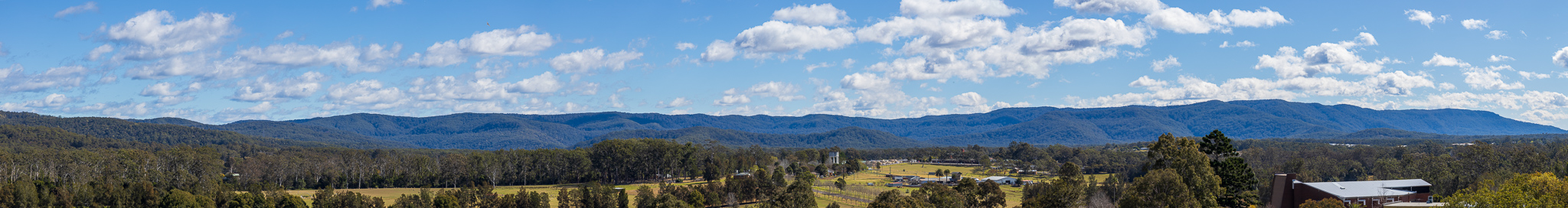
The Watagan Mountains as seen from Cooranbong.

The highest point is Mount Warrawolong which rises to 641 metres (2,103 ft) above sea level.

The Watagans are covered with tall eucalyptus forest and rainforest. There are several camping areas and four wheel drive roads. Some areas can be quite steep and remote, with risky areas of near wilderness.

== See also ==
- List of mountains of Australia § New South Wales
