= Watagans National Park =

National park in Australia

- IUCN category II (national park)
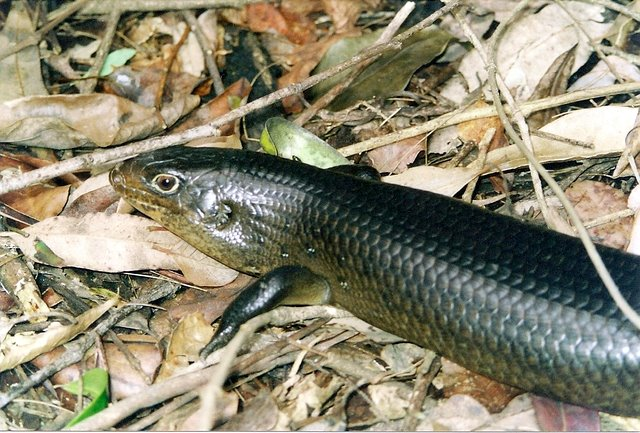
- Land Mullet at Watagans National Park

- Location within New South Wales
- Location: New South Wales
- Coordinates: 33°00′18″S 151°23′35″E
- Area: 77.51 km^{2} (29.93 sq mi)
- Established: 1999
- Governing body: National Parks and Wildlife Service (New South Wales)
- Website: Official website

Watagans is a national park located in New South Wales, Australia, 99 kilometres (62 mi) north of Sydney.

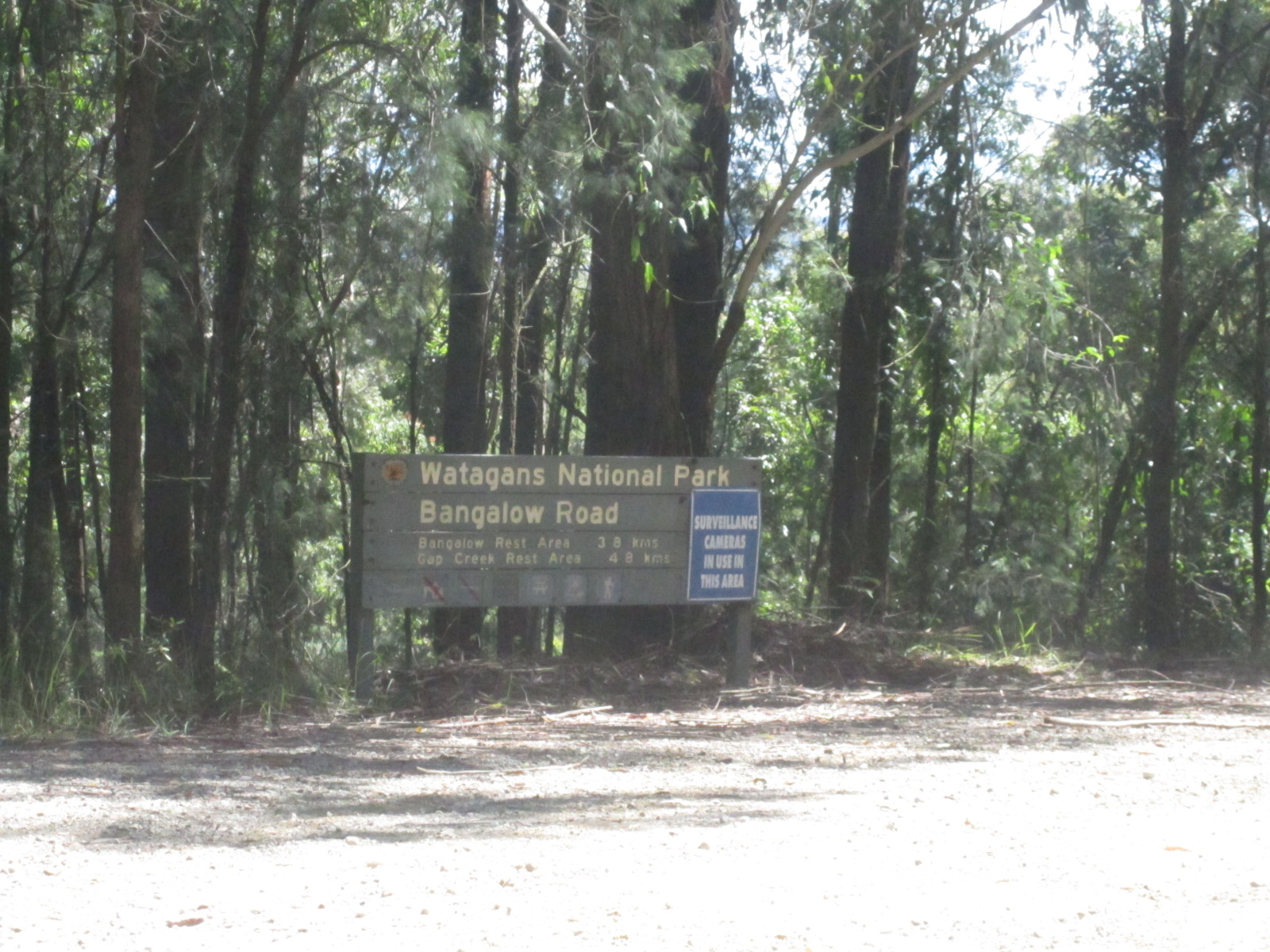

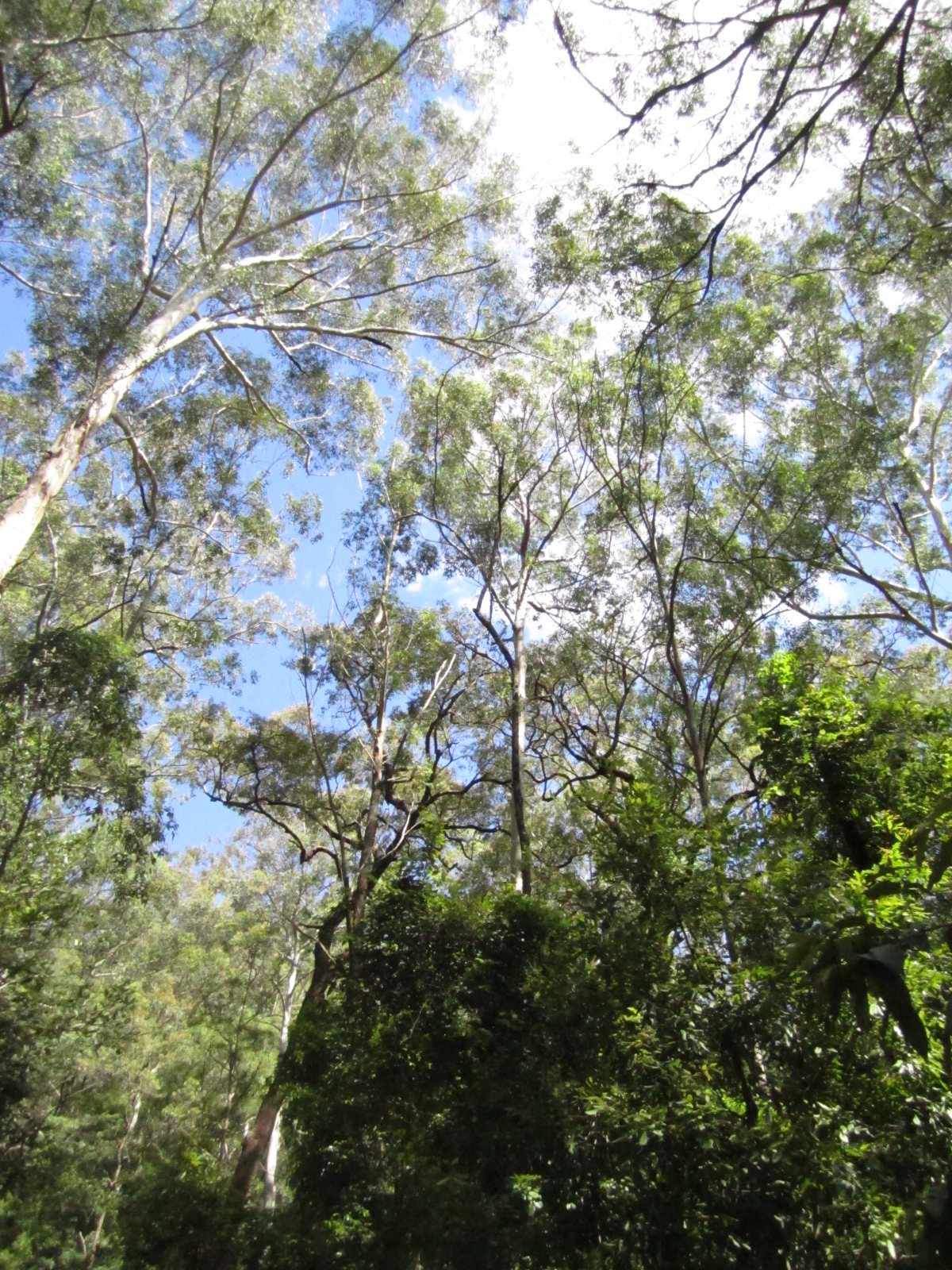

== See also ==
- Protected areas of New South Wales
