= Morisset, New South Wales =

Suburb of New South Wales, Australia

Morisset
- Suburb
- Coordinates: 33°6′54″S 151°30′4″E
- Country: Australia
- State: New South Wales
- Region: Hunter
- City: Greater Newcastle
- LGA: City of Lake Macquarie
- Location: 27 km (17 mi) NNE of Wyong; 111 km (69 mi) NNE of Sydney; 45 km (28 mi) SW of Newcastle; 35 km (22 mi) N of The Entrance; 45 km (28 mi) N of Gosford
- Established: 1887

Government
  - State electorate: Lake Macquarie
  - Federal division: Hunter

Area
  - Total: 27.1 km^{2} (10.5 sq mi)
- Elevation: 35 m (115 ft)

Population
  - Totals: 4,078 (2021 census); 27,828 (2021 census)
  - Density: 150.48/km^{2} (389.7/sq mi)
- Postcode: 2264
- Parish: Morisset
Suburbs around Morisset
Cooranbong	Dora Creek	Lake Macquarie
Mandalong	Morisset	Bonnells Bay
Wyee	Wyee Point	Lake Macquarie

Morisset (/mɔːrɪˈsɛt/ mo-ree-Set;) is a commercial centre and suburb of the City of Lake Macquarie local government area in the Hunter region in New South Wales, Australia. Morisset is a part of the Greater Newcastle area, it is located west of the lake of Lake Macquarie just off the M1 Pacific Motorway. It is also located approximately halfway between Gosford and the Newcastle CBD. The count at the 2021 census was 4,078 for the gazetted suburb of Morisset. The estimated urban population of the Morisset area, including Cooranbong, was 27,828 as at the 2021 census.

== History ==
The town is named for Major James Thomas Morisset, who camped there in 1823 while making the first overland journey from Newcastle to Sydney. Morisset went on to become Commandant at Norfolk Island prison between 1829 and 1833. Some sources state that the town was named after Edric Norfolk Vaux Morisset, the son of James Morisset. However, a letter from Victor Sellheim, grandson of James Morisset, published in 1914, rejects this theory.

Historically there has been considerable confusion over the spelling of the suburb: Morissett, Morriset, Morrissett and Morrisset have been used.

The earliest settlement in the area was at Cooranbong in 1826, about 5 kilometres (3.1 mi) west of the current town and near the foot of the Watagan Mountains. Initially, various kinds of agriculture were conducted, and before long forestry became an important industry. Most of the transport to the area at the time was by river boat on Dora Creek meaning that Cooranbong was the most accessible part of town. The town of Morisset itself was essentially non-existent until 1887, when the Sydney-Newcastle railway was built. Morisset sprang up as a sawmill town clustered around the train station, and the township was proclaimed on 3 December.

In 1908, a psychiatric hospital opened on a large estate along the lake shore. At its height in the 1960s, Morisset Mental Hospital had 1,600 patients. The Hospital continues to dominate Morisset's reputation, although it is now only a 130-bed hospital.

The first bus service was started by the Ward family.

In more recent times, the Morisset Peninsula to the east of the town has become the main residential area. It has experienced a high rate of growth since the construction of Eraring Power Station in 1986. Several retirement villages have been built. Subdivision of larger blocks has come close to saturation in many suburbs, with only a few hobby-farms still remaining, although the majority of the Morisset district and peninsula remain bushland and National Park and Aboriginal reserves.

=== Bernie Goodwin Memorial Park ===
Immediately to the west of Morisset High School is a memorial park dedicated in 1974 to the honour of the late John Bernard (Bernie) Goodwin BM (born 28 March 1923). Goodwin was a local bus driver who on the 15th of March 1973 drove schoolboys from the local high school on a school excursion to Moonee Beach. Four boys who entered the water were caught in an rip current and were separated from the rest of the school group.

Despite the rough currents, Goodwin entered the water and retrieved three of the four boys; upon rescuing the fourth boy more than 100 meters out to sea, Goodwin suffered a presumed heart attack and disappeared beneath the surface when local surfboard riders came to their aid. Despite an extensive search, Goodwin's body was never recovered.

In 2016, Goodwin's family were presented with the Premier of New South Wales's award for Goodwin's heroism. In 2018, Goodwin was posthumously honoured with the Australian Bravery Medal, the third highest civilian bravery honour in the Australian honours system.

== Heritage listings ==
Morisset has a number of heritage-listed sites, including:

- Morisset Park Road: Morisset Hospital

== Education ==
Morisset contains a state primary school, a state high school and a Catholic school. Morisset Public School opened in 1891 and started accommodating high school classes in 1951. These classes transferred to a new high school campus, Morisset High School, at the start of the 1965 school year, with the public school returning to purely primary education.

A Catholic primary school, St John Vianney School, opened on 17 January 1962, and was initially administered by the Sisters of St Joseph until becoming part of the Roman Catholic Diocese of Maitland-Newcastle in 1966.

== Transport ==
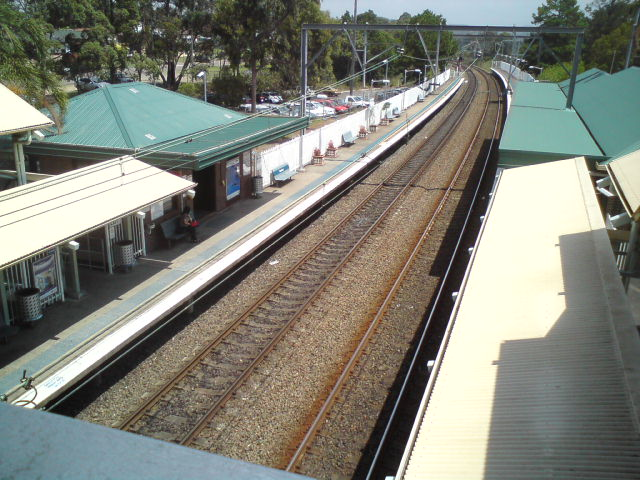
Morisset train station

Morisset railway station, located on Dora Street, is linked to Sydney and Newcastle by Sydney Trains services on the Central Coast & Newcastle Line, and to Maitland and towns further north by long-distance services.

The train station serves as a terminus for bus services 278 and 279 covering the Morisset Peninsula towns and 280 to Cooranbong. These services are operated by Hunter Valley Buses, which acquired the previous provider Toronto Bus. In July 2009, Rover Coaches commenced a new weekday service, Route 163, to Cessnock and Kurri Kurri.

Morisset is also located on an intersection of the M1 motorway, being approximately 55 minutes travel time from the southern end of the motorway at Wahroonga, and 25 minutes south of the Hunter Expressway intersection.

== Tourism ==
Morisset is located along the eastern waterways of Lake Macquarie within proximity to the Watagans National Park at the foot of the Watagan Mountains. The town centre has a range of commercial sites with shops, cafes and restaurants. Morisset is the gateway to the secluded network of trails and paths that connect the Lake Macquarie region.

Dillwynia Bushland Reserve is located directly to the south of Morisset railway station. The land is managed by members of the Biraban Local Aboriginal Land Council.

== Media ==
Christian radio may be heard on 87.8 FM around the town broadcasting 3ABN Australia Radio Network. 3ABN Australia Production Centre is also located in Morisset.
