= Greta railway station =

Railway station in New South Wales, Australia

Greta
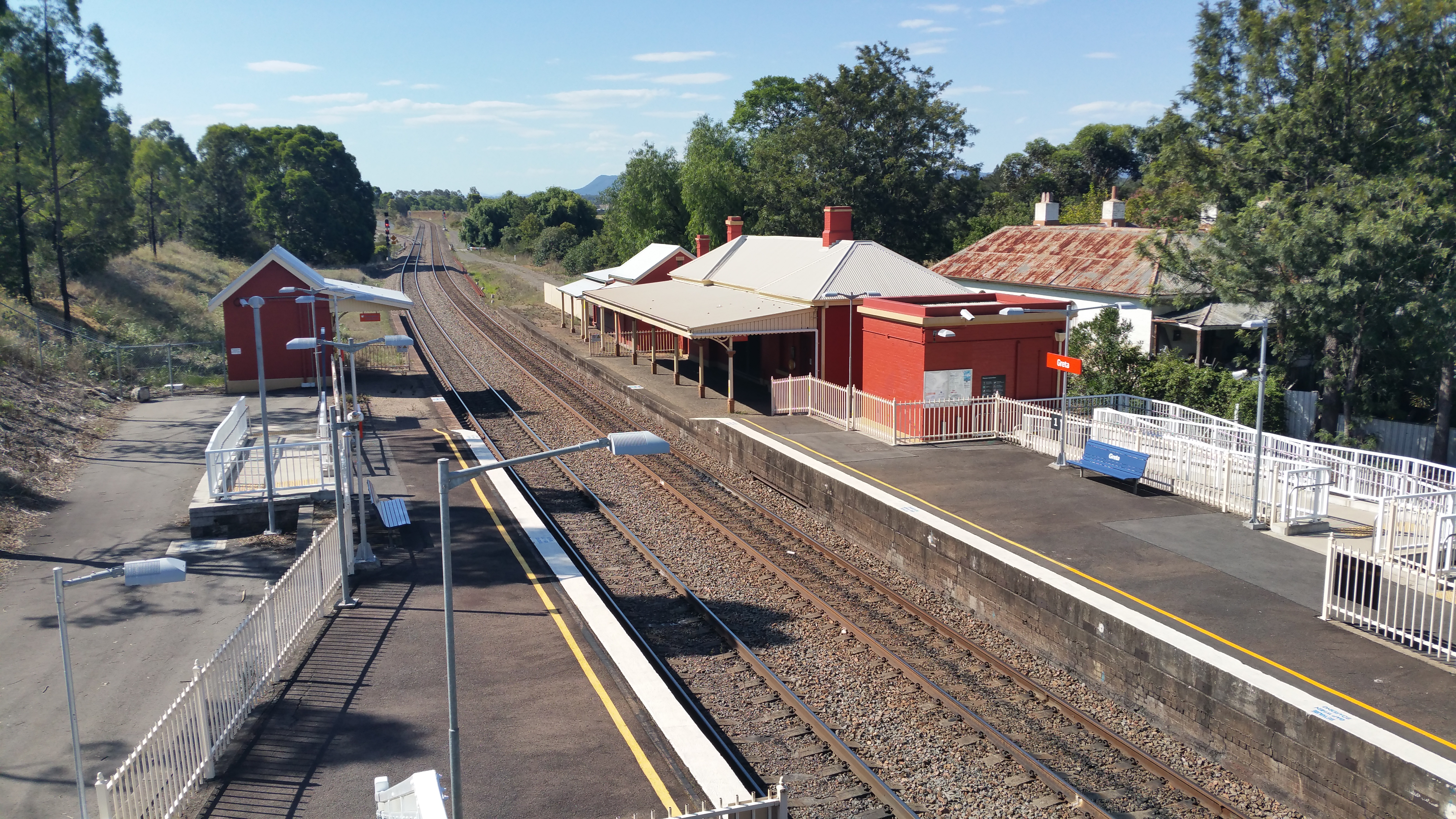
- Station view from footbridge in 2017

General information
- Location: Nelson Street, Greta; Australia
- Coordinates: 32°41′12″S 151°23′03″E
- Owner: Transport Asset Manager of New South Wales
- Operator: Sydney Trains
- Line: Main Northern
- Distance: 210.81 kilometres (130.99 mi) from Central
- Platforms: 2 side
- Tracks: 2

Construction
- Structure type: Ground

Other information
- Station code: GTA
- Website: Transport for NSW

History
- Opened: 24 March 1862
- Former names: Farthing (1862–1878)

Passengers
- 2023: >570 (year) (Sydney Trains, NSW TrainLink)

Services
Preceding station	Intercity Trains	Following station
Branxton towards Scone	Hunter Line	Lochinvar towards Newcastle Interchange
Former services
Preceding station	Former services	Following station
Branxton towards Wallangarra	Main Northern Line (1869–2005)	Allandale towards Sydney
Location

Greta railway station is a heritage-listed railway station located on the Main Northern line in New South Wales, Australia. It serves the town of Greta, opening on 24 March 1862. It was added to the New South Wales State Heritage Register on 2 April 1999.

It briefly served as the terminus of the Great Northern Railway when it was extended from Lochinvar. In May 1863 Greta lost its terminus status when the line was extended to Singleton.

Originally known as Farthing, it was renamed Greta in 1878. The station initially consisted of one platform with the current Platform 2 added in 1915 when the line was duplicated. The Platform 1 building was built in 1889, the Platform 2 shelter in 1915 and the footbridge in 1922.

== Platforms and services ==
Greta has two side platforms. It is serviced by Sydney Trains Hunter Line services travelling between Newcastle, Singleton Muswellbrook and Scone.

Platform	Line	Stopping pattern	Notes
1	Hunter Line	services to Newcastle	
2	Hunter Line	services to Singleton, Muswellbrook & Scone	

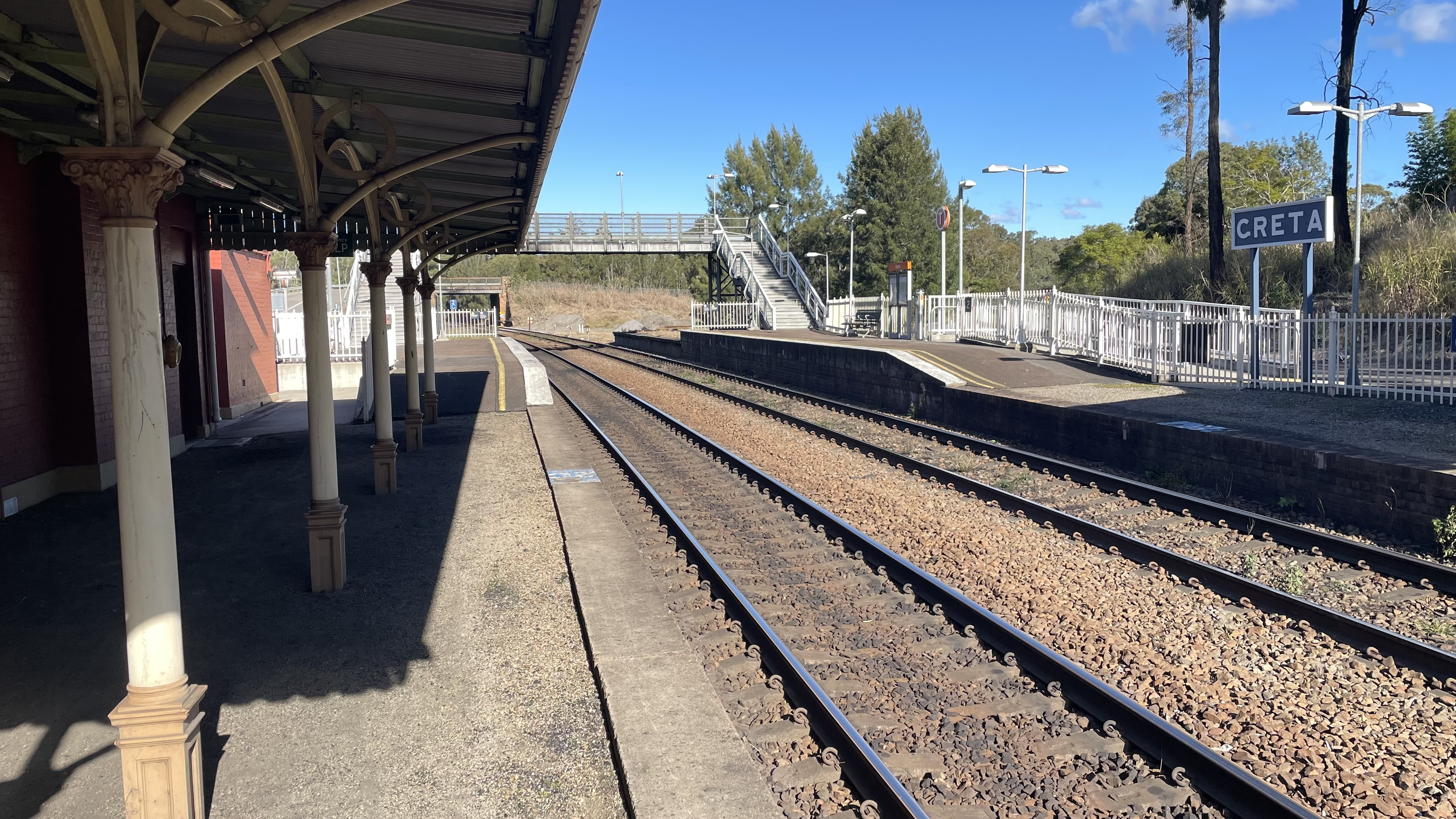
Southbound view on platform 1

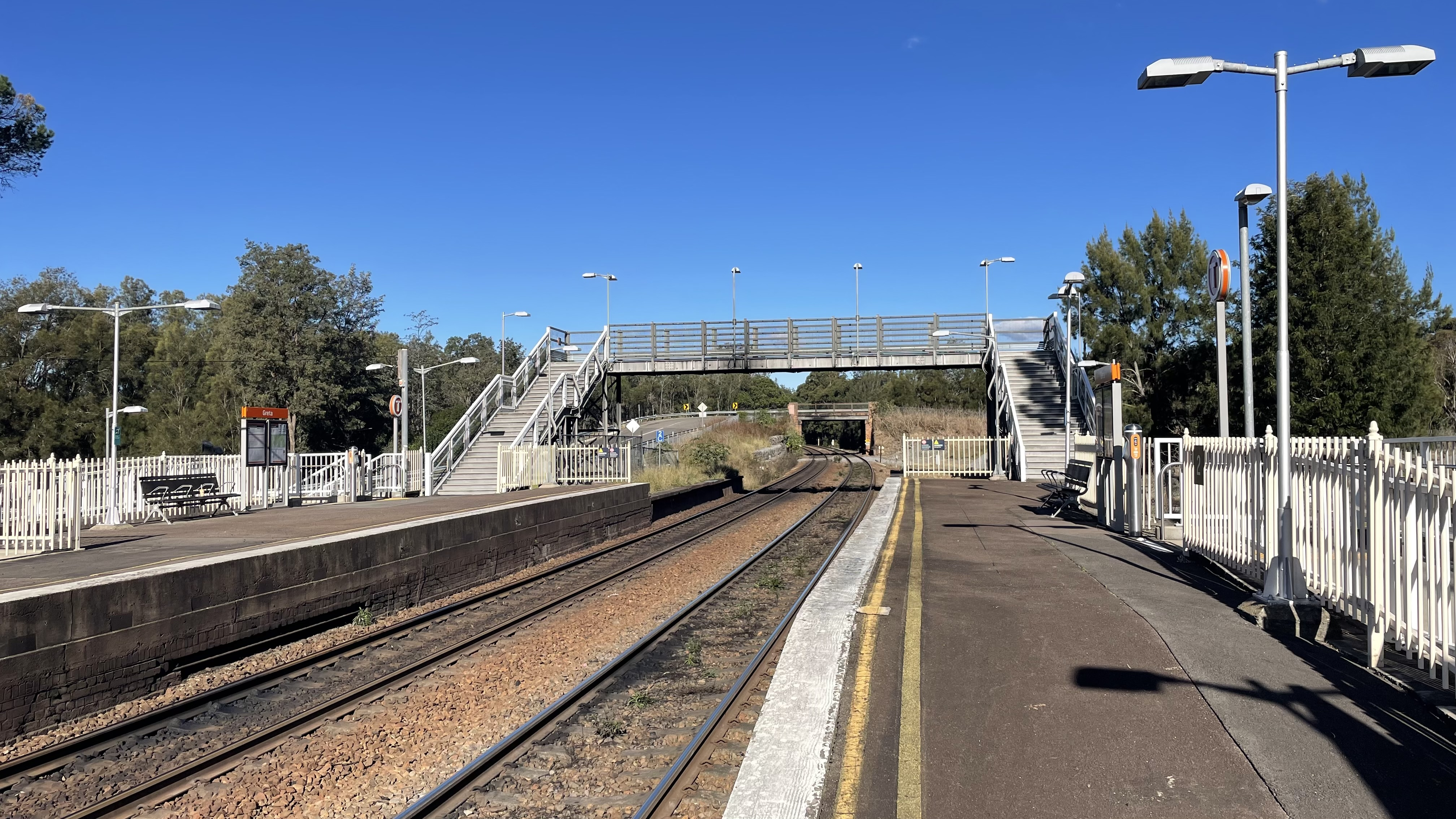
Southbound view on platform 2

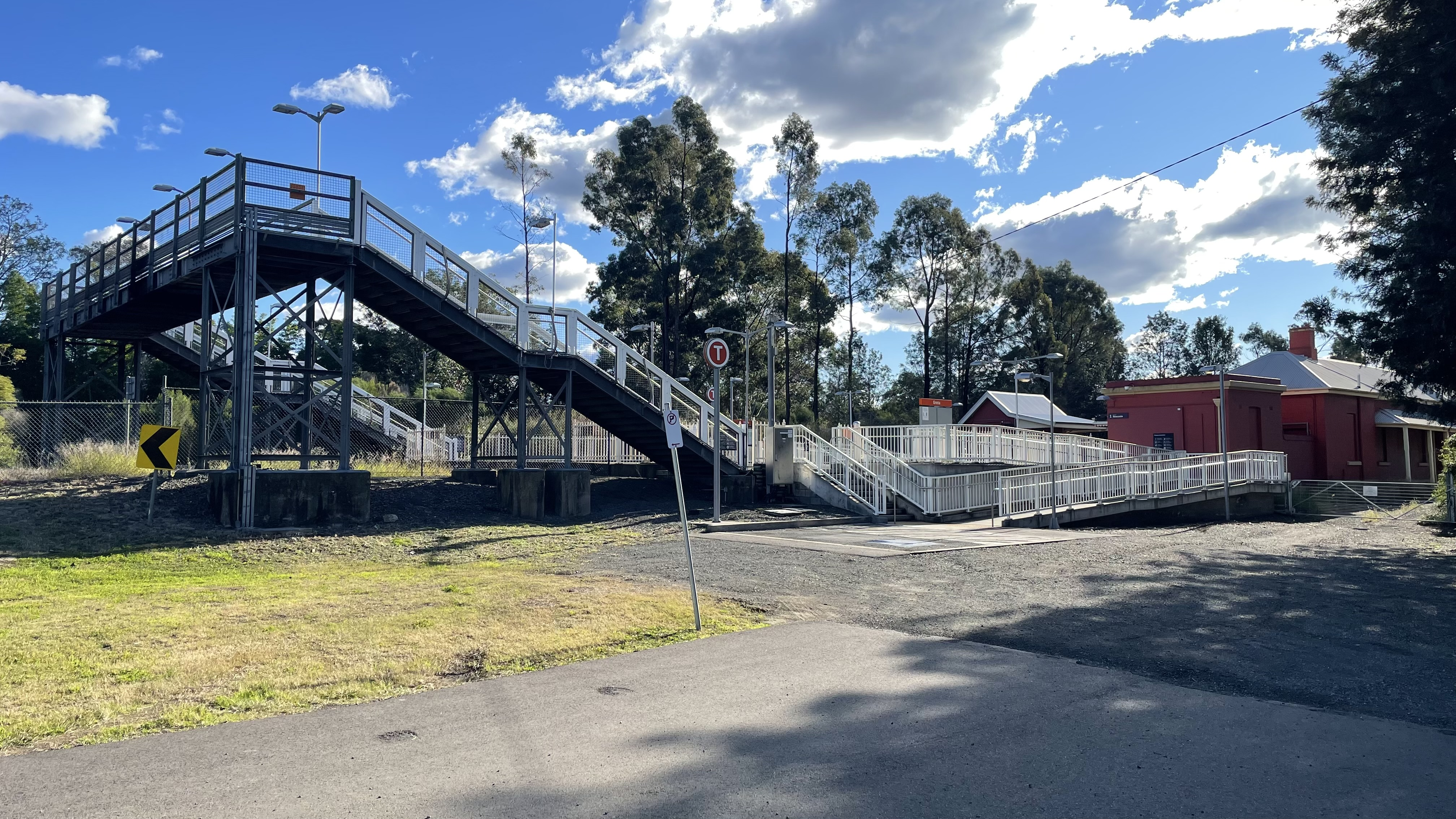
Entrance on Nelson Street

== Future ==
Cessnock, Maitland and Singleton councils released a series of planning documents in 2026 guiding urban development of the Anambah to Branxton corridor over the next several decades. The transport strategy proposed relocating Greta station to the south sometime after 2046. The reasons for moving the station are to reduce the impact of flooding and "enable more intensive and better-aligned development around the station".

The strategy proposes eventually increasing passenger train services through the station.

== Description ==
The heritage-listed complex includes the two station buildings: a second class wayside station of type 3 design dating from 1889, and a duplication station of type 11 design dating from 1915, with brick platform faces also from 1915. A c. 1899 parcels office, 1915 type 3 skillion roofed signal box and 1922 footbridge are also heritage-listed, as are the trees on the up side of the station and historic fencing, signs and lighting within the station complex.

== Heritage listing ==
Greta station group is perhaps the best late 19th century station group surviving from the period before the introduction of standard and economical construction methods around 1890. Its significance is enhanced by its intactness and completeness. The station building and residence (no longer owned by State Rail) are particularly fine buildings and the residence appears to be of unique design. The station building is the only surviving example of its kind without significant alteration. The site exhibits layering of different periods and styles, largely due to duplication and the need for additional buildings at that time. As new buildings were constructed at each stage and buildings were not extended (with the exception of the awning on the signal box) it displays a range of unaltered structures from various periods co-existing at one location. The footbridge, signs, lights, fencing and other details of the site add to the significance and completeness of the site and help create what is a unique small country railway station group.

Greta railway station was listed on the New South Wales State Heritage Register on 2 April 1999 having satisfied the following criteria.

The place possesses uncommon, rare or endangered aspects of the cultural or natural history of New South Wales.

This item is assessed as historically rare. This item is assessed as scientifically rare. This item is assessed as arch. rare. This item is assessed as socially rare.
