= Koolbury railway station =

Former railway station in New South Wales, Australia

Coordinates: 32°13′02″S 150°54′01″E

Koolbury is the name of a closed railway station on the Main North railway line in the Hunter Region of New South Wales, Australia. The station opened in 1909 and has been removed, no trace now remains.

Preceding station	Former services	Following station
Aberdeen towards Wallangarra	Main Northern Line	Muswellbrook towards Sydney
