= Lochinvar railway station =

Railway station in New South Wales, Australia

Lochinvar
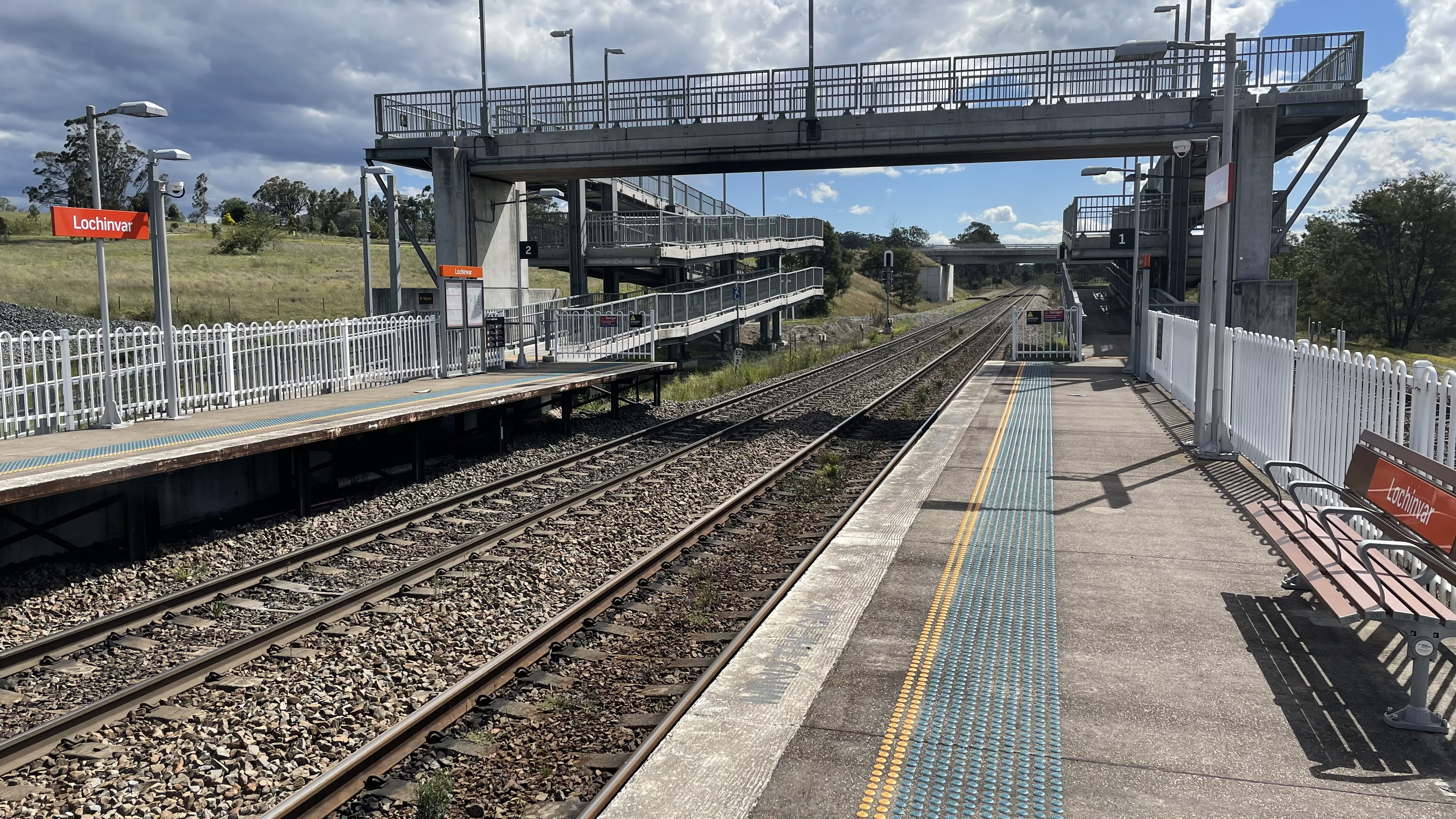
- View to footbridge

General information
- Location: Station Lane, Lochinvar; Australia
- Coordinates: 32°43′14″S 151°27′01″E
- Owner: Transport Asset Manager of New South Wales
- Operator: Sydney Trains
- Line: Main Northern
- Distance: 202.60 kilometres (125.89 mi) from Central
- Platforms: 2 side
- Tracks: 2

Construction
- Structure type: Ground
- Accessible: Assisted access

Other information
- Station code: LVR
- Website: Transport for NSW

History
- Opened: 2 July 1860

Passengers
- 2023: Less than 50 every month. (Sydney Trains, NSW TrainLink)

Services
Preceding station	Intercity Trains	Following station
Greta towards Scone	Hunter Line	Maitland towards Newcastle Interchange
Location

Lochinvar railway station is located on the Main Northern line in New South Wales, Australia. It serves the nearby town of Lochinvar opening on 2 July 1860.

It briefly served as the terminus of the Great Northern Railway when it was extended from Maitland. In March 1862 Lochinvar ceased to be a terminus when the line was extended to Greta.

A second platform was added in 1914 when the line was duplicated. As part of the Australian Rail Track Corporation's project to install a third track between Maitland and Whittingham, the station's platforms were extended and a footbridge installed in 2012.

Cessnock, Maitland and Singleton councils released a series of planning documents in 2026 guiding urban development of the Anambah to Branxton corridor over the next several decades. The transport strategy proposed upgrading Lochinvar station with longer platforms and a bus interchange. The upgrade was proposed to occur between 2036 and 2046.

Two new stations either side of Lochinvar were also proposed, West Rutherford to the east and Anvil Creek to the west.

The strategy proposes eventually increasing passenger train services through the station.

== Platforms and services ==
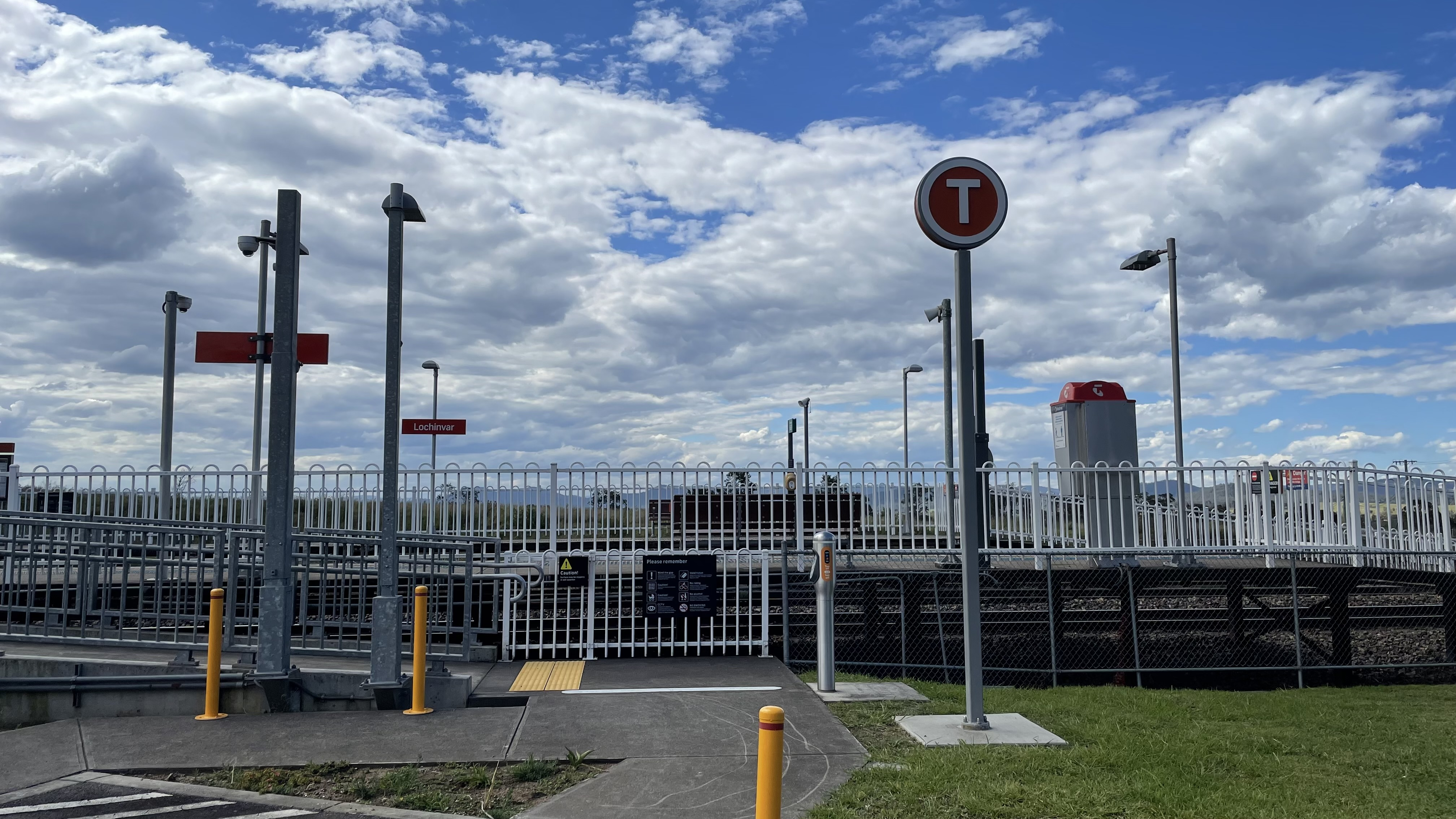
Entrance from the carpark

Lochinvar has two side platforms. It is serviced by Sydney Trains Hunter Line services travelling between Newcastle, Singleton, Muswellbrook and Scone.

Platform	Line	Stopping pattern	Notes
1	Hunter Line	services to Newcastle	
2	Hunter Line	services to Singleton, Muswellbrook & Scone	
