= Allandale railway station, New South Wales =

Former railway station in New South Wales, Australia

Allandale
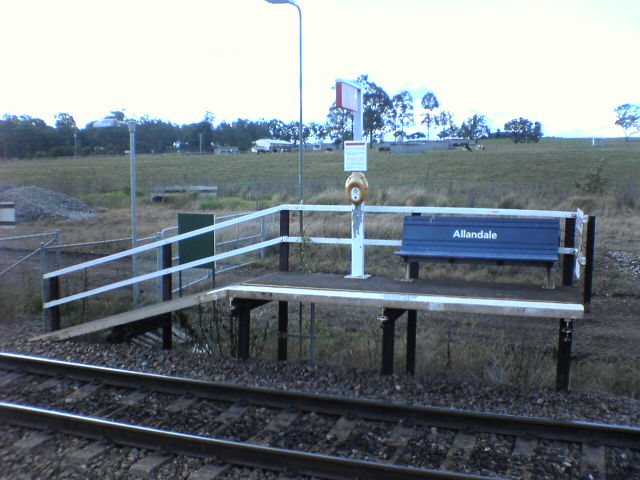
- One of the platforms before final closure in 2005.

General information
- Location: Allandale, New South Wales; Australia
- Coordinates: 32°43′16″S 151°24′55″E
- Line: Main North
- Platforms: 2
- Tracks: 2

Other information
- Status: Demolished

History
- Opened: 29 June 1869
- Closed: 9 September 2005

Services
Preceding station	Former services	Following station
Greta towards Wallangarra	Main Northern Line	Lochinvar towards Sydney
Location
- Location within New South Wales

Allandale railway station was a railway station serving the Hunter Region town of Allandale. Opening to passenger services in 1869, it originally consisted of two brick platforms. The original station closed on 7 September 1978, and the station was demolished. It was later reopened with smaller platforms, before being temporarily closed in 2002 due to the nearby bridge construction, and finally permanently closed on 9 September 2005, after railway works by the Australian Rail Track Corporation. There is no sign of the station now.

It was planned in the 1870s to construct a branch from this station towards Wollombi, roughly around the Great North Road corridor; advocacy from certain Maitland-based groups began in the 1840s. This plan, however, never came to fruition.
