= Greta, New South Wales =

Town in New South Wales, Australia

Greta
- Town
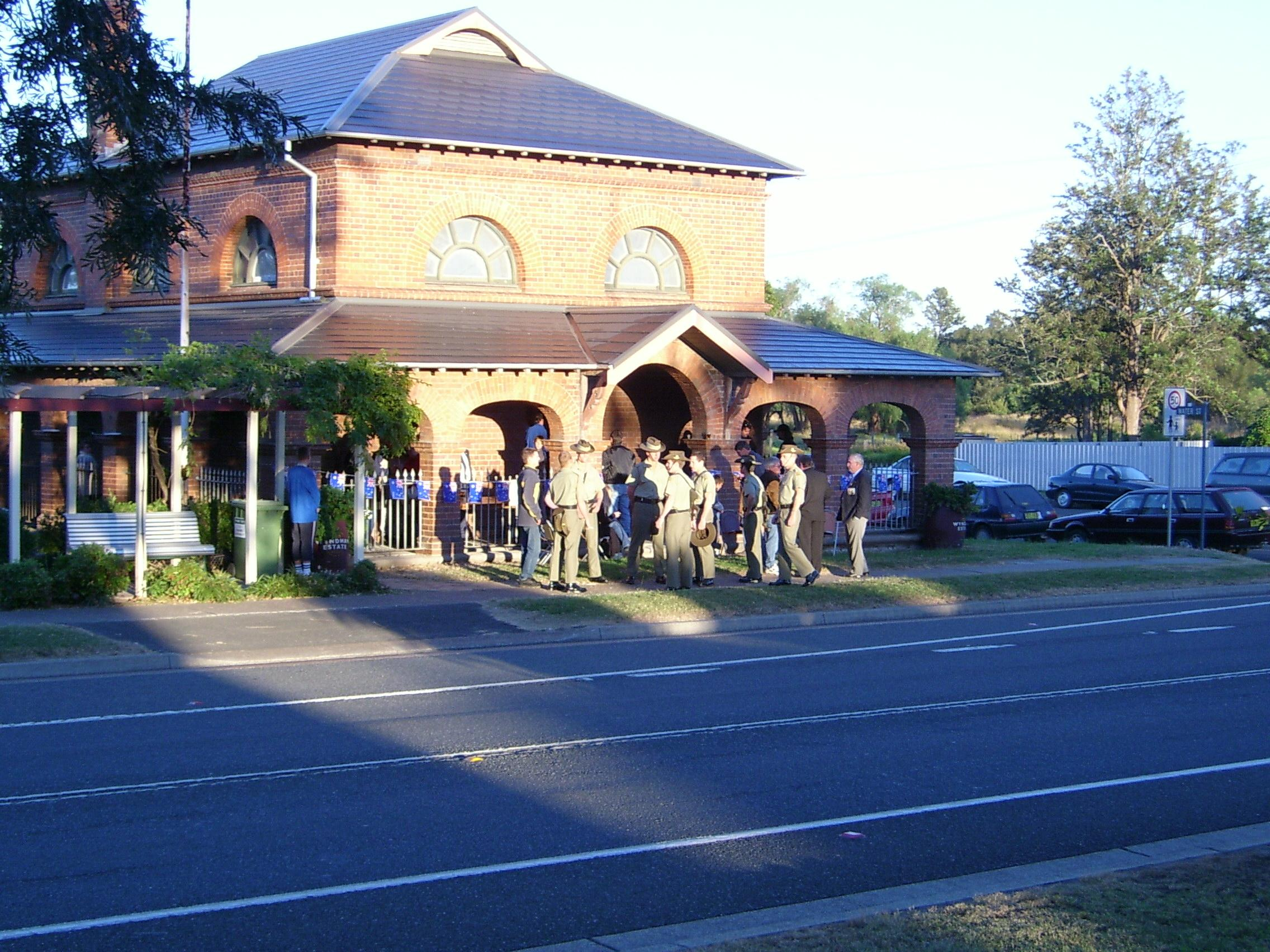
- Greta's historic court house

- Coordinates: 32°41′14″S 151°23′4″E
- Country: Australia
- State: New South Wales
- Region: Hunter
- City: Cessnock
- LGAs: City of Cessnock; City of Maitland
- Location: 183 km (114 mi) N of Sydney; 53 km (33 mi) WNW of Newcastle; 21 km (13 mi) N of Cessnock; 20 km (12 mi) W of Maitland; 27 km (17 mi) ESE of Singleton

Government
  - State electorate: Cessnock
  - Federal division: Hunter

Area (Note: This is the area of the town, not the entire suburb.)
  - Total: 5.1 km^{2} (2.0 sq mi)
- Elevation (Note: Average elevation of the suburb as shown on 1:100000 map 9132 Cessnock.): 70 m (230 ft)

Population
  - Total: 2,830 (2016 census) (Note: ABS QuickStats only provides population data for the town of Greta, not the entire suburb.)
  - Density: 486.9/km^{2} (1,261/sq mi) (Note: This is the average density of the actual town, based on figures provided by the ABS.)
- Time zone: UTC+10 (AEST)
  - Summer (DST): UTC+11 (AEDT)
- Postcode: 2334
- County: Northumberland
- Parish: Branxton
Localities around Greta
| Branxton, East Branxton | Leconfield | Luskintyre |
| North Rothbury | Greta | Oswald, Harpers Hill |
| Rothbury | Allandale, Rothbury | Allandale |

Greta is a small town in the Hunter Valley, New South Wales, Australia.

== History ==
The traditional owners and custodians of the Maitland area are the Wonnarua people. The Greta area was first colonised by Europeans around Anvil Creek in the 1830s.

When the town was surveyed in 1842 it was given the name Greta, possibly after a small river in Cumberland, England. Coal mining was established in the area in 1862 with the development of a railway station.

In 1864, kerosene shale was discovered. By the 1870s, Greta had four hotels, four churches, a school and schools of arts. Geologist Edgeworth David discovered the Greta Coal Seam in 1886. By 1907, ten collieries were in operation. The Whitburn Rail line; which extended off the Main Northern railway line 400 metres to the west of the Greta railway station connected to the Greta Colliery, Leconfield Colliery and Whitburn Colliery. The line was Closed on the 3rd of October 1957 when the Leconfield Colliery shut down.

At the 2016 census, the town had a population of 2,830. Greta's population increased to 3,349 at the 2021 census.

== Vehicle crash ==
In June 2023, a roundabout on Wine Country Drive in Greta was the site of a bus crash that killed 10 people. A memorial was built on the junction between the A43 and New England Highway.

== Greta Army Camp ==
The Greta Army Camp, located on the town's outskirts, was opened in 1939 as a training ground for World War II soldier training, and in 1949 was transferred to the Department of Immigration who transformed it into one of Australia's largest migrant reception and training centres between June 1949 and January 1960 as part of the post-war immigration to Australia. Over 100,000 new migrants seeking a new life in Australia passed through Greta Camp throughout its 11-years in operation.The location is now under private property and there are few remains of the camp on the property

== Transport ==
Greta is located on the New England Highway, approximately 183 km (114 mi) north of Sydney. Access to Sydney will be possible via the Hunter Expressway. NSW TrainLink's Hunter Line passes through Greta railway station, which opened in 1869.

Hunter Valley Buses operates three bus routes through the village of Greta:

- 179: Stockland Greenhills to North Rothbury via East Maitland, Maitland, Rutherford, Lochinvar, Branxton
- 180: Stockland Greenhills to Singleton Heights via East Maitland, Maitland, Rutherford, Lochinvar, Branxton and Singleton
- 180X: Maitland station to Singleton station via Lochinvar and Branxton

== Heritage listings ==
Greta has the Greta railway station.

== Images of Greta ==
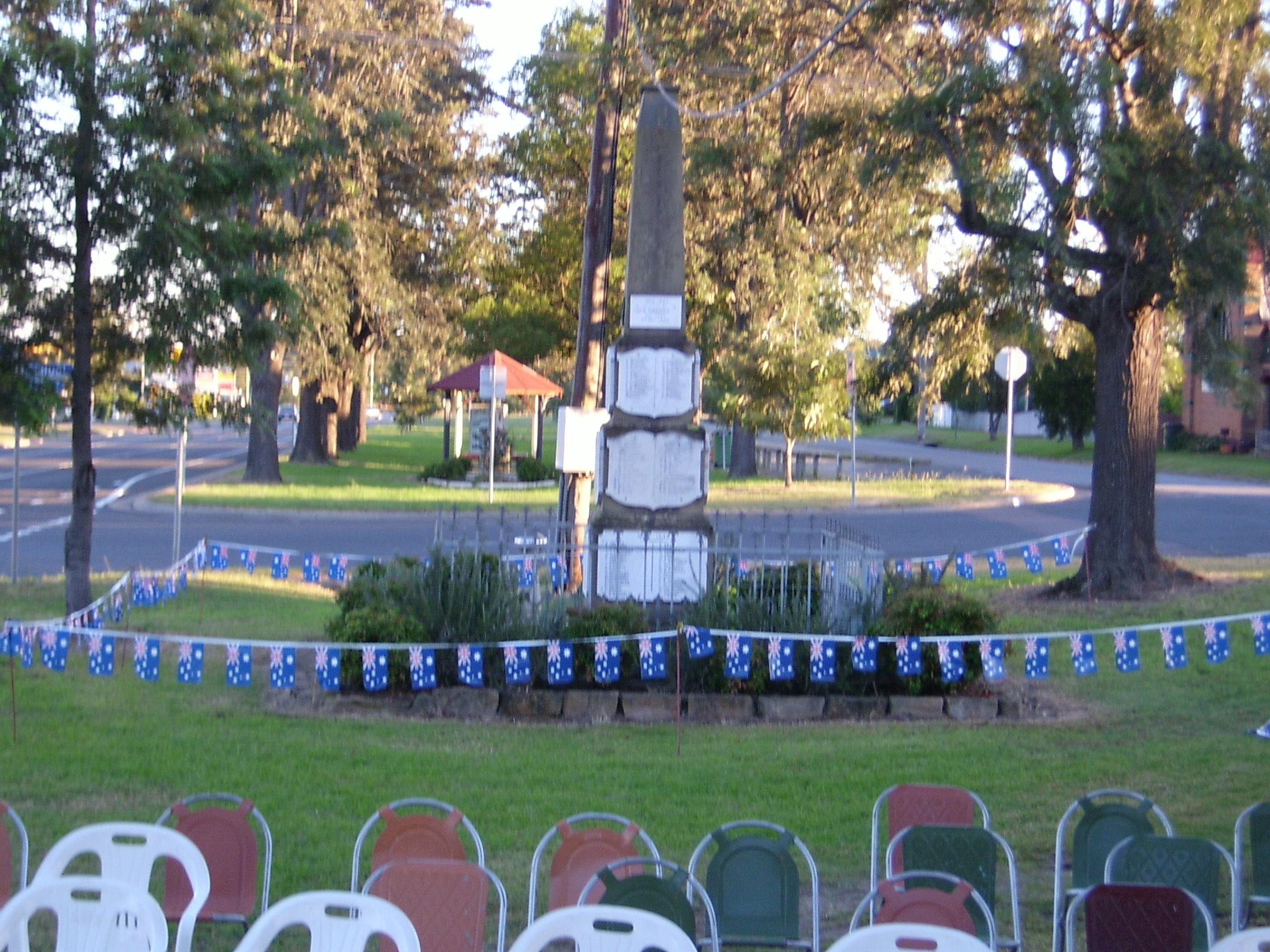
Greta war memorial cenotaph

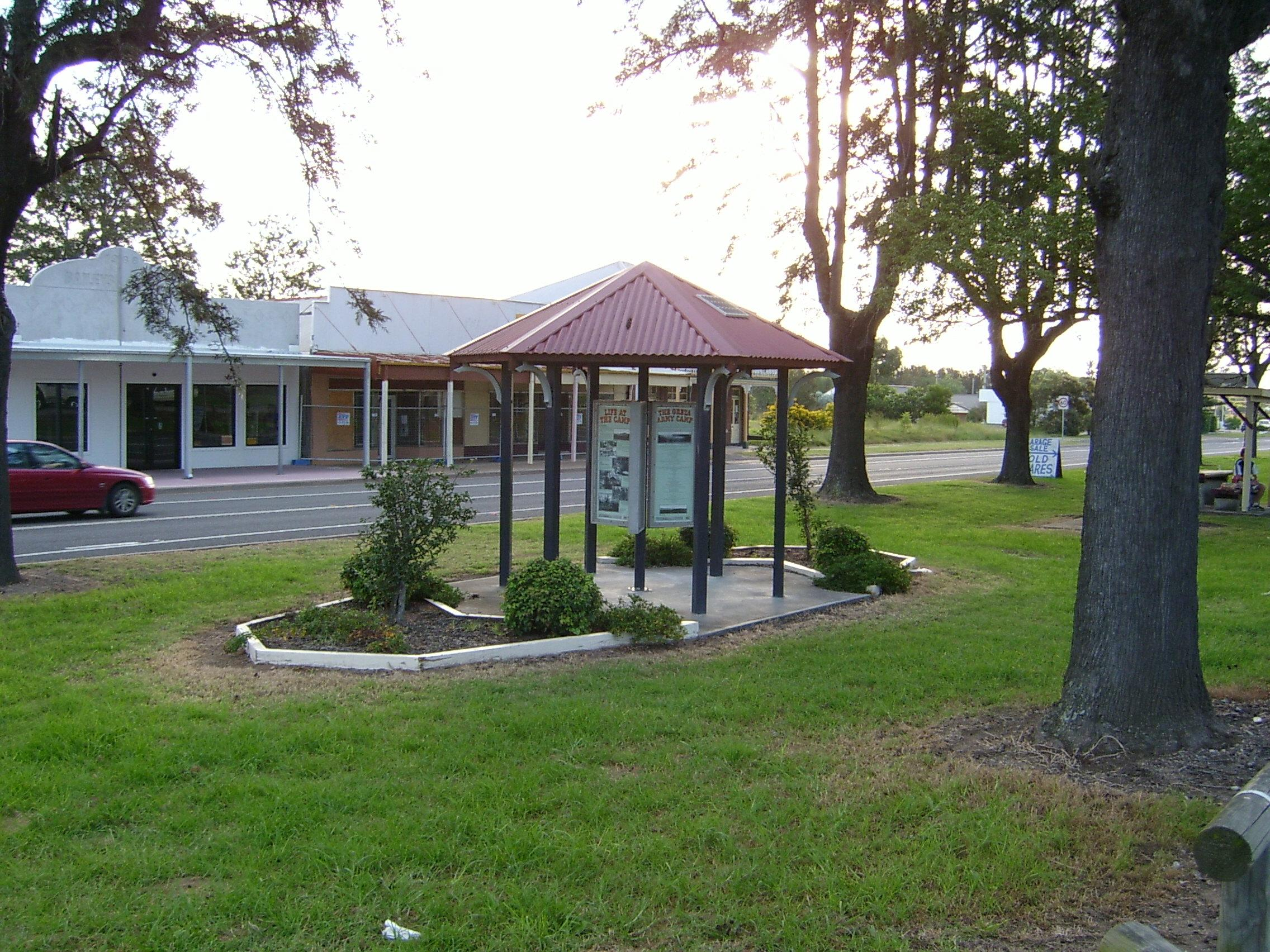
Greta rest area shelter

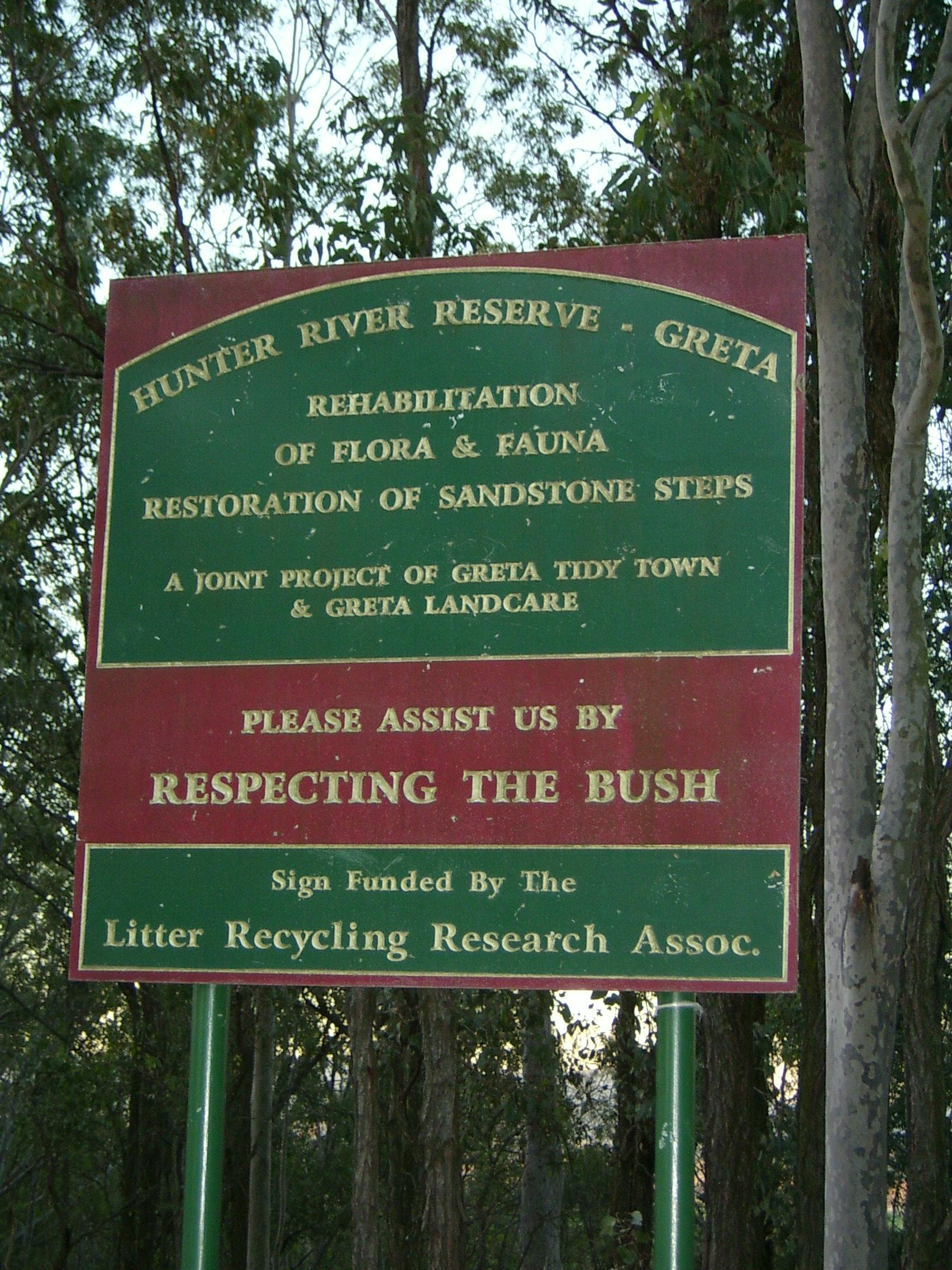
The welcoming sign to Greta's Hunter River catchment area

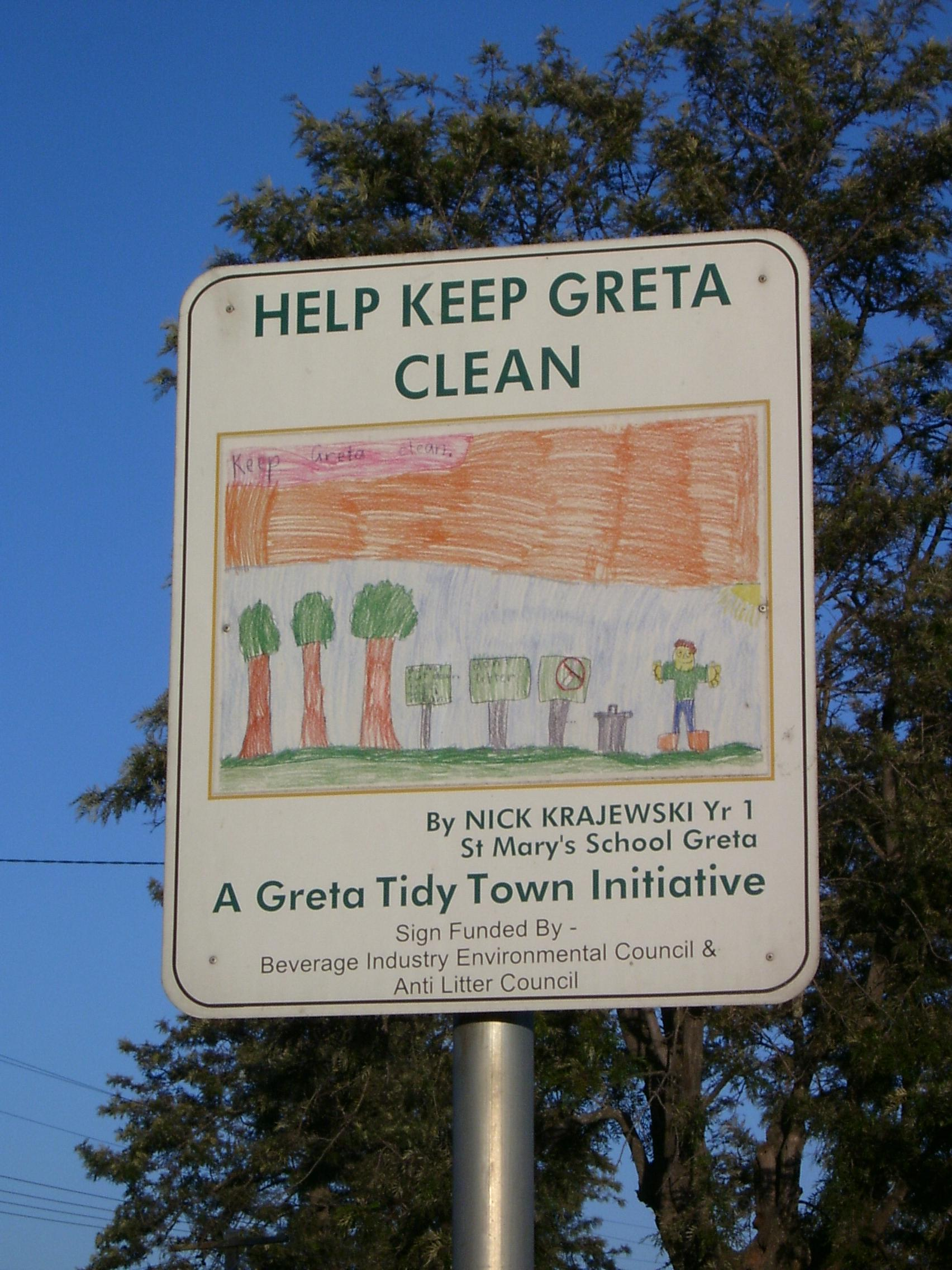
A child's litter prevention sign. These signs were commissioned by Greta Tidy Towns to help children understand the importance of maintaining a tidy town
