= BNX =

BNX may refer to:

- Banja Luka International Airport
- Branxton railway station, New South Wales
- Benoxinate, a local anaesthetic agent
- bnx, device name assigned by Solaris operating systems to Broadcom NetXtreme II Gigabit Ethernet adapters
