= Aberdeen railway station, New South Wales =

Railway station in New South Wales, Australia

Aberdeen
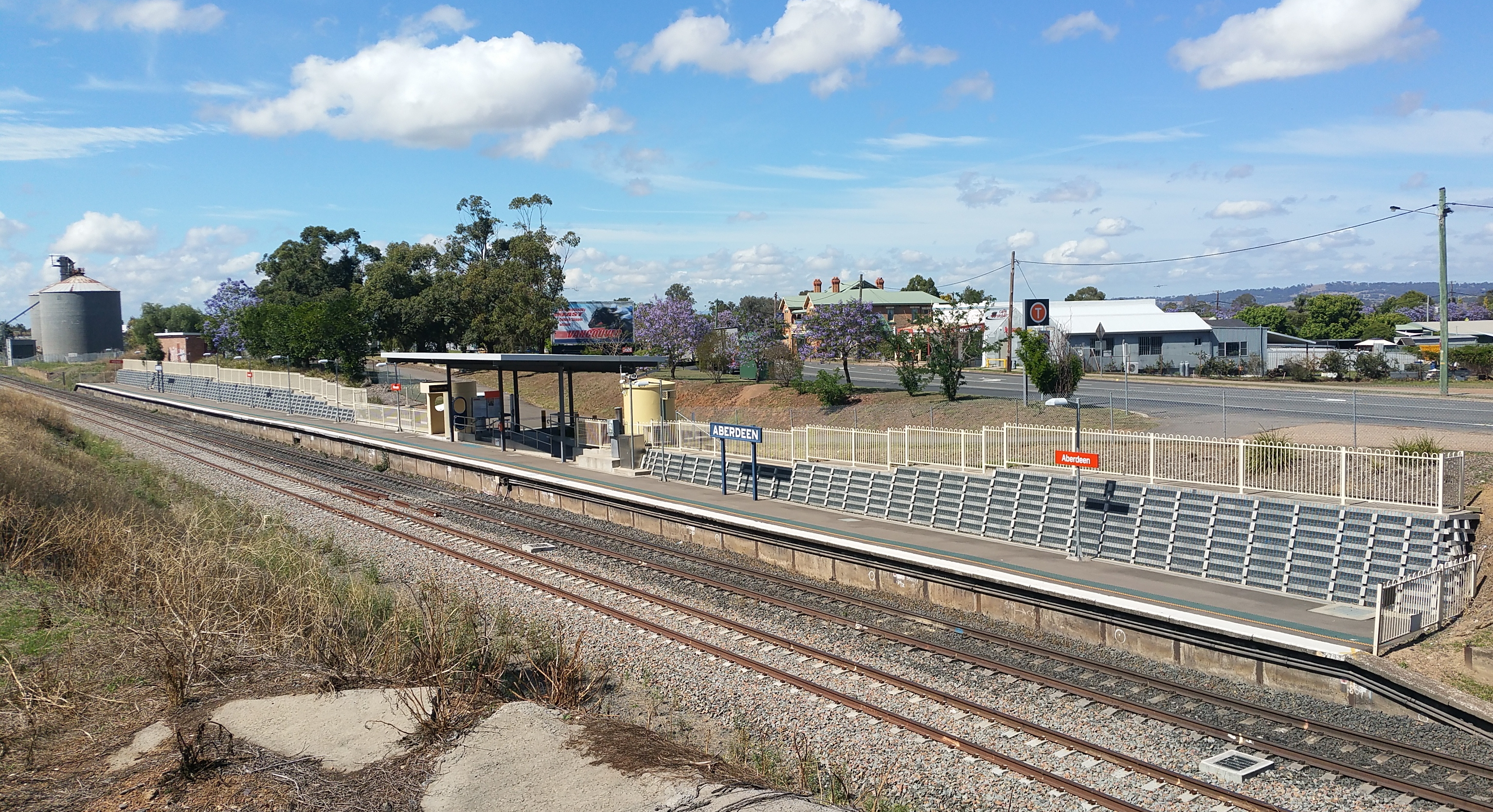
- Southbound view of station in November 2017

General information
- Location: New England Highway, Aberdeen; New South Wales; Australia
- Coordinates: 32°10′02″S 150°53′31″E
- Owner: Transport Asset Manager of NSW
- Operator: NSW TrainLink; Sydney Trains
- Line: Main North
- Distance: 300.73 km (186.86 mi) from Central
- Platforms: 1 (1 side)
- Tracks: 2

Construction
- Structure type: Ground
- Accessible: Yes

Other information
- Station code: ABD
- Website: Transport for NSW

History
- Opened: 20 October 1870 (155 years ago)

Passengers
- 2025: Less than 50 every month. (Sydney Trains, NSW TrainLink)

Services
Preceding station	Intercity Trains	Following station
Scone Terminus	Hunter Line	Muswellbrook towards Newcastle Interchange
Preceding station	NSW TrainLink	Following station
Scone towards Moree or Armidale	NSW TrainLink North Western Line	Muswellbrook towards Sydney
Location

Aberdeen railway station is an intercity railway station located on the Main North line, serving the Hunter Valley town of Aberdeen. It is served by Sydney Trains Intercity Hunter Line and NSW TrainLink North Western Region services.

== History ==
Aberdeen opened on 20 August 1870. The station was completely rebuilt in 1899, as part of works to remove level crossings within the town. These works included the demolition of the original station buildings, the lowering of the station by 3.0 metres (10 ft) and the raising of nearby streets with excess material from the railway cuttings.

In 2010, the station was refurbished, with a new shelter and retaining walls built.

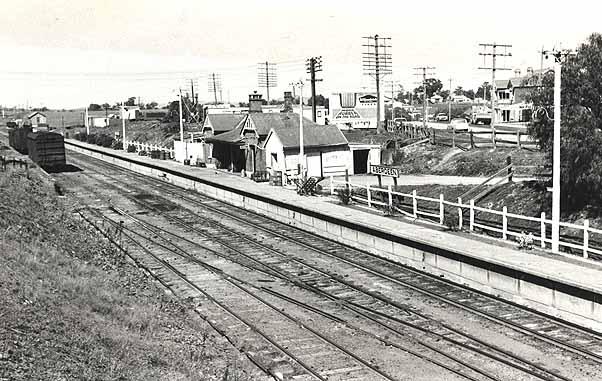
The station in the 1950s

== Services ==
=== Platforms ===
The station has one platform and a passing loop. It is serviced by Sydney Trains Hunter Line services travelling between Newcastle and Scone.

There are three services in each direction on weekdays, with two on weekends and public holidays.

It is also served by NSW TrainLink Xplorer services from Sydney to Armidale and Moree. This station is a request stop for the service, so the train only stops here if passengers have booked to board/alight here.

Platform	Line	Stopping pattern	Notes
1	HUN	services to Newcastle & Scone	
1	North Western Region	services to Armidale/Moree & Sydney Central	request stop (booked passengers only)

== Gallery ==
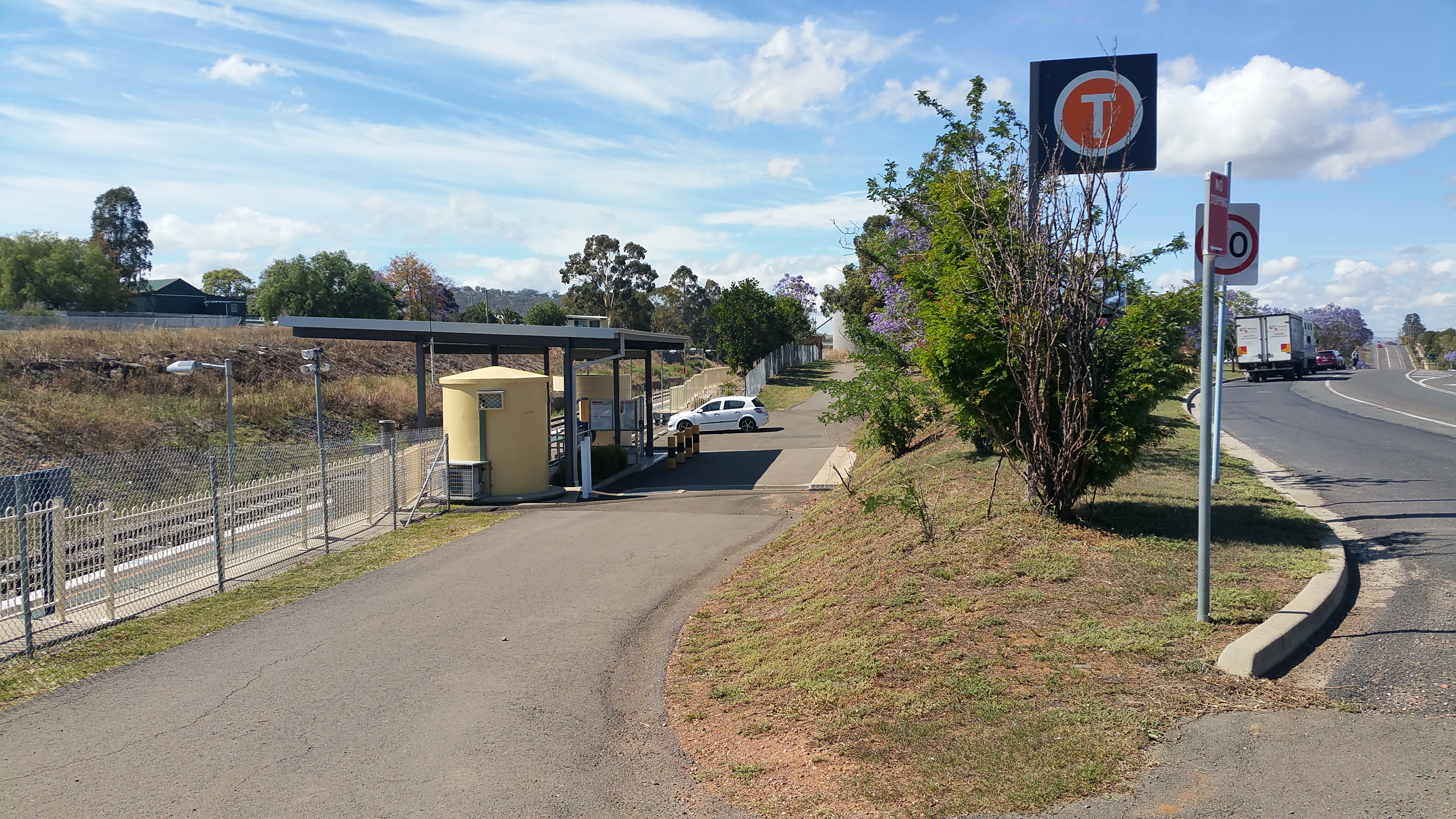
Entrance on New England Highway

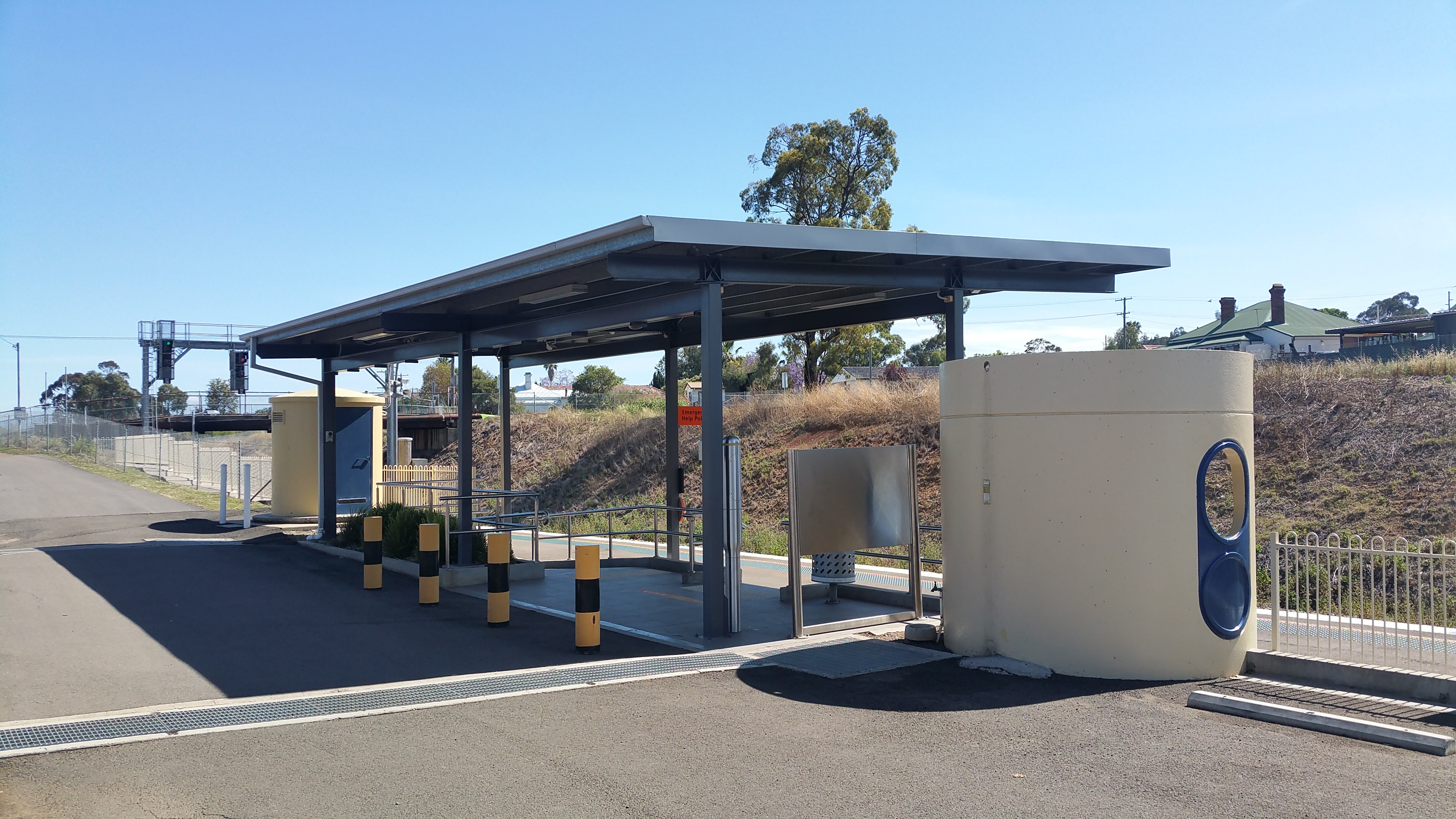
Station Shelter

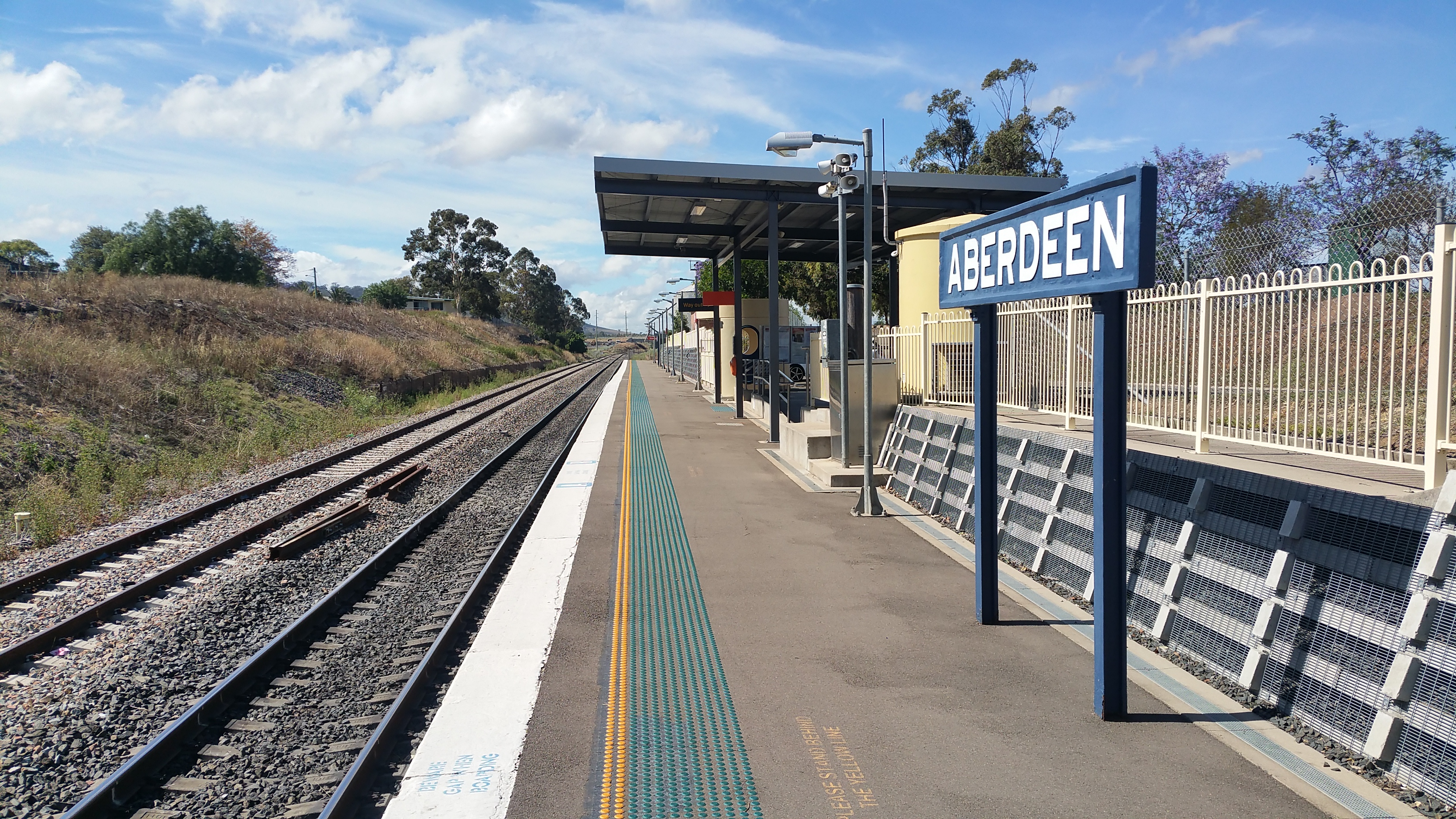
Southbound view on platform

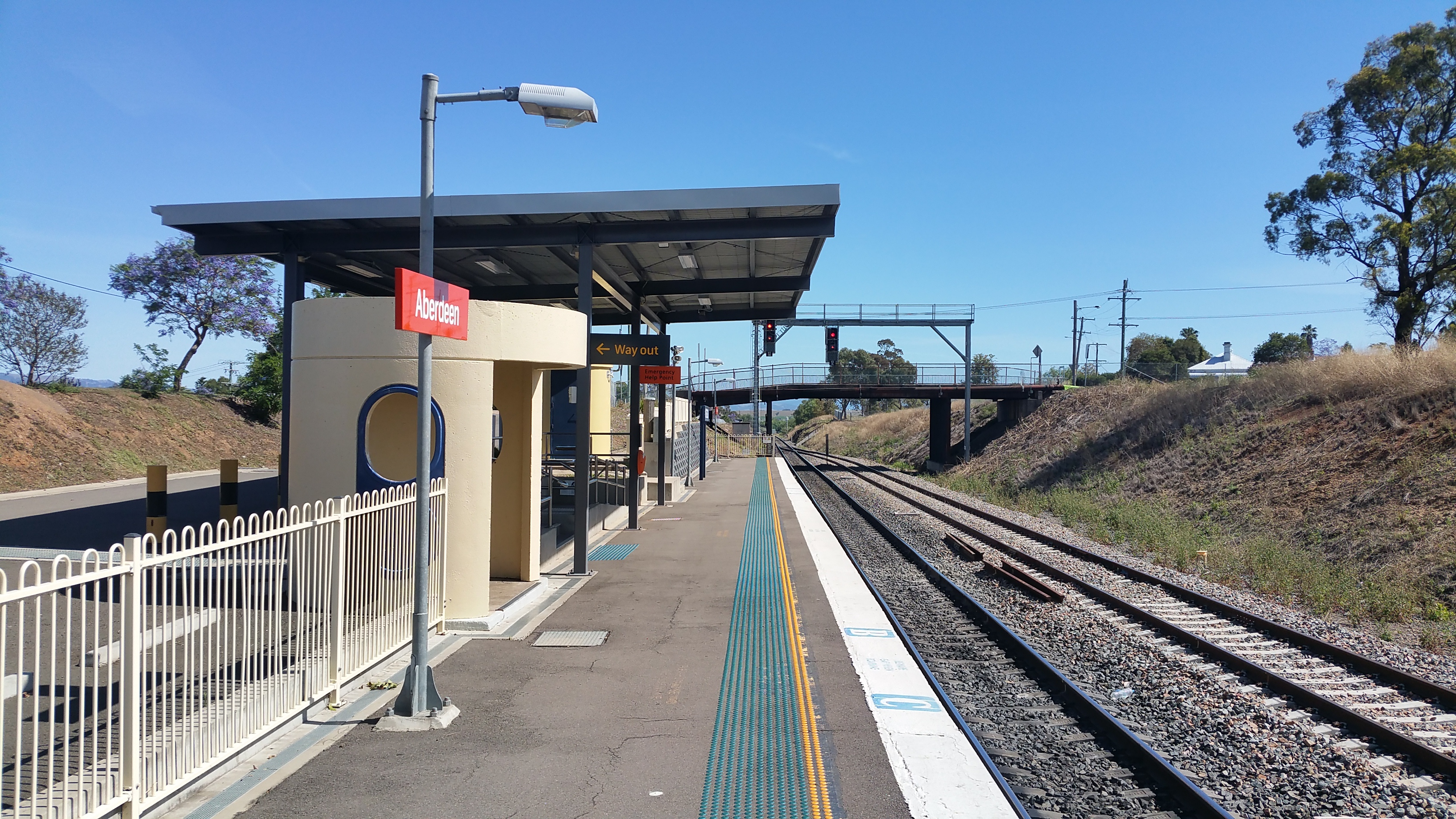
Northbound view on platform
