= Branxton railway station =

Railway station in New South Wales, Australia

Branxton
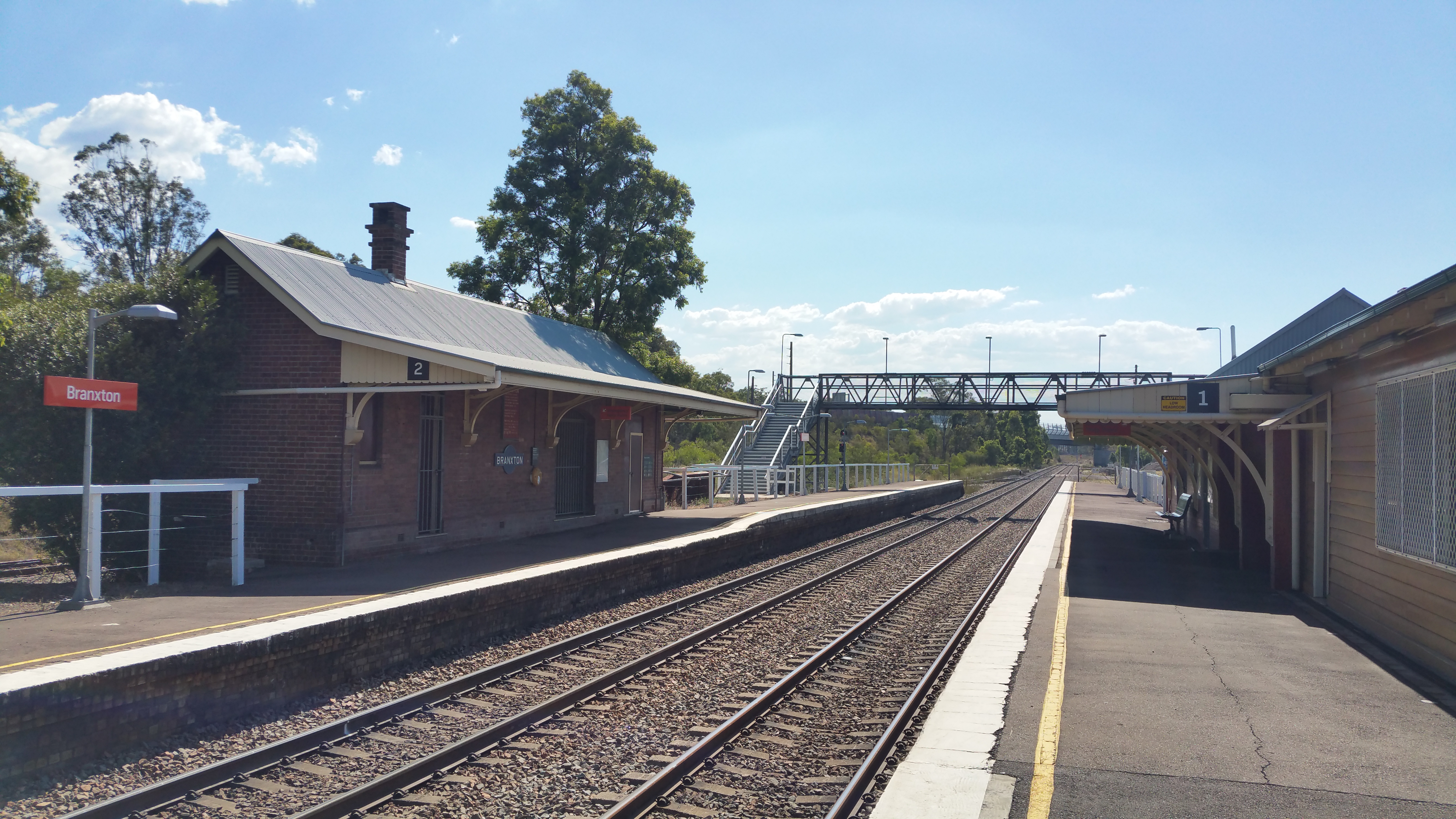
- Station looking west in February 2017

General information
- Location: Railway Street, Branxton; Australia
- Coordinates: 32°39′44″S 151°20′44″E
- Owner: Transport Asset Manager of New South Wales
- Operator: Sydney Trains
- Line: Main Northern
- Distance: 215.55 kilometres (133.94 mi) from Central
- Platforms: 2 side
- Tracks: 2

Construction
- Structure type: Ground

Other information
- Station code: BNX
- Website: Transport for NSW

History
- Opened: 24 March 1862

Passengers
- 2025: 4,354 (year); 12 (daily) (Sydney Trains, NSW TrainLink)

Services
Preceding station	Intercity Trains	Following station
Singleton towards Scone	Hunter Line	Greta towards Newcastle Interchange
Former services
Preceding station	Former services	Following station
Belford towards Wallangarra	Main Northern Line (1869–2005)	Greta towards Sydney
Location

Branxton railway station is a heritage-listed railway station located on the Main Northern line in New South Wales, Australia. It serves the town of Branxton opening on 24 March 1862. It was added to the New South Wales State Heritage Register on 2 April 1999.

A crossing loop previously ran behind Platform 2 but this has now been taken out of use. To the south-west of the station, is a branch to the Hunter Valley Railway Trust's North Rothbury museum.

Cessnock, Maitland and Singleton councils released a series of planning documents in 2026 guiding urban development of the Anambah to Branxton corridor over the next several decades. The transport strategy proposed upgrading Branxton station with longer platforms and a bus interchange. The upgrade was proposed to occur between 2036 and 2046.

The strategy proposes eventually increasing passenger train services through the station.

== Platforms and services ==
Branxton has two side platforms. It is serviced by Sydney Trains Hunter Line services travelling between Newcastle, Singleton, Muswellbrook and Scone.

Platform	Line	Stopping pattern	Notes
1	Hunter Line	services to Newcastle	
2	Hunter Line	services to Singleton, Muswellbrook & Scone	

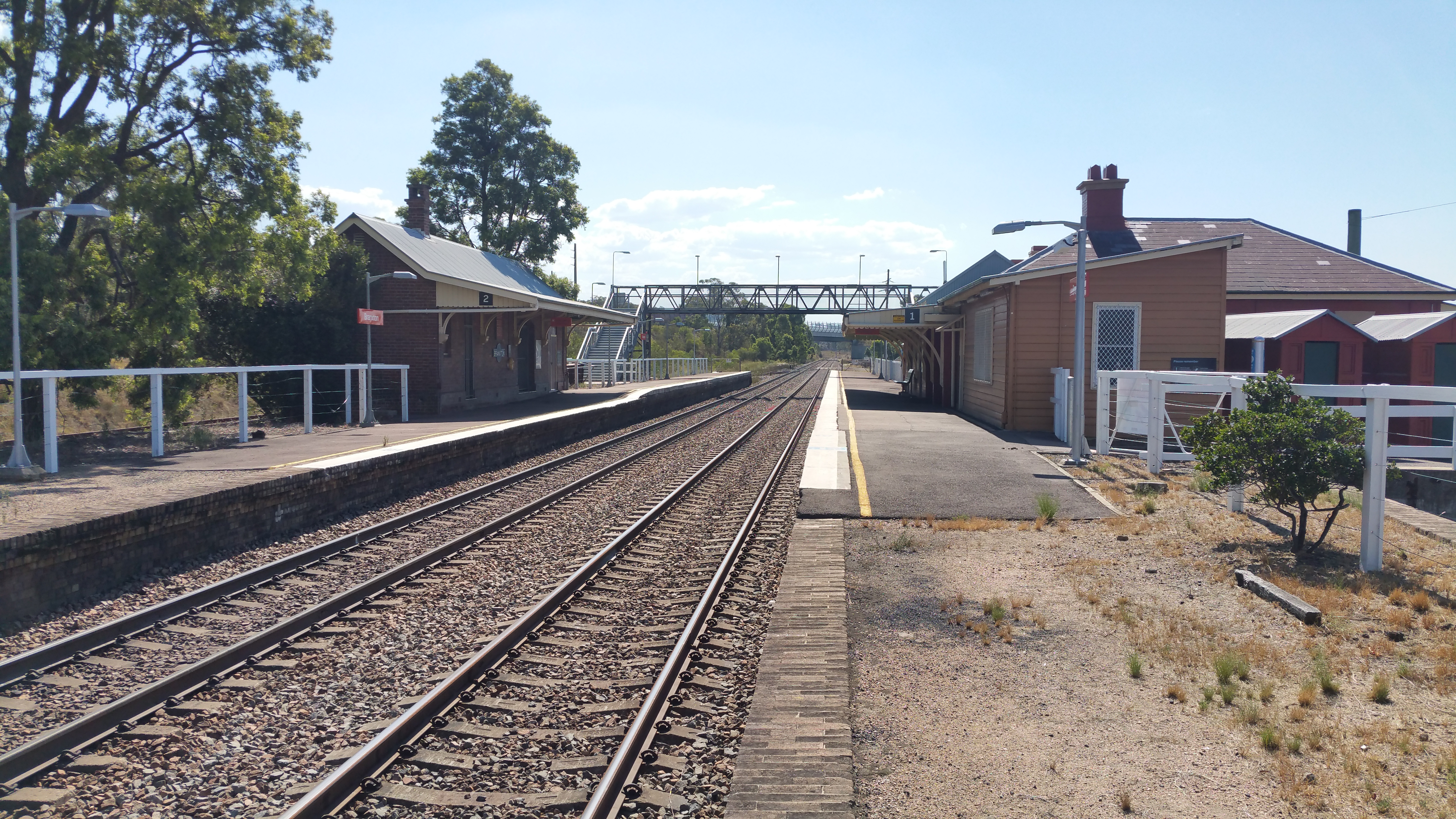
Northbound view on Platform 1

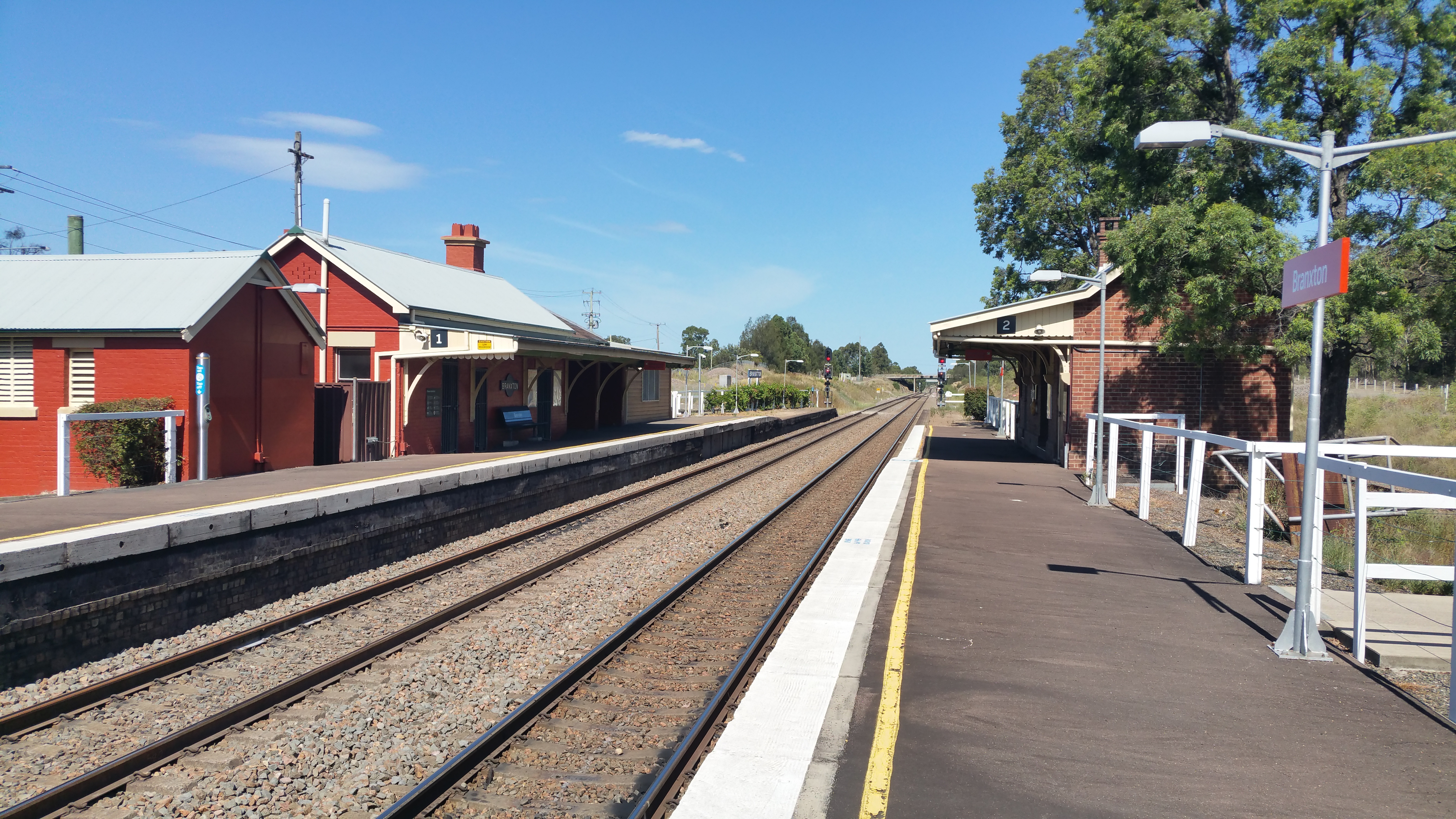
Southbound view on Platform 2

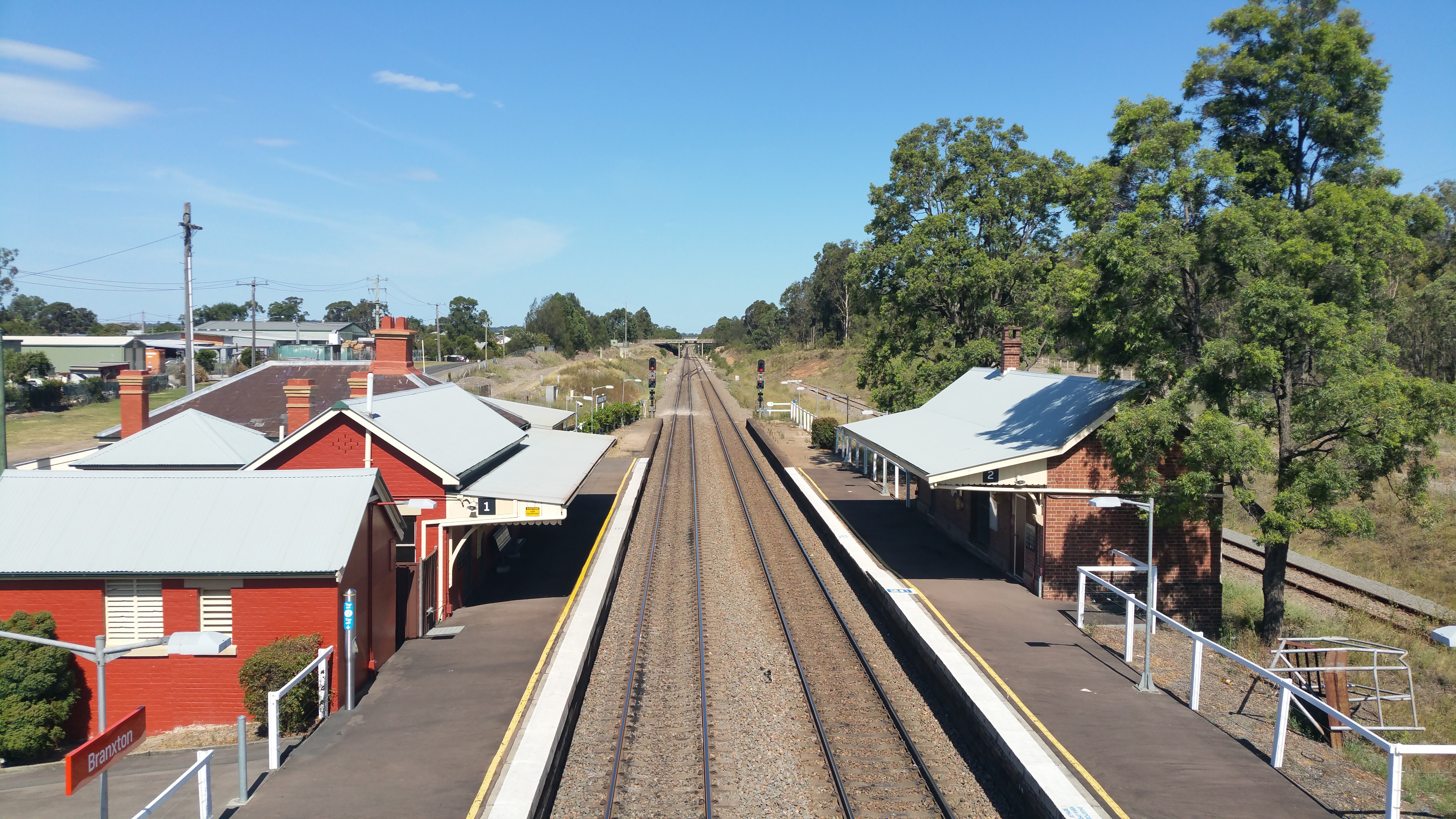
View from Footbridge

== Description ==
The up platform station building is a brick combination office/residence of type 1 design, originally dating from 1862 with alterations in the 1880s and again in 1915. The down platform station building is a brick island building dating of type 11 design from duplication in 1915. The platform faces were completed in brick with a dock platform.

A timber, skillion roofed signal box with remaining telegraph wires and poles (c. 1915), a timber store, a steel footbridge (c. 1915), the concrete base of a JC Commenson T431 5 ton jib crane, and signs, seats, and fences including examples from different periods of railway development are all included within the heritage listing.

A Pooley 5 ton weighing machine was recorded in the initial heritage listing, but was found to be not existent in 2004. The original double light colour light, metropolitan-style signals from 1946 were replaced c. 2000 with standard colour light signals.

== Heritage listing ==
Branxton features some of the earliest buildings on the northern line. The substantial nature of the buildings reflects the importance once attached to the town and its station. The original station incorporated a rare example of a residence (1 of 5 similar structures in the State). The group exhibits the effects of duplication and the addition of structures from later periods including several additions to the 1862 building during the 1880s and again in 1914 to make a substantial main line railway group.

The group is one of the most interesting and important sites surviving in the State.

Branxton railway station was listed on the New South Wales State Heritage Register on 2 April 1999 having satisfied the following criteria.

The place possesses uncommon, rare or endangered aspects of the cultural or natural history of New South Wales.

This item is assessed as historically rare. This item is assessed as scientifically rare. This item is assessed as arch. rare. This item is assessed as socially rare.
