= Whittingham railway station =

Former railway station in New South Wales, Australia

Whittingham

General information
- Location: Whittingham, New South Wales; Australia
- Coordinates: 32°36′17″S 151°12′01″E
- Line: Main North
- Distance: 233.999 kilometres from Central
- Platforms: 2 (2 side)
- Tracks: 2

Other information
- Status: Demolished

History
- Opened: 6 September 1869
- Closed: 1984
- Former names: Falkner's Platform (1869-1877)

Services
Preceding station	Former services	Following station
Singleton towards Wallangarra	Main Northern Line	Minimbah towards Sydney
Location

Whittingham railway station was a railway station on the Main North railway line, serving the locality of Whittingham in the Hunter Region, New South Wales.

It opened on 6 September 1869 as Falkner's Platform (also written as Falkner's). It was upgraded from a platform to a station and renamed Whittingham in February 1877, at which time a ticket office and waiting room was built and stationmaster appointed. It was for many years the railway access point for the Singleton Army Camp. From 1921 to 1931, it was also an access point for the Singleton Racing Club's short-lived Whittingham Racecourse, which was adjacent to the station. A minor derailment occurred at the station in 1945 when a shunting engine went through the points. It last served passengers in 1984 and the station was subsequently demolished after closure.

== Coal ==
A junction was built at Whittingham in the 1970s for a coal branch to a coal mine at Mount Thorley and later for the Saxonvale, Wambo and Warkworth collieries.
