= Singleton railway station, New South Wales =

Railway station in New South Wales, Australia

Singleton
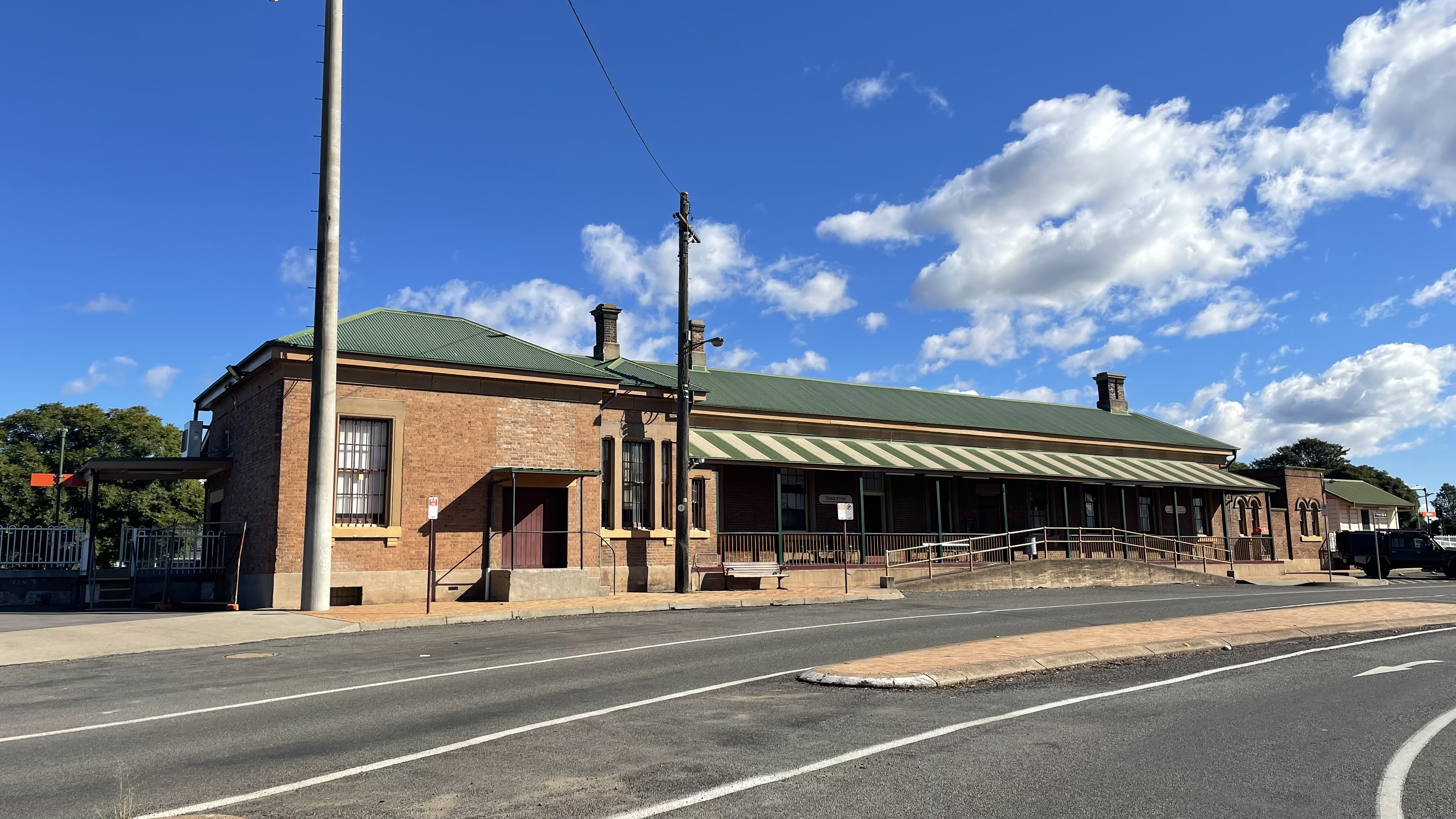
- Station building in June 2024

General information
- Location: Munro Lane, Singleton; Australia
- Coordinates: 32°34′19″S 151°09′55″E
- Owner: Transport Asset Manager of New South Wales
- Operator: Sydney Trains
- Line: Main Northern
- Distance: 238.89 kilometres (148.44 mi) from Central
- Platforms: 1
- Tracks: 3
- Connections: Bus

Construction
- Structure type: Ground
- Accessible: Yes

Other information
- Status: Weekdays: Staffed: 6.15am–2.15pm: Weekends and public holidays: Unstaffed
- Station code: SIX
- Website: Transport for NSW

History
- Opened: 7 May 1863

Passengers
- 2025: 16,251 (year); 45 (daily) (Sydney Trains, NSW TrainLink)

Services
Preceding station	Intercity Trains	Following station
Muswellbrook towards Scone	Hunter Line	Branxton towards Newcastle Interchange
Preceding station	NSW TrainLink	Following station
Muswellbrook towards Moree or Armidale	NSW TrainLink North Western Line	Maitland towards Sydney
Former services
Preceding station	Former services	Following station
Nundah towards Wallangarra	Main Northern Line (1952–1975)	Whittingham towards Sydney
Muswellbrook towards Wallangarra	Main Northern Line (1975–1984)	Whittingham towards Sydney
Location

Singleton railway station is a heritage-listed railway station located on the Main Northern line in New South Wales, Australia. It serves the town of Singleton. It was added to the New South Wales State Heritage Register on 2 April 1999.

== History ==
The station opened on 7 May 1863.

The original, listed 1863 John Whitton brick station building remains. It opened as the terminus of the Great Northern Railway when it was extended from Branxton. In 1869, Singleton lost its terminus status when the line was extended north to Muswellbrook. It had a freight yard including locomotive servicing facilities. The line from Whittingham was duplicated in 1951.

Singleton was the stabling point for the last regular steam locomotive passenger service in Australia, a peak hour service to Newcastle that ceased in July 1971.

== Platforms and services ==
Singleton has one platform. It is serviced by Sydney Trains Hunter Line services travelling between Newcastle, Muswellbrook and Scone.

For a number of years in the 1980s, the passenger services were replaced by road coaches while the line was upgraded. Rail services were restored on 14 March 1988.

It is also served by NSW TrainLink Xplorer services from Sydney to Armidale and Moree.

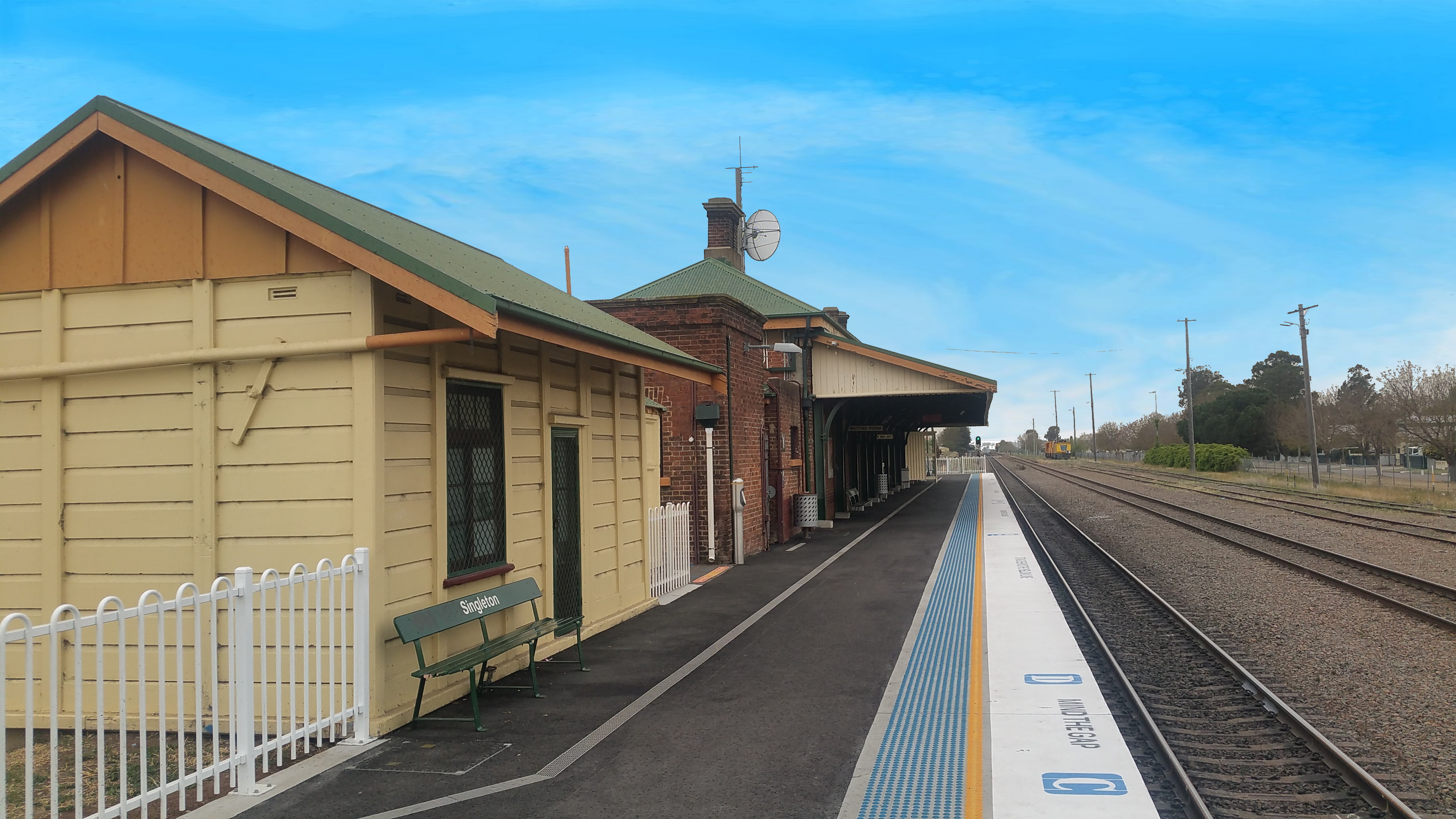
Southbound view on platform

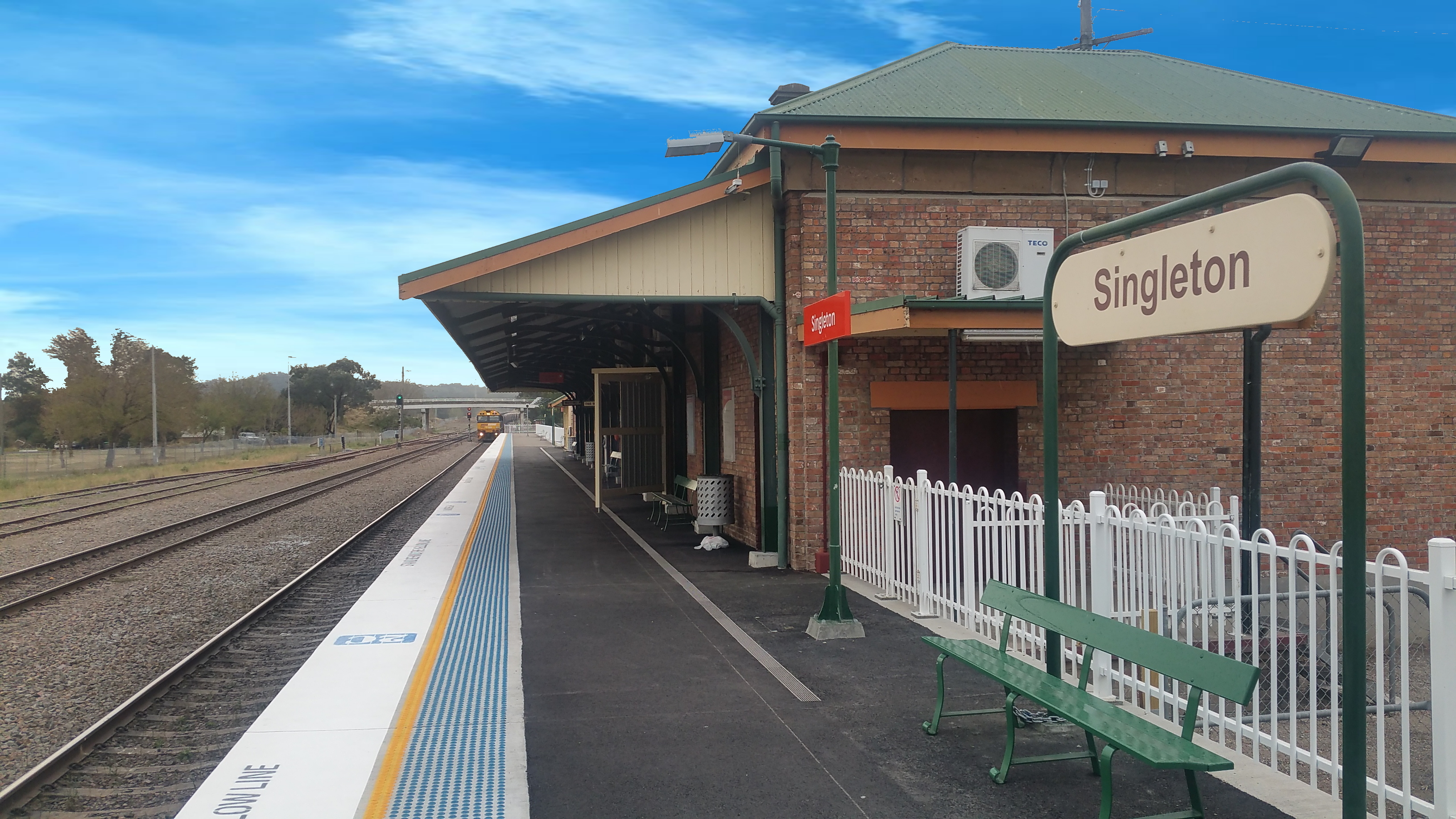
Northbound view on platform

Platform	Line	Stopping pattern	Notes
1	HUN	services to Newcastle, Muswellbrook & Scone; Two terminating services to & from Newcastle	
1	North Western Region	services to Armidale/Moree & Sydney Central	

== Transport links ==
Hunter Valley Buses operates five bus routes via Singleton station, under contract to Transport for NSW:

- 180: Stockland Green Hills to Singleton Heights via Maitland
- 180X: Maitland station express
- 401: Singleton Town Circuit
- 403: to Hunterview
- 404: to Singleton Heights

== Description ==
The station complex consists of the second-class brick station buildings (1863) and pre-cast concrete type K signal box (1926). The platforms are brick, with early use of ramped beds, and pre-cast concrete at the north end. A jib crane also remains within the station precinct.

== Heritage listing ==
Singleton is significant as the oldest surviving station building in the Hunter Valley fronting a major civic square in the town, displaying fine brickwork and detailing. The scale of the building is large in comparison to the buildings of similar period in the area. The awning is a later addition c. 1910. The pre-cast concrete signal box being a late addition is typical of its time and came due to upgrading of signalling.

Singleton railway station was listed on the New South Wales State Heritage Register on 2 April 1999.
