= Hunter Line =

Australian commuter train line

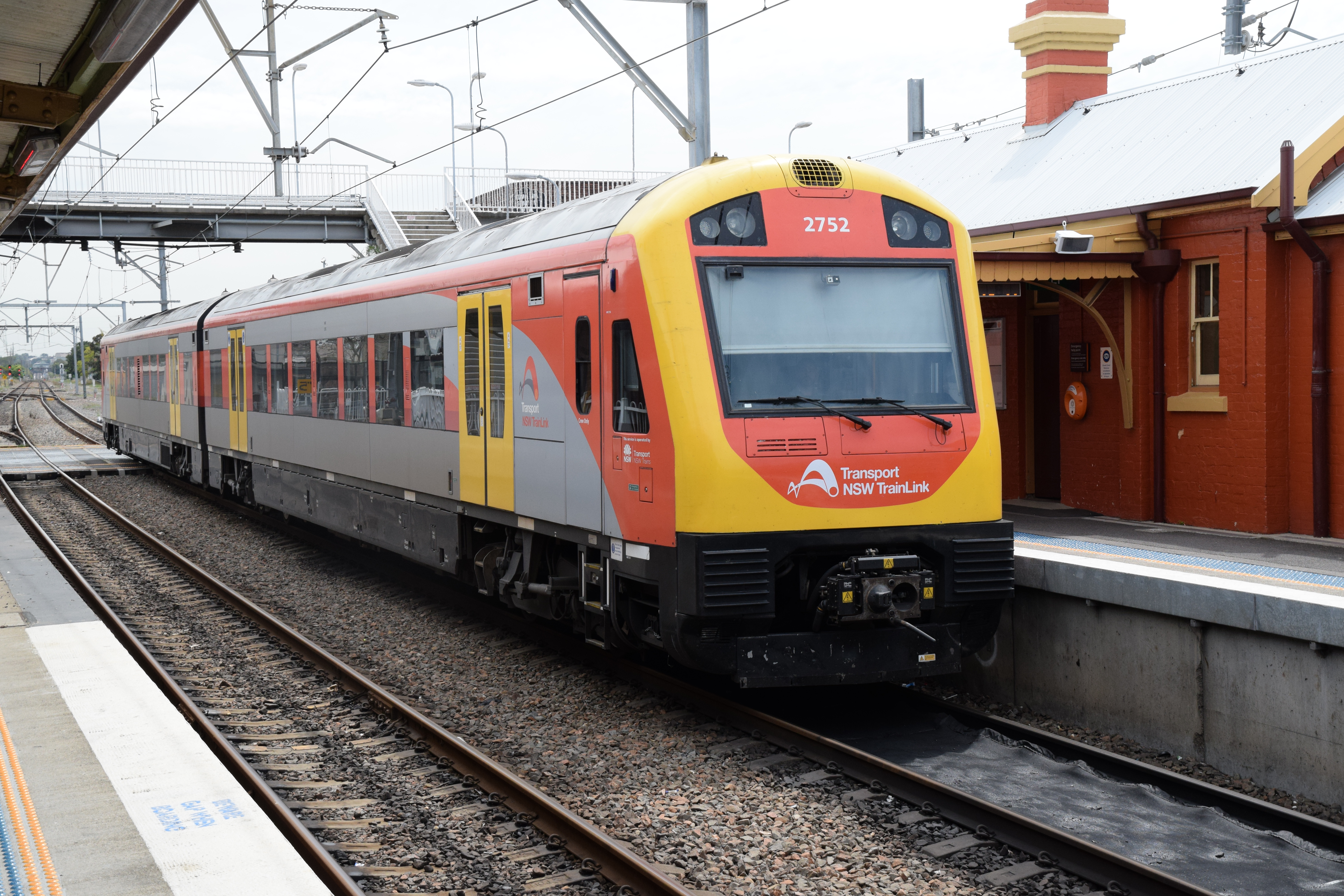
- A Hunter railcar at Hamilton

Overview
- Service type: Commuter rail
- Locale: Hunter Region, New South Wales
- Current operator: Sydney Trains

Route
- Termini: Newcastle Interchange; Dungog; Scone
- Stops: 28
- Lines used: Newcastle; Main North; North Coast

Technical
- Rolling stock: Hunter Railcar; Endeavour Railcar
- Track gauge: 1,435 mm (4 ft 8 1/2 in) standard gauge
- Track owner: Transport Asset Manager of New South Wales
- Timetable number: HUN
Route map
Sydney Trains intercity services
- Blue Mountains
- Central Coast & Newcastle
- Hunter
- South Coast
- Southern Highlands

The Hunter Line (HUN) is a commuter rail service running from Newcastle, with two branches to Dungog and Scone in the Hunter Region of New South Wales, Australia. It operates on the Newcastle, Main North and North Coast lines.

== Description of route ==
Hunter Line services operate from Newcastle on the Newcastle branch line to Islington Junction, the Main North Line between Islington Junction and Scone, the North Coast Line between Maitland and Dungog. The Hunter Line shares its portion of the Main North Line and North Coast Line with NSW TrainLink North Western and North Coast regional services respectively.

The Newcastle line partially closed in 2015 and was replaced with the Newcastle Light Rail through the Newcastle central business district. Hunter line services were truncated to temporarily terminate at Hamilton from 5 January 2015. The new permanent terminus, Newcastle Interchange, opened on 15 October 2017.

== Services ==
Services run regularly between Newcastle and Telarah, with infrequent services to Dungog and Singleton, Muswellbrook and Scone. Services are operated by Endeavour and Hunter railcars, which are both 2-car diesel multiple units.

Until 2007, 620/720 class railcars operated the service. The line was the last in Australia to have a regular steam hauled passenger service. The final service was hauled from Newcastle to Singleton on 24 July 1971 by 3246. Diesel locomotive hauled services operated until replaced by 620/720 and 660/760 class railcars in 1984.

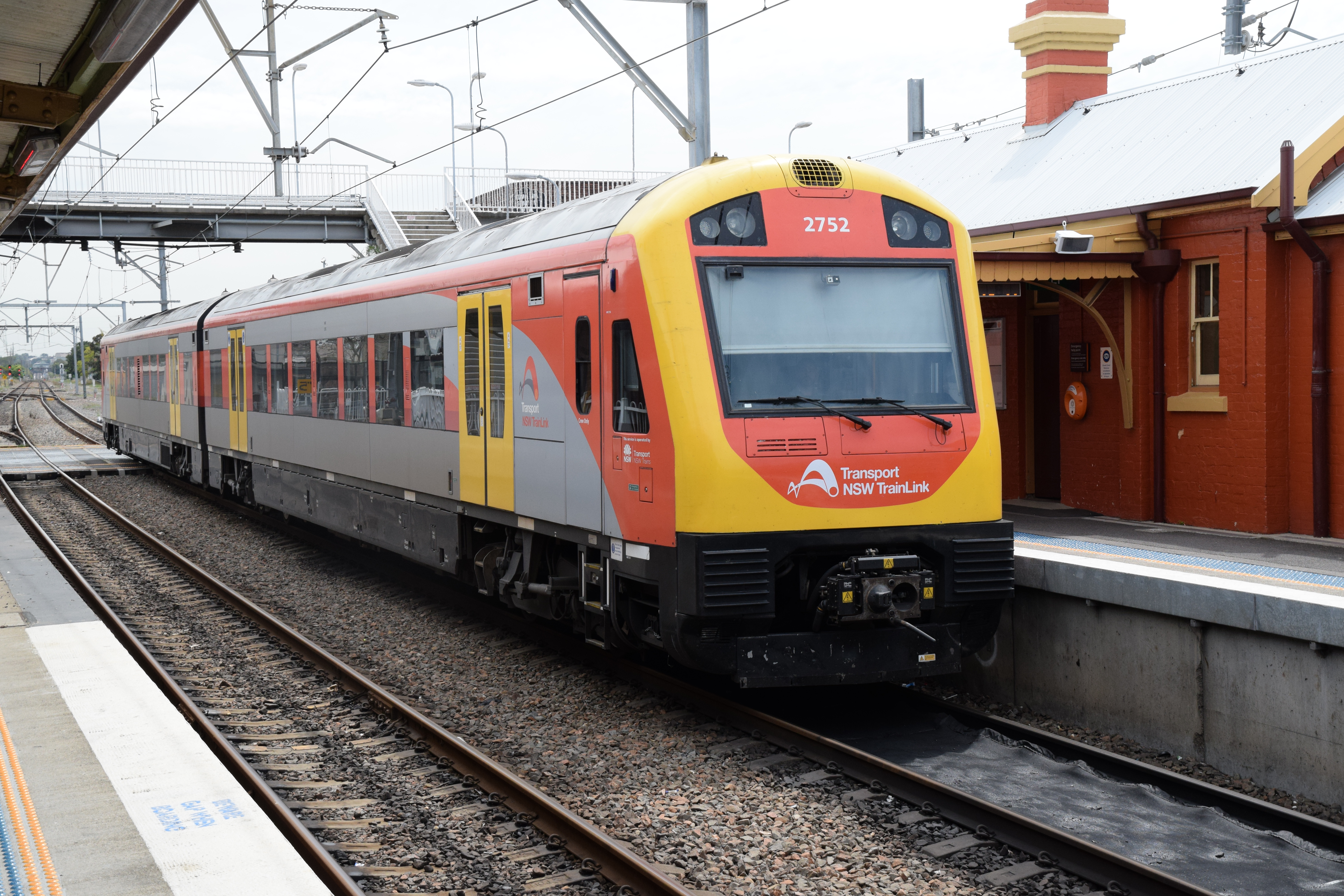
Hunter Railcar

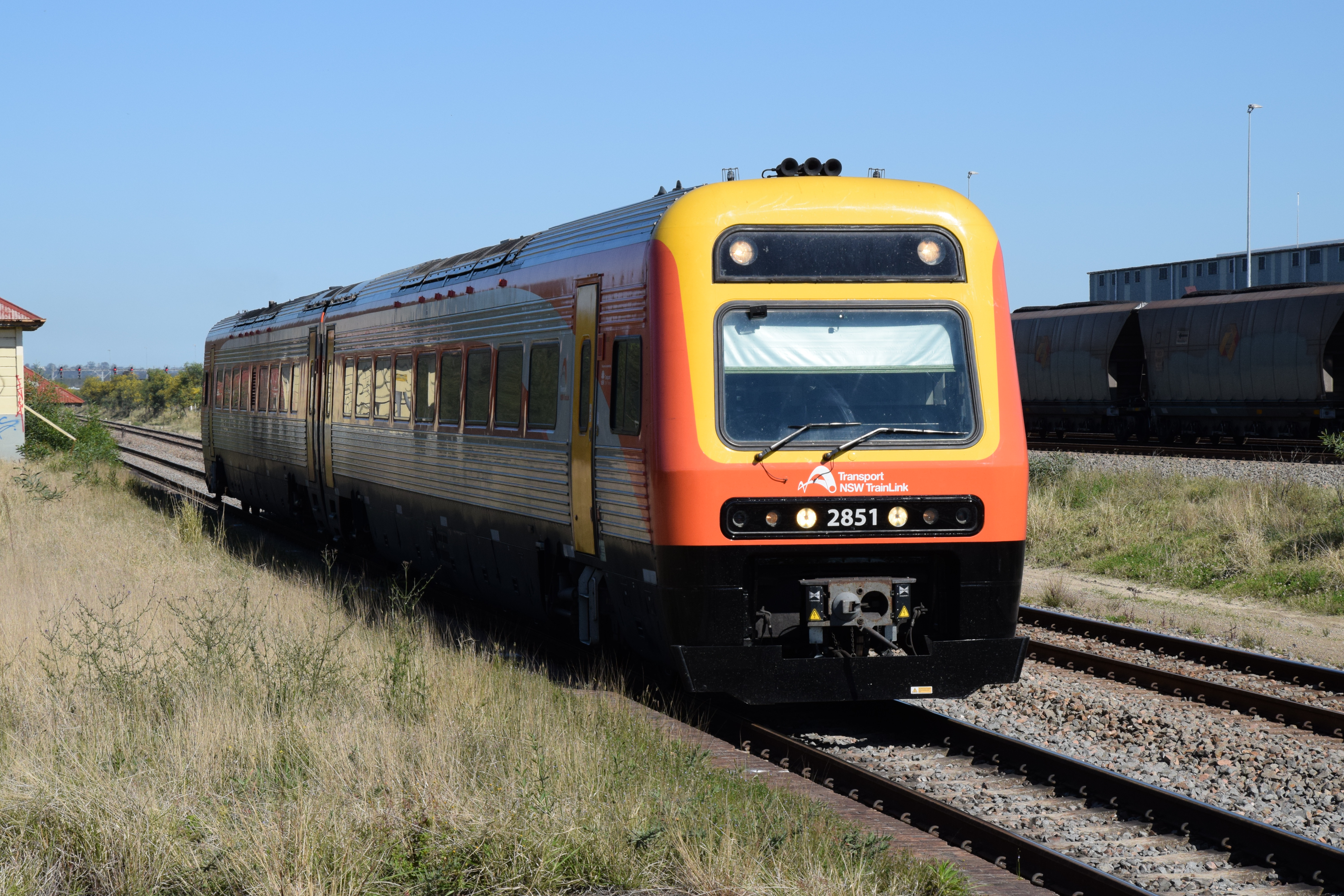
Endeavour Railcar

== Future ==
Cessnock, Maitland and Singleton councils released a series of planning documents in 2026 guiding urban development of the Anambah to Branxton corridor over the next several decades. The transport strategy proposed several changes that would impact the inner section of the Scone branch of the Hunter line. These include two new stations - West Rutherford and Anvil Creek - to be located on either side of Lochinvar, relocating Greta to the south and upgrading Lochinvar and Branxton stations. All stations would be built or lengthened to incorporate 100 metre platforms capable of serving a 4-car train. The strategy proposed delivering the Lochinvar and Branxton upgrades between 2036 and 2046, and the new and relocated stations after 2046.

Services on this section of the line would be enhanced. The strategy proposed reducing the number of paths reserved for coal trains from 120 to 60 by 2051, as coal traffic is expected to decline. Passenger train paths would increase from 6 to 45 by 2051, delivering 3 trains per hour in peak periods and 2 trains per hour off-peak.

== Patronage ==
The following table shows the patronage of each line of the NSW TrainLink Intercity network for the year ending 30 June 2026, based on Opal tap on and tap off data.

2025–26 NSW TrainLink Intercity patronage by line
Blue Mountains Line	6,634,999
Central Coast & Newcastle Line	12,765,284
Hunter Line	839,041
South Coast Line	7,445,930
Southern Highlands Line	553,390
