= Muswellbrook railway station =

Railway station in New South Wales, Australia

Muswellbrook
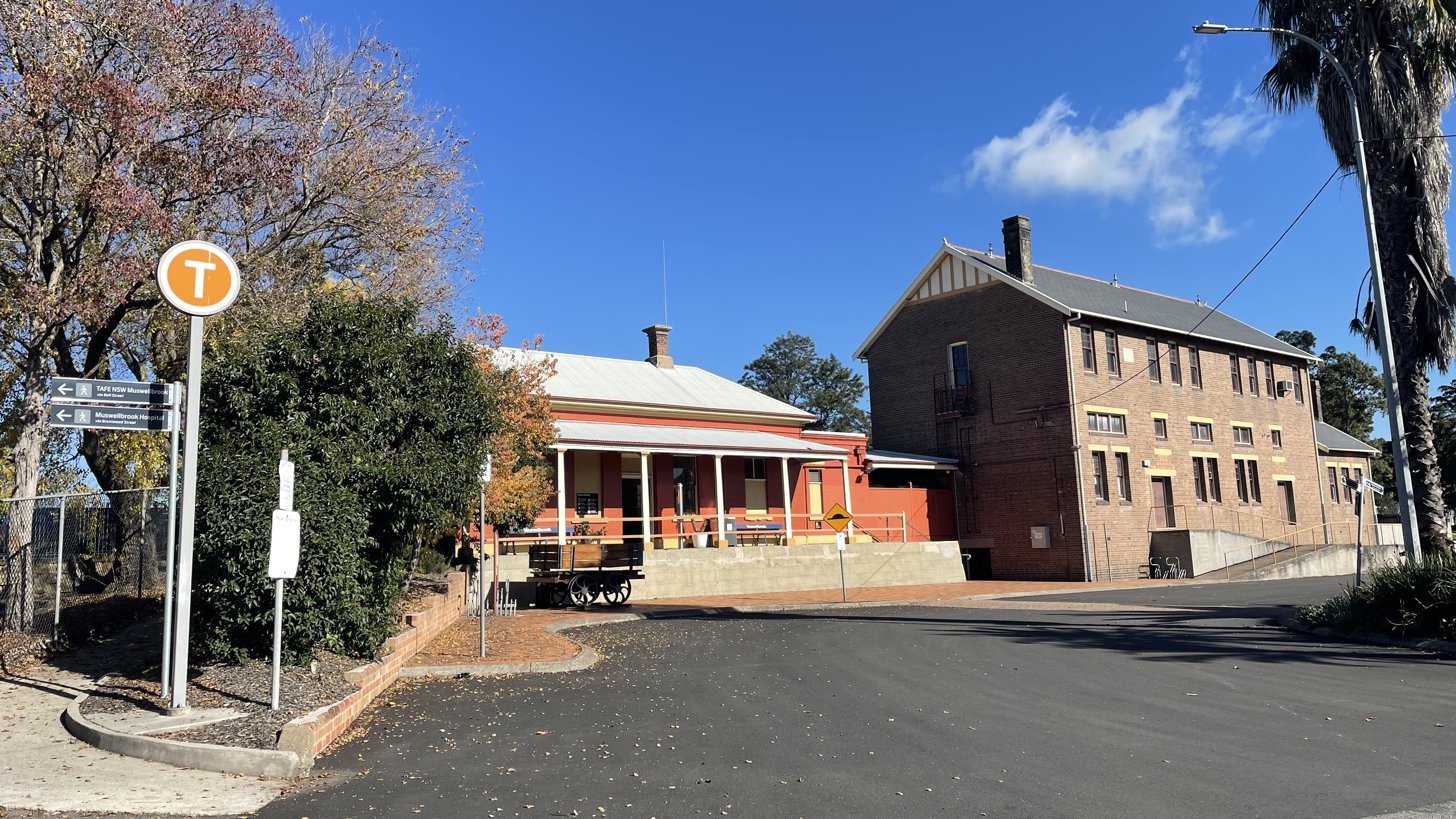
- Station buildings in June 2024

General information
- Location: Market Street, Muswellbrook; Australia
- Coordinates: 32°16′03″S 150°53′25″E
- Owner: Transport Asset Manager of New South Wales
- Operator: Sydney Trains
- Line: Main Northern
- Distance: 288.78 km (179.44 mi) from Central
- Platforms: 1
- Tracks: 5

Construction
- Structure type: Ground
- Accessible: Yes

Other information
- Status: Weekdays: Staffed: 5.45am–5.45pm: Weekends and public holidays: Unstaffed
- Station code: MBK
- Website: Transport for NSW

History
- Opened: 19 May 1869
- Former names: Musclebrook (1869–1890)

Passengers
- 2025: 12,054 (year); 33 (daily) (Sydney Trains, NSW TrainLink)

Services
Preceding station	Intercity Trains	Following station
Aberdeen towards Scone	Hunter Line	Singleton towards Newcastle Interchange
Preceding station	NSW TrainLink	Following station
Aberdeen towards Moree or Armidale	NSW TrainLink North Western Line	Singleton towards Sydney
Former services
Preceding station	Former services	Following station
Aberdeen towards Wallangarra	Main Northern Line (1877–1975)	Grasstree towards Sydney

New South Wales Heritage Register
- Official name: Muswellbrook Railway Station and yard group; Musclebrook Railway Station
- Type: State heritage (complex / group)
- Designated: 2 April 1999
- Reference no.: 1208
- Type: Railway Platform / Station
- Category: Transport – Rail
Location

Muswellbrook railway station is a heritage-listed railway station located on the Main Northern line in Muswellbrook, New South Wales, Australia. The station serves the town of Muswellbrook and was designed by John Whitton, the Chief Engineer of NSW Railways. It is also known as Muswellbrook Railway Station and yard group and Musclebrook Railway Station. The property was added to the New South Wales State Heritage Register on 2 April 1999.

== History ==
The single railway line from Singleton to, and station of Musclebrook was completed and opened on 19 May 1869, by the Earl of Belmore, Governor of NSW. Construction for the Muswellbrook section was awarded to George Blunt on 2 September 1864. The station was renamed Muswellbrook on 1 September 1890.

The line (formerly known as the Great Northern Railway) runs through the Central Coast, Hunter and New England regions. It was the original main line between Sydney and Brisbane, however this required a change of gauge at Wallangarra. The line is now closed north of Armidale, and the main Brisbane-Sydney route is now the North Coast line.

The original 1869 John Whitton brick station building remains. The 1869 station building is one of several notable early stations attributed to Whitton during his long career with NSW Railways. It borrows heavily from his design experience in England and the influence of Georgian and Victorian architectural styles. Internally it comprised a Station Master's office, ticket office, waiting room, ladies room and lavatories.

Major changes and alterations included installation of a turntable in 1869 and its replacement by a larger one in 1890, lengthening of the platform and provision of an ash pit in 1891.

It was not until 1890 that the Railways Department changed the station name to Muswellbrook. A gatehouse was built at the level crossing in 1892. In 1898 and 1911 the platform was extended and in 1909 a station master's residence was approved for 545 pounds.

Muswellbrook railway precinct was expanded in the early 20th century with addition of the much larger two storey brick railway refreshment rooms immediately adjacent to the station building.

The refreshment rooms were commissioned in 1922, opened the same year. At the time, the Singleton Argus reported:

The new refreshment rooms at the Muswellbrook railway station were opened on Monday on the arrival of the passenger train from Tamworth. Miss Lawson, who acted as manageress at Glen Innes for seven years and fiveyears in a similar capacity at Singleton, is in charge of the rooms. The staff consists of 10 hands, four of whom were local appointments. Most of the food required will be brought from Sydney. The ground floor comprises: Dining saloon 30 feet wide and 50 feet long, and a bar 30 feet by 14 feet. At the northern end of the building on the ground floor are the cooking quarters, consisting of kitchen, scullery, pantry, storeroom, washhouse. On the top floor are eight rooms, bath room and linen press for use of the staff.

— Singleton Argus. 19 October 1922.

In 1927 the Refreshment Rooms were extended, altered to include five bedrooms for the public. This building replaced the rest houses, which had been transferred from Murrurundi and Singleton and re-erected at Muswellbrook in 1918.

The subway underpass was constructed in 1928 as a replacement for the level crossing at the Sydney end of the station. An overbridge was built on Bridge Street, replacing the level crossing. Meanwhile, a locomotive depot had been built in 1943.

In 1977 a coal mine at Ulan was opened and the railway was extended from Sandy Hollow to Ulan in 1982 to transport coal to Newcastle, via Muswellbrook.

For a number of years in the 1980s, the passenger services were replaced by road coaches while the line was upgraded. Rail services were restored on 14 March 1988.

In 2007 approval was given for 2-staged refurbishment of the railway refreshment room as a museum; provision of stair & entry ramp and install lift, then for construction of a stand-alone visitor information centre, storeroom, toilets, deck & landscaping.

In 2011 approval was given to demolish the disused signal box.

Muswellbrook formerly had an extensive freight yard including a locomotive roundhouse. The Merriwa section of the Ulan line branches off the Main Northern line at the northern end of the yard.

In early 2007, the Australian Rail Track Corporation commenced work to rationalise the tracks within the yard and add a passing loop long enough to accommodate 1,500-metre (4,900 ft) long trains. Upon completion, freight trains are to pass through the yard area at 80 kilometres per hour (50 mph), improving travel times.

In March 2009, duplication of the Main Northern line reached Muswellbrook station, the completion of a project to upgrade the line to double track between Antiene and Muswellbrook to improve coal haulage capacity.

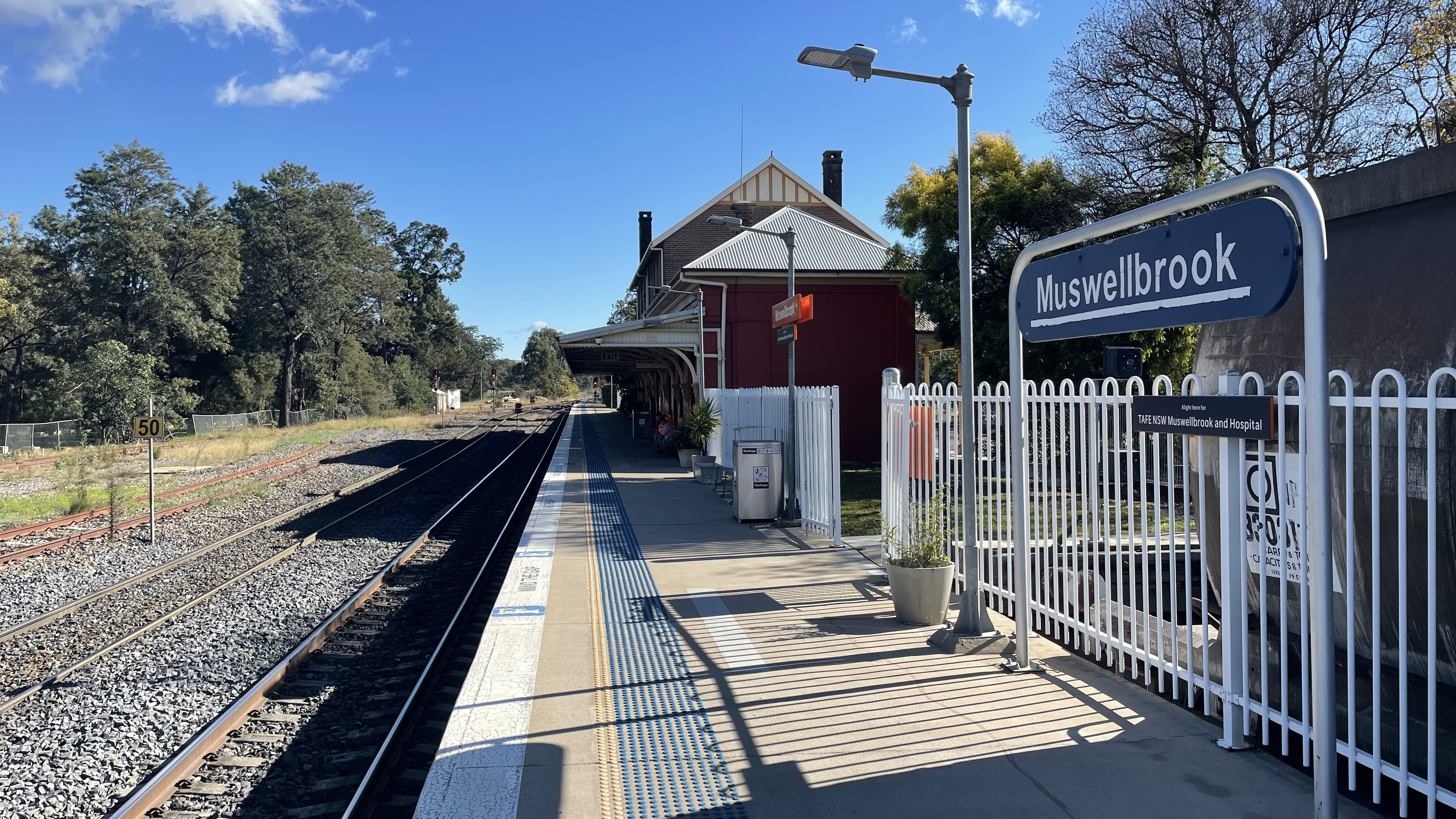
Northbound view on the platform

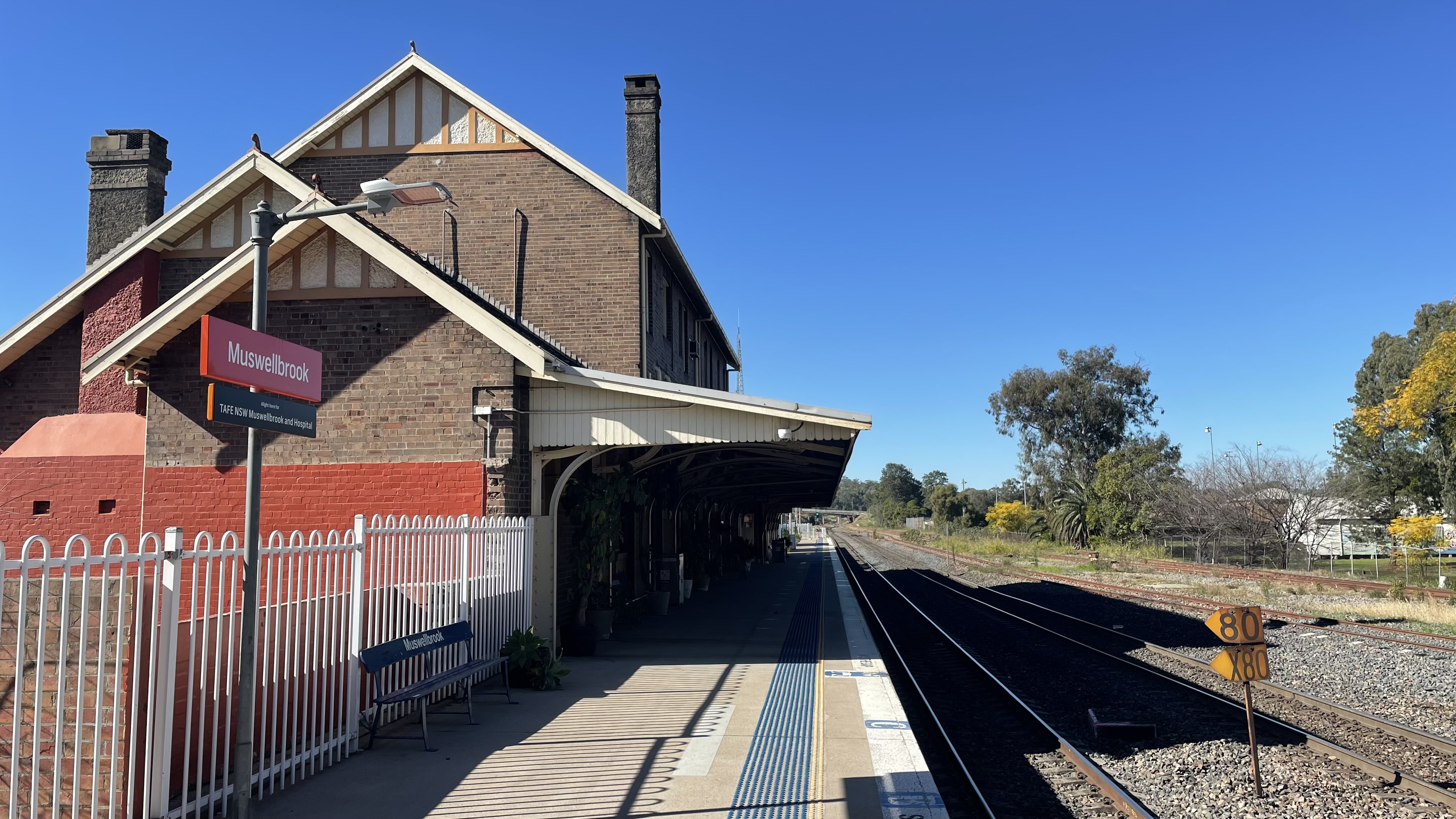
Southbound view on the platform

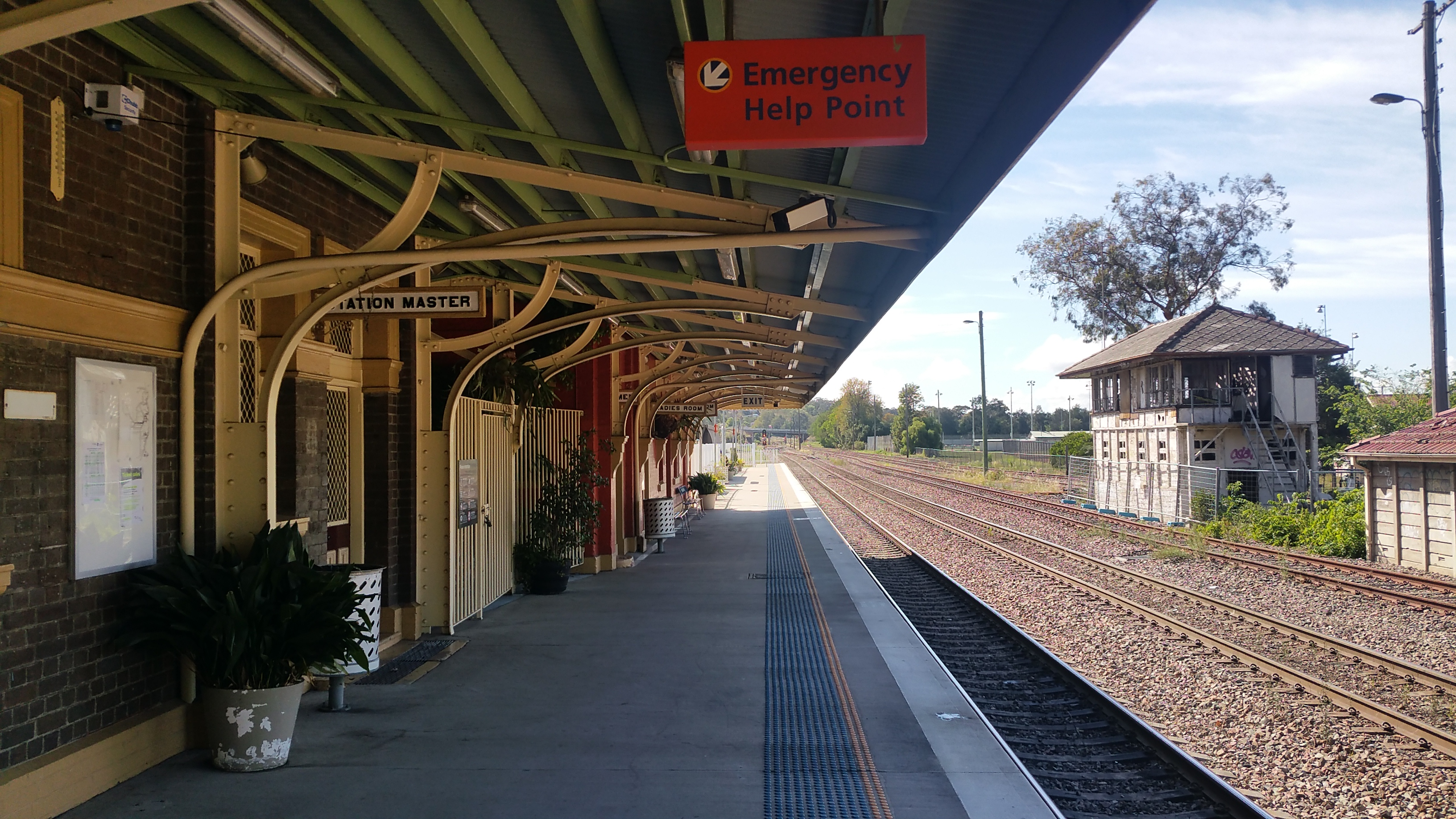
Platform covered area, looking south

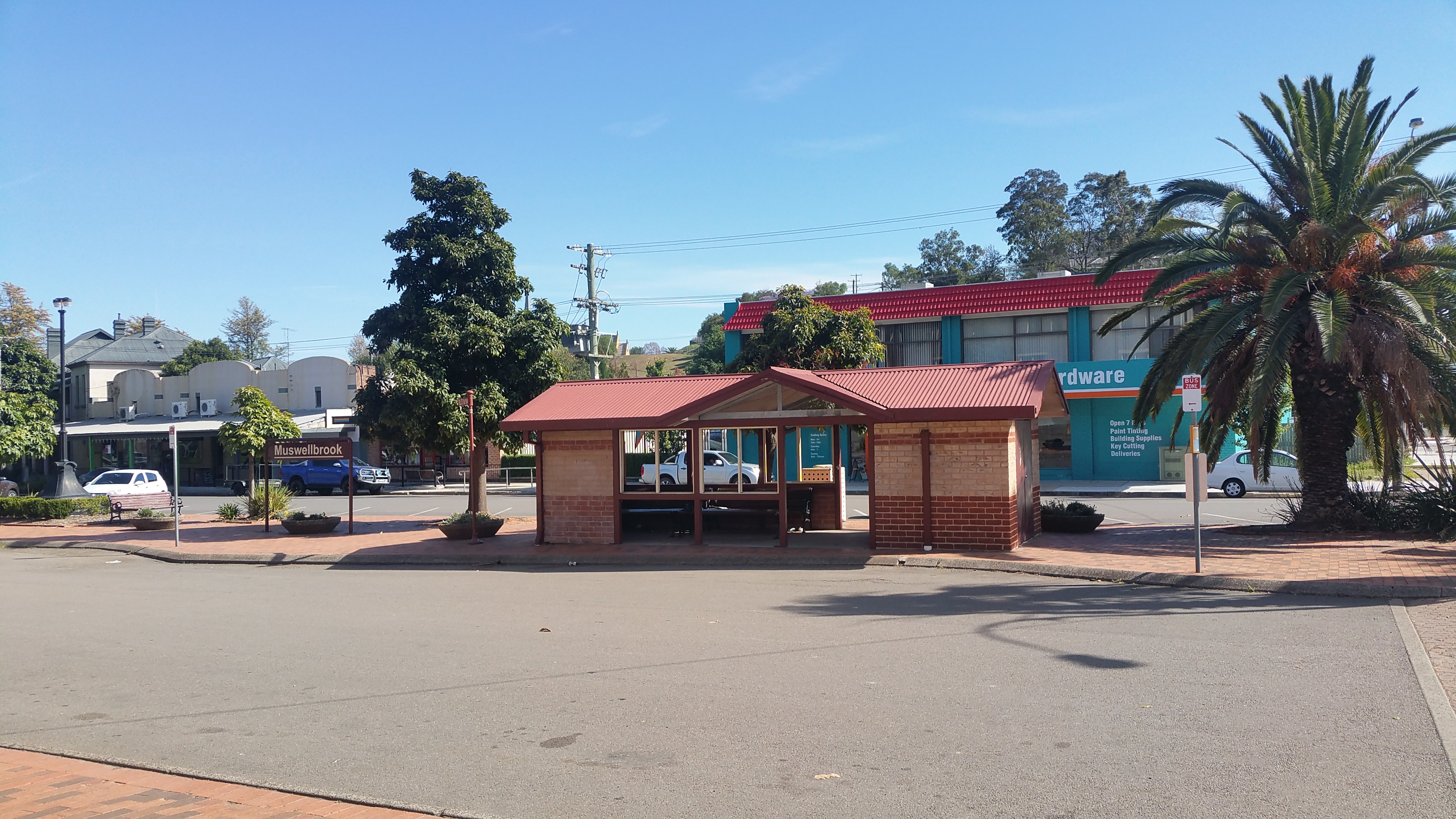
Bus stop outside station

== Platforms and services ==
The station has one platform and a disused dock platform at the southern end. Muswellbrook is serviced by Sydney Trains Hunter Line services travelling between Newcastle and Scone.

It is also served by NSW TrainLink Xplorer services from Sydney to Armidale and Moree.

Platform	Line	Stopping pattern	Notes
1	HUN	services to Newcastle & Scone; One early weekday morning terminating service to & from Newcastle	
1	North Western Region	services to Armidale/Moree & Sydney Central	

== Description ==
The station complex comprises a type 3, second class brick station building, completed in 1869. The original station building was a small well proportioned brick structure with simple stone lintels and hipped roof. It is a rendered brick building with a hipped roof of corrugated, galvanised iron (originally slate). The building is elevated above street level. Its entrance is via steps leading to a stone flagged verandah with a hipped roof of corrugated galvanised iron, supported by timber posts. The verandah roof to the street is original. The doors are timber with moulded panels and window frames are timber, double-hung sash type.

The platform awning is an extension of the awning built at the time of construction of the adjacent refreshment room building. It is a cast iron, cantilevered awning of corrugated, galvanised iron.

The internal layout has changed since originally constructed, consisting today of a store room, waiting room, female toilets and male toilets.

The refreshment rooms, were completed in 1921–22, with additions c. 1927–28. This two storey building is located immediately adjacent to the station building. Two hipped roofs clad in diamond pattern slate tiles with terracotta ridge capping and ram's head finials. The ground floor projects outward from under the first floor, so that a portion has its own roof. The roofs are finished with timber barge boards and painted rough-cast infill. The chimneys are also rough-cast cement. Tuck-pointed brickwork, timber moulded panel doors, some with transom windows, timber double-hung sash windows bordered with stone lintels and ornate, rendered sills and pressed metal cornices.

The layout consists of refreshment rooms and kitchens on the ground floor with passenger accommodation on the upper floor, with associated bathrooms and linen stores. Internally the building features pressed metal cornices and ceilings, hardwood floors, a pine staircase and balustrade.

The type 4 elevated signal box with a hip roof was completed in 1923. It is an elevated, two storey signal box on a timber frame, with pre-cast concrete and asbestos cement cladding. Lower floor comprises a drop-in, pre-cast concrete panel between concrete uprights and conventional timber-framed construction on the upper floor. A hipped roof with broad overhanging eaves, clad in fibro asbestos laid in a diamond pattern and terracotta ridge capping. Window frames are timber, double-hung sash with between 6 and 9 panes. Access is va a steel ladder and there is a toilet on the upper landing.

Other structures include a brick-faced platform, completed in 1869; a carriage dock, also completed in 1869, that was used for parcel and mail vans; and the remains of a locomotive depot, completed in 1943, including a turntable, a T145 jib crane, located within a shed, erected in 1869; and a timber loading bank.

=== Modifications and dates ===
Changes of level of the rear of both station and refreshment room buildings have occurred after construction, as follows:

- 1865 – station building, platform, carriage dock, crane.
- Early 20th century – extension of station building to Sydney end, adding Station Master's room (back-to-back fireplace with existing (formerly external) fireplace in what is now a store room, was a parcel room). Extension had windows to the street, a fireplace and no door to the station platform (as per 1917, 1918 plans). This extension is gone now (2016).
- c. 1910 – post card photo shows two chimneys at each ends of the hipped roof, including this one at the "Sydney end". The 1917 plans show "proposed station buildings" including refreshment rooms that were never built, or never built in the configuration on the plans. A 1980 photo shows no chimney protruding from the Sydney end roof hip/ridge. This suggests the configuration of these chimneys is not original and probably dates to the mid 20th century.
- 1921–22 – Refreshment Rooms added beside station building.
- 1927–28 – addition/extension/modification of refreshment room building.
- 1923 – Signal box added.
- 1943 – Locomotive depot, including turntable, crane and jib.

=== Further information ===
The heritage site does not include the former locomotive depot or its turntable.

== Heritage listing ==
The station group represents an excellent example of an early complex surviving in its basic form and adapted with the addition of other structures as passengers increased. The first station building can be clearly seen with its rare example of an early street verandah and most of its detailing intact. The refreshment room is a good example of a type of building that thrived and are no longer in use. They are significant community buildings in the townscape, dominating the skyline with the bulk of the refreshment rooms. The signal box adds significance to the group and is itself a good example of a later elevated signal box.

The Muswellbrook railway station was listed on the New South Wales State Heritage Register on 2 April 1999 having satisfied the following criteria.

The place possesses uncommon, rare or endangered aspects of the cultural or natural history of New South Wales.

This item is assessed as historically rare. This item is assessed as scientifically rare. This item is assessed as architecturally rare. This item is assessed as socially rare.
