= Metford railway station =

Railway station in New South Wales, Australia

Metford
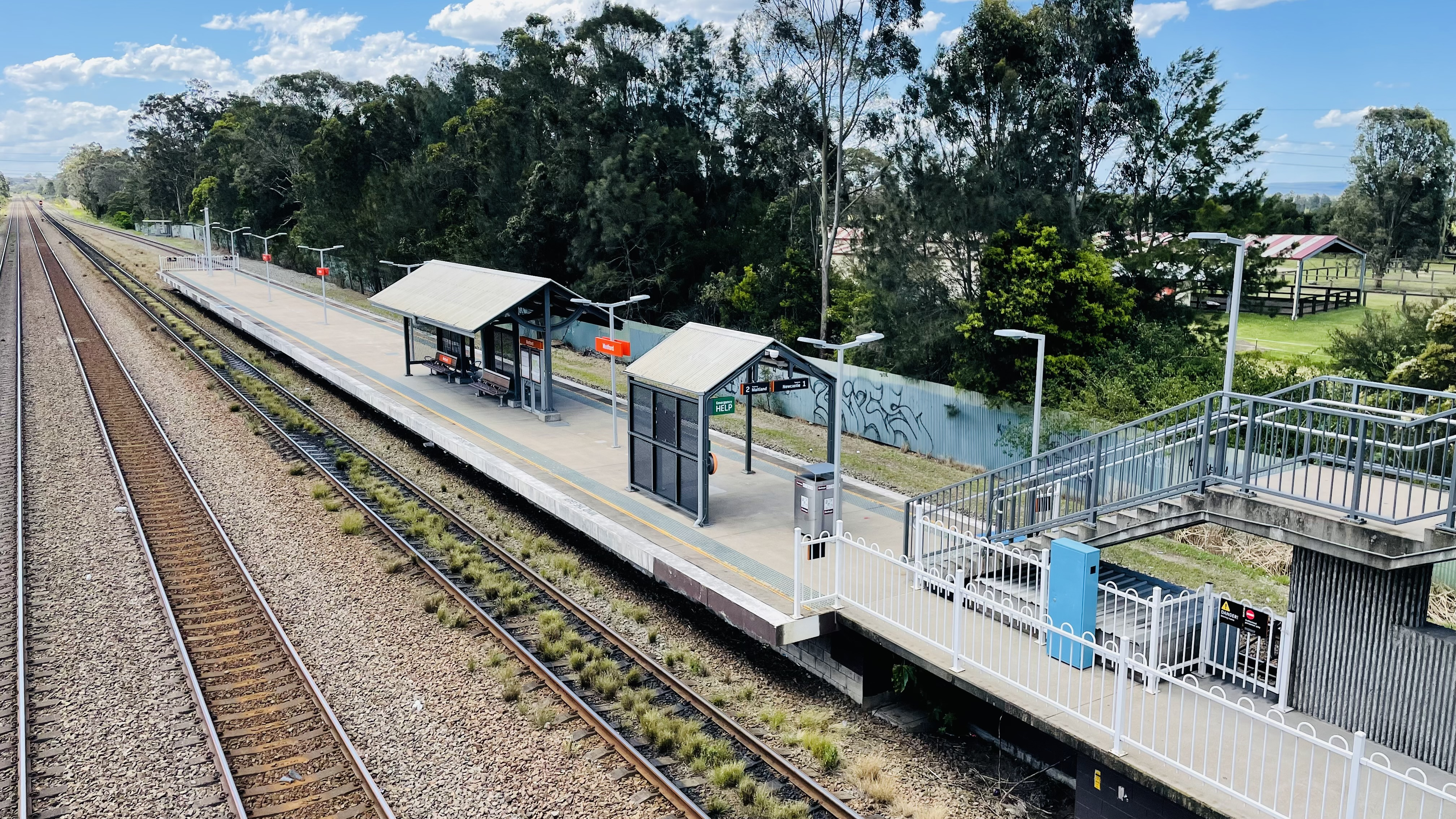
- Westbound view of the station platforms, November 2022

General information
- Location: McCubbin Close, Metford; Australia
- Coordinates: 32°45′54″S 151°37′04″E
- Owner: Transport Asset Manager of New South Wales
- Operator: Sydney Trains
- Line: Main Northern
- Distance: 185.12 kilometres (115.03 mi) from Central
- Platforms: 2 (1 island)
- Tracks: 4
- Connections: Bus

Construction
- Structure type: Ground
- Accessible: Yes

Other information
- Website: Transport for NSW

History
- Opened: 17 March 1995; 31 years ago

Passengers
- 2025: 33,396 (year); 91 (daily) (Sydney Trains, NSW TrainLink)

Services
Preceding station	Intercity Trains	Following station
Victoria Street towards Dungog or Scone	Hunter Line	Thornton towards Newcastle Interchange
Location

Metford railway station is located on the Main Northern line in New South Wales, Australia. It serves Metford in the eastern suburbs of Maitland, opening on 17 March 1995.

== Platforms and services ==
Metford has one island platform with two faces. It is serviced by Sydney Trains Intercity Hunter Line services travelling from Newcastle to Maitland, Singleton, Muswellbrook, Scone, Telarah and Dungog.

Platform	Line	Stopping pattern	Notes
1	HUN	services to Newcastle	
2	HUN	services to Maitland, Telarah, Dungog, Singleton, Muswellbrook & Scone	

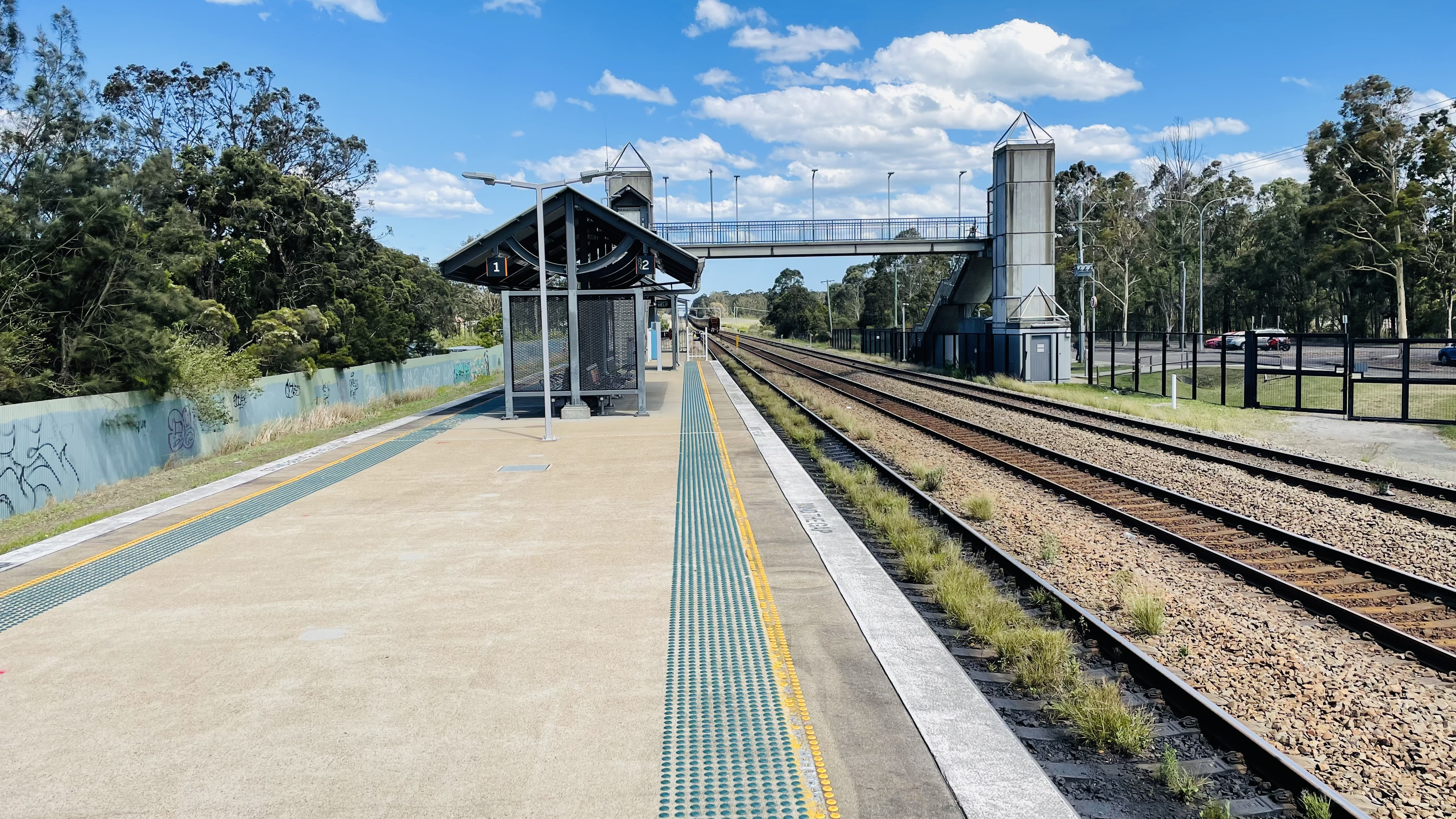
Eastbound view from island platform

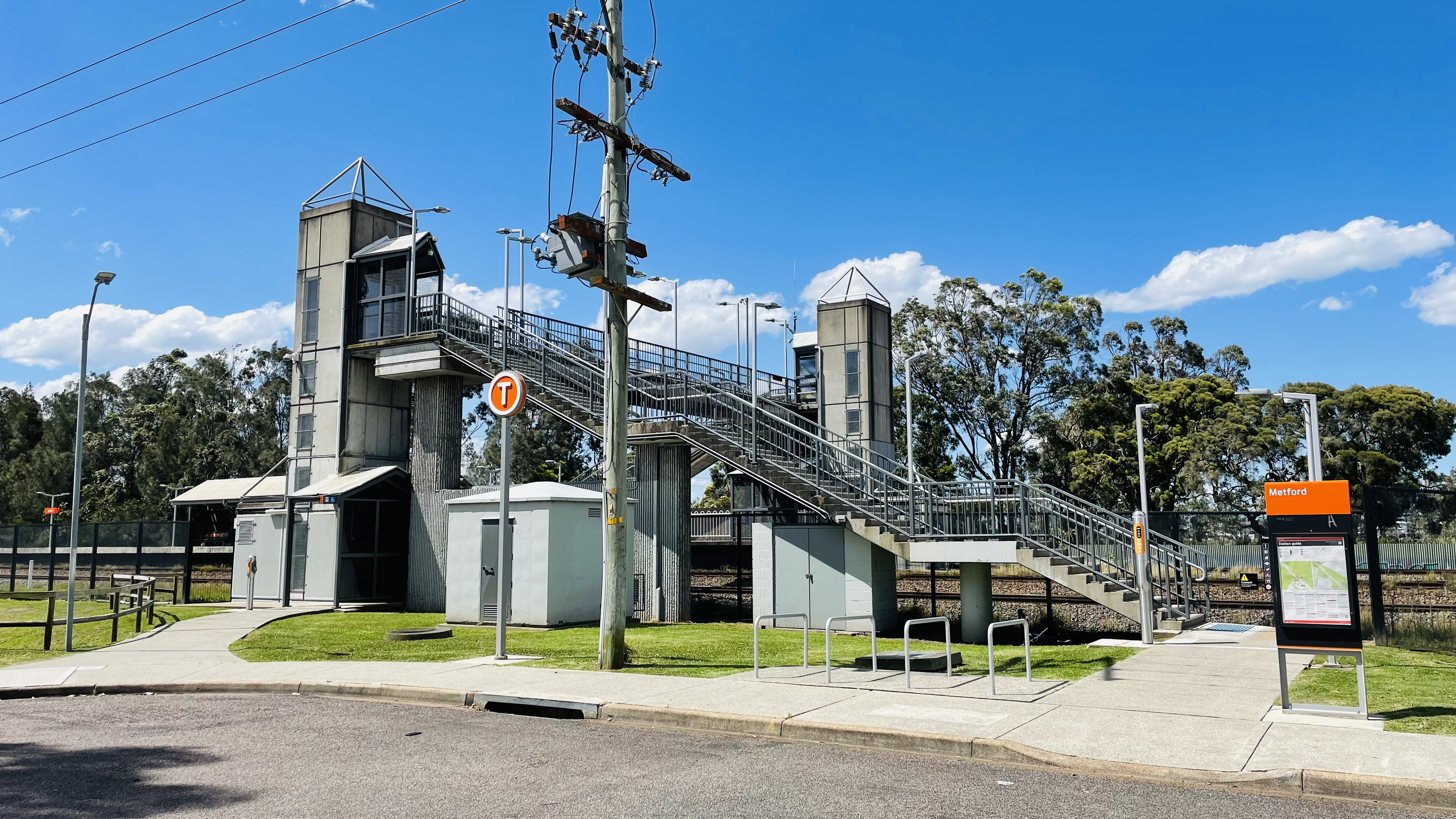
Entrance on McCubbin Close

== Transport links ==
Hunter Valley Buses operates one bus route via Metford station, under contract to Transport for NSW:

- 181: Woodberry to Rutherford
