= Victoria Street railway station, New South Wales =

Railway station in New South Wales, Australia

Victoria Street
- Platforms looking Eastbound, July 2026

General information
- Location: Victoria Street, East Maitland; Australia
- Coordinates: 32°45′03″S 151°35′37″E
- Owner: Transport Asset Manager of New South Wales
- Operator: Sydney Trains
- Line: Main Northern
- Distance: 187.92 km (116.77 mi) from Central
- Platforms: 2 (1 island)
- Tracks: 4 (2 passenger, 2 coal)
- Connections: Bus

Construction
- Structure type: Ground
- Accessible: Yes

Other information
- Station code: VST
- Website: Transport for NSW

History
- Opened: 5 April 1857; 169 years ago

Passengers
- 2025: 147,964 (year); 405 (daily) (Sydney Trains, NSW TrainLink)

Services
Preceding station	Intercity Trains	Following station
East Maitland towards Telarah or Scone	Hunter Line	Metford towards Newcastle Interchange
Maitland towards Dungog or Scone	Hunter Line	Metford towards Newcastle Interchange
Location
- Location within New South Wales

Victoria Street railway station is a heritage-listed railway station located on the Main Northern line in New South Wales, Australia. It serves the Victoria Street area of East Maitland. It was added to the New South Wales State Heritage Register on 2 April 1999.

== History ==
It opened on 5 April 1857.

It is in about the same location as the first East Maitland station and marked the temporary terminus of the railway from Newcastle while the bridge over Wallis Creek was built. From 1906 to 1926, it was also an interchange station with the steam tramway line from West to East Maitland.

The building was built in 1877, and in 1914, the single platform was converted to an island platform and a footbridge was added when the line was duplicated. The station footbridge was added along with the island conversion in 1914.

From 2017 to 2018, under the Transport Access Program, Victoria Street Station received three new lifts, new canopies and signage, bike racks and improvements to the interchange areas.

== Platforms and services ==
Victoria Street has one island platform with two faces. It is serviced by Sydney Trains Hunter Line services travelling from Newcastle to Maitland, Singleton, Muswellbrook, Scone, Telarah and Dungog.

Platform	Line	Stopping pattern	Notes
1	HUN	services to Newcastle	
2	HUN	services to Maitland, Telarah, Dungog, Singleton, Muswellbrook & Scone	

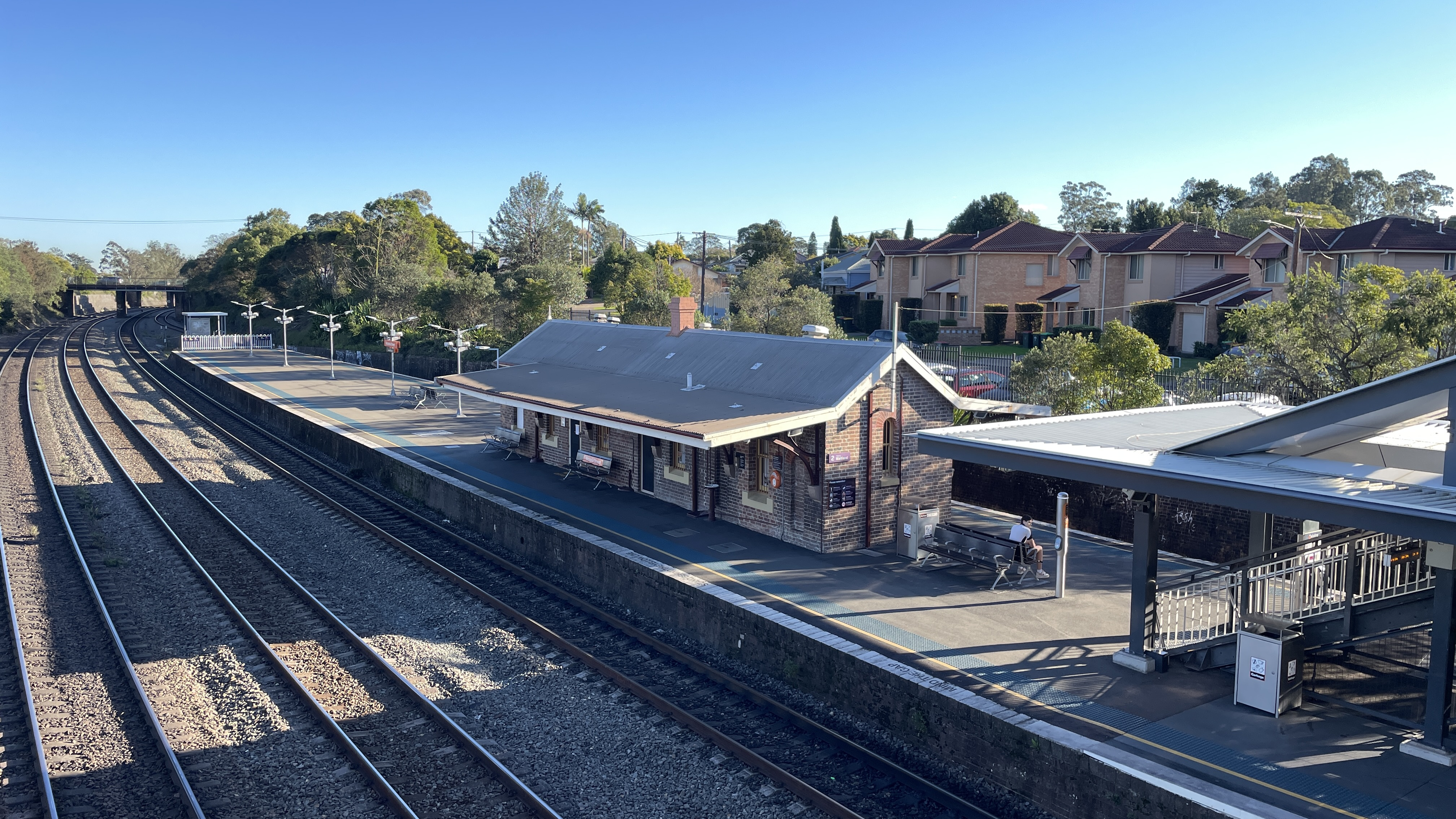
Westbound view of platforms

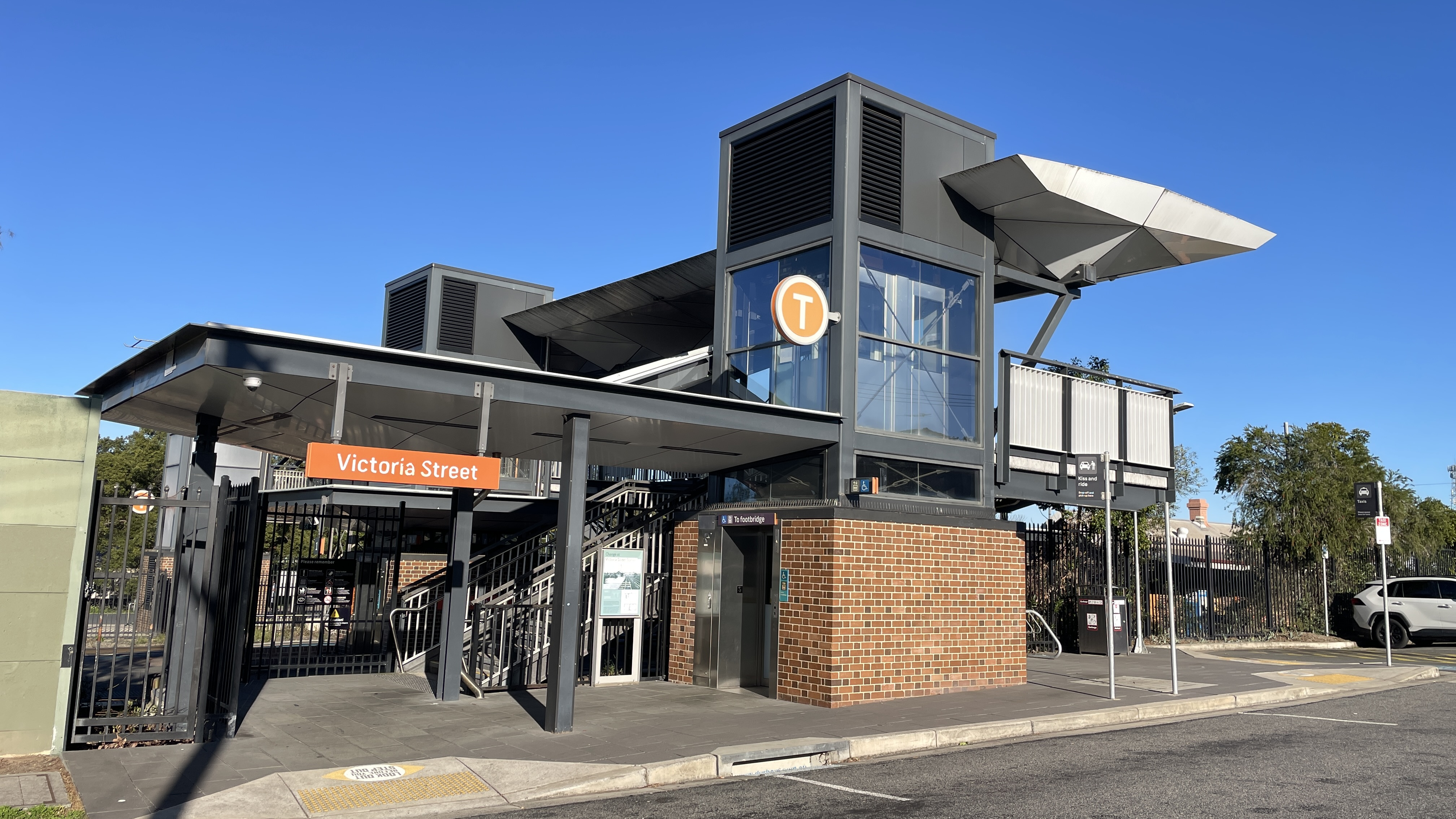
Entrance from Waller Street

== Transport links ==
Hunter Valley Buses operates five bus routes via Victoria Street station, under contract to Transport for NSW:

- 181: Woodberry to Rutherford
- 182: Rutherford to Thornton
- 183: Regiment Road to Tenambit
- 184: Maitland to Chambers Street
- 188: Stockland Green Hills to Woodlands Estate

== Heritage listing ==
Victoria Street station is one of the oldest buildings surviving in the Newcastle area. The site was the line's terminus from Newcastle when it was opened in 1857 until extension to the present Maitland railway station one year later. It has been adapted to an island platform form for duplication, where most of the stations on the line were rebuilt. It is highly significant because of its age and as a remnant of the early line. The footbridge supports the group.

Victoria Street railway station was listed on the New South Wales State Heritage Register on 2 April 1999, satisfying the following criteria.

The place possesses uncommon, rare or endangered aspects of the cultural or natural history of New South Wales.

This item is assessed as historically rare. This item is assessed as scientifically rare. This item is assessed as arch. rare. This item is assessed as socially rare.
