= High Street railway station, New South Wales =

Railway station in New South Wales, Australia

High Street
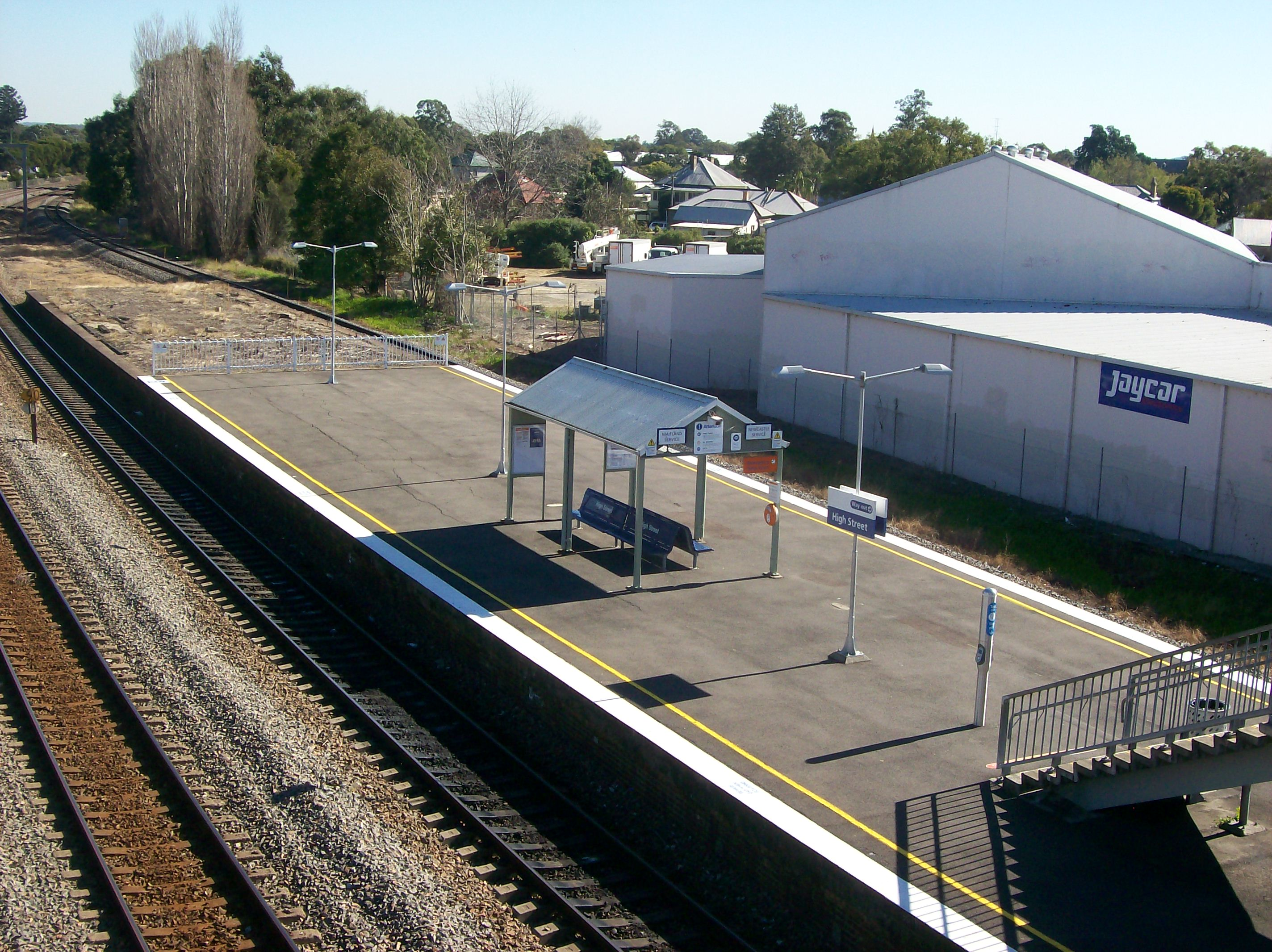
- Westbound view of the station platforms, July 2014

General information
- Location: High Street, Maitland; Australia
- Coordinates: 32°44′29″S 151°33′50″E
- Owner: Transport Asset Manager of New South Wales
- Operator: Sydney Trains
- Line: Main Northern
- Distance: 191.41 kilometres (118.94 mi) from Central
- Platforms: 2 (1 island)
- Tracks: 4
- Connections: Bus

Construction
- Structure type: Ground

Other information
- Station code: HGH
- Website: Transport for NSW

History
- Opened: 27 May 1856; 170 years ago

Passengers
- 2025: 8,378 (year); 23 (daily) (Sydney Trains, NSW TrainLink)

Services
| Preceding station | Intercity Trains | Following station |
|---|---|---|
| Maitland towards Telarah or Scone | Hunter Line | East Maitland towards Newcastle Interchange |
Location

High Street railway station is located on the Main Northern line in New South Wales, Australia. It serves the High Street area of Maitland opening on 27 May 1856.

High Street formerly had a wooden structure on the footbridge, however this was destroyed by fire in 1987 and replaced with a waiting shelter on the platform. Only the eastern half of the platform remains in use, with the western part fenced off.

== Platforms and services ==
High Street has one island platform with two faces. It is serviced by Sydney Trains Hunter Line services travelling between Newcastle, Maitland and Telarah. It is also serviced by one early morning service to Scone.

| Platform | Line | Stopping pattern | Notes |
| 1 | HUN | services to Newcastle | |
| 2 | HUN | services to Maitland & Telarah | 1 early morning service to Scone |

== Transport links ==
Hunter Valley Buses operates two bus routes via High Street station, under contract to Transport for NSW:

- 181: Woodbury to Rutherford
- 183: Regiment Road to Tenambit
