= Hamilton railway station, New South Wales =

Railway station in New South Wales, Australia

Hamilton
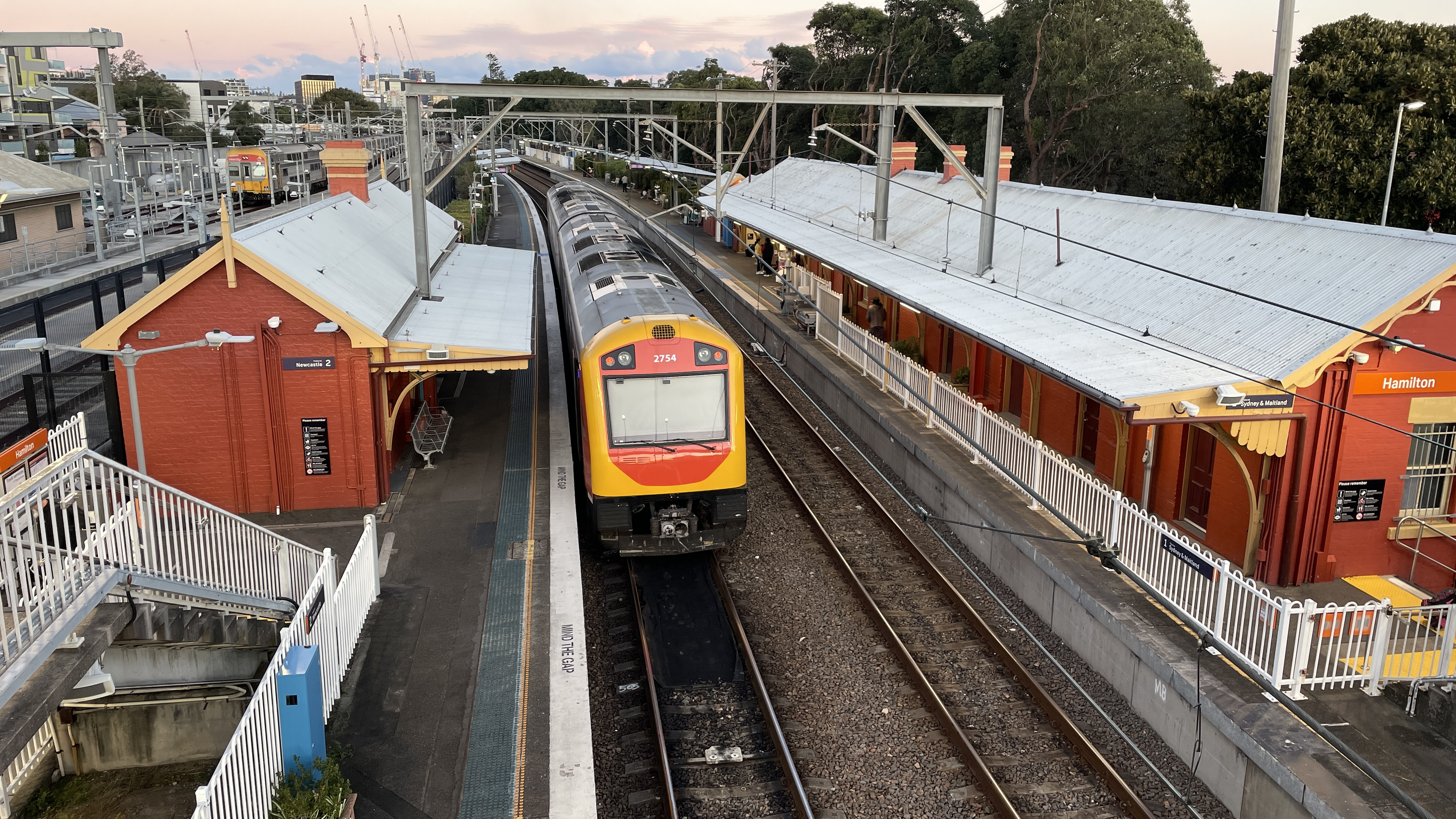
- Eastbound view from footbridge, June 2025

General information
- Location: Beaumont Street, Hamilton, New South Wales; Australia
- Coordinates: 32°55′07″S 151°44′55″E
- Owner: Transport Asset Manager of New South Wales
- Operator: Sydney Trains
- Line: Newcastle
- Distance: 164.63 km (102.30 mi) from Central
- Platforms: 2 side
- Tracks: 2
- Connections: Bus

Construction
- Structure type: Ground
- Accessible: Yes

Other information
- Status: Staffed
- Station code: HAM
- Website: Transport for NSW

History
- Opened: 1872; 154 years ago

Passengers
- 2025: 365,890 (year); 1,002 (daily) (Sydney Trains, NSW TrainLink)

Services
| Preceding station | Intercity Trains | Following station |
|---|---|---|
| Newcastle Interchange Terminus | Central Coast & Newcastle Line | Broadmeadow towards Central |
| Newcastle Interchange Terminus | Hunter Line | Waratah towards Dungog or Scone |
Location

Hamilton railway station is a heritage-listed railway station on the Newcastle line in the inner Newcastle suburb of Hamilton in New South Wales, Australia. It was added to the New South Wales State Heritage Register on 2 April 1999.

On 5 January 2015, Hamilton became the temporary terminus for NSW TrainLink's Central Coast & Newcastle and Hunter line services after the partial closure of the Newcastle line. It fulfilled this role until Newcastle Interchange opened on 15 October 2017.

== History ==
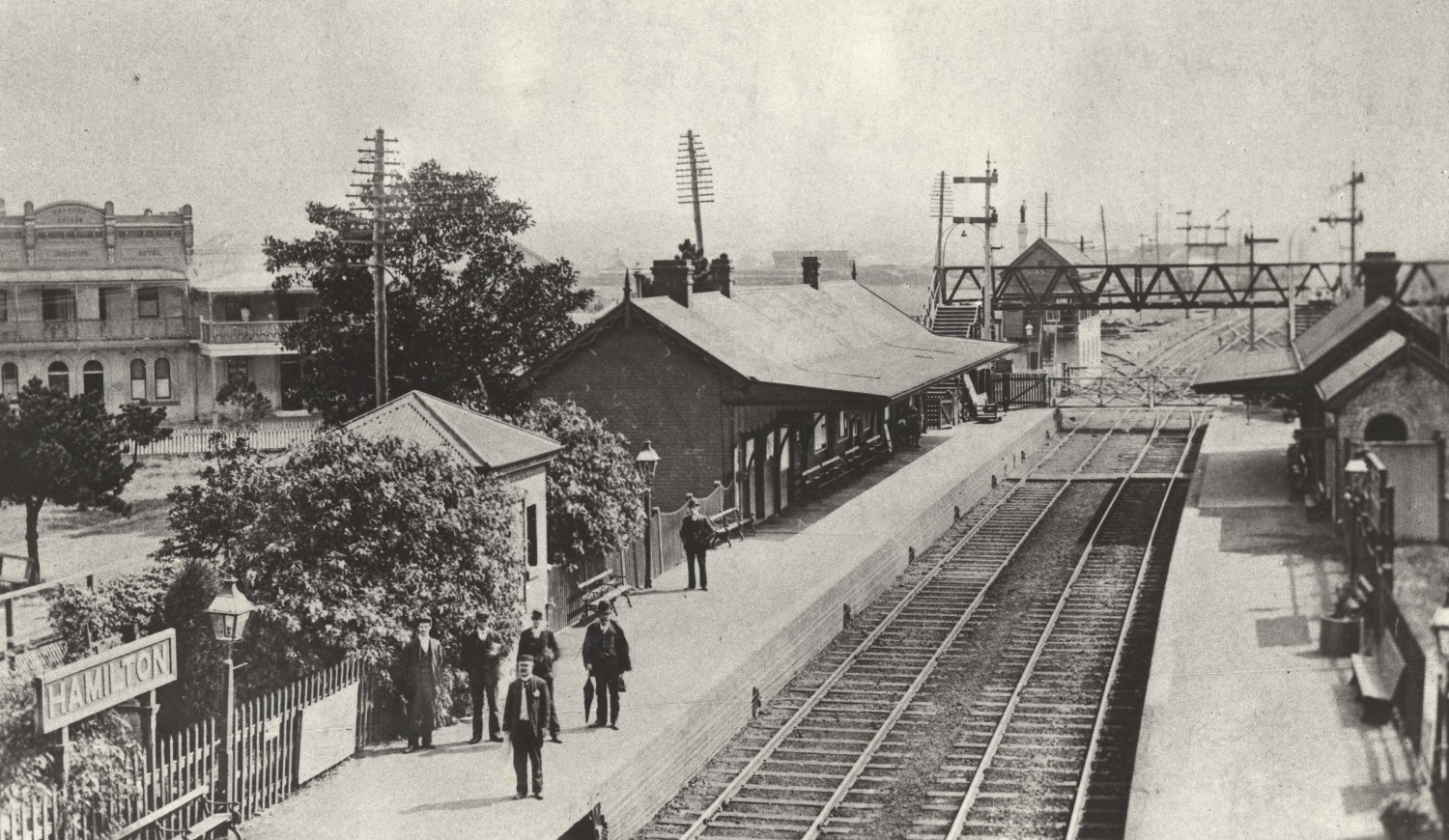
View looking west in 1906

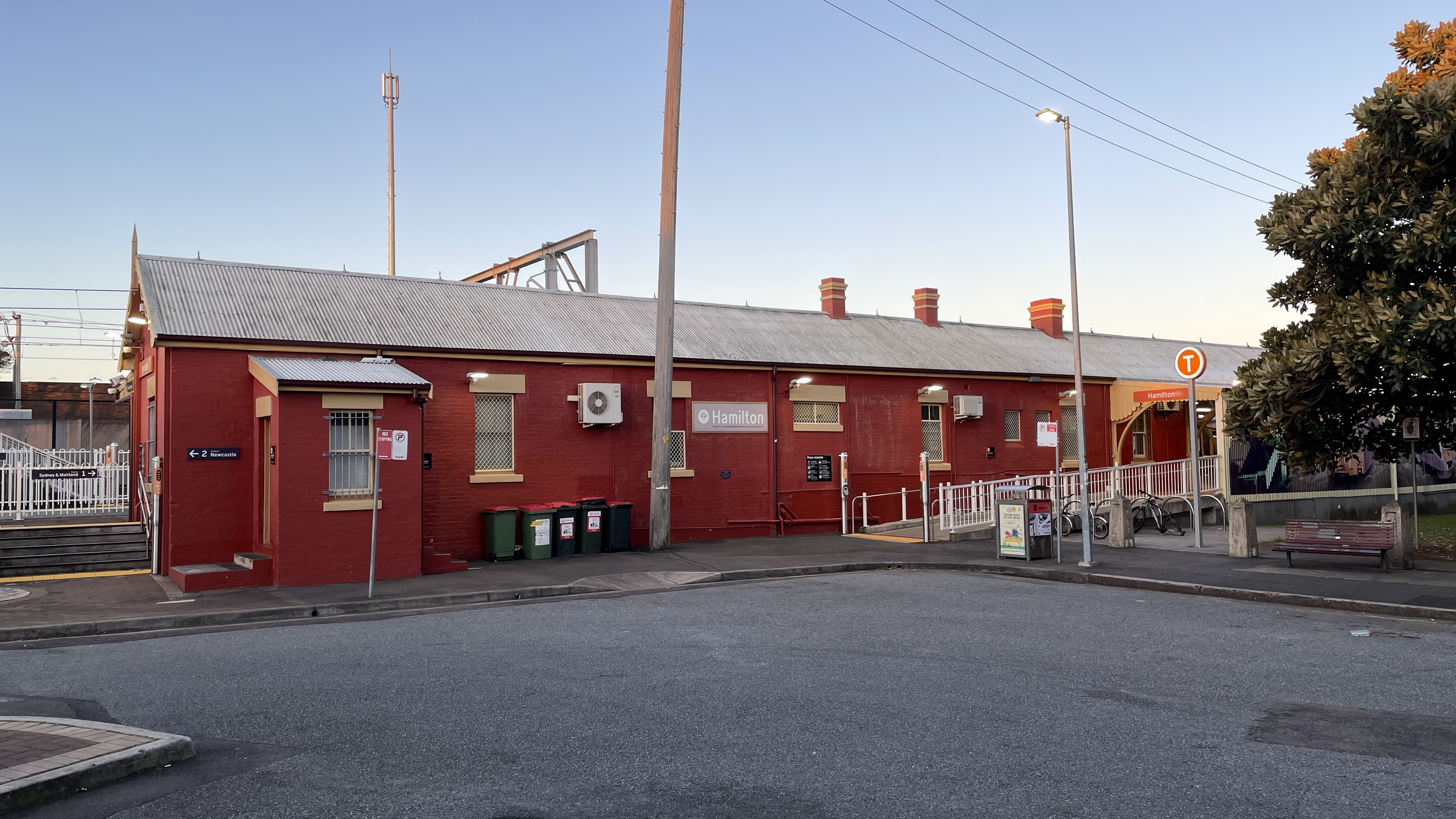
Bus stop and entrance on Beaumont Street

The Main Northern line between Sydney and Newcastle was constructed in two distinct stages and in the earliest years, was worked as two separate railway systems. The line between Sydney (actually the junction at Strathfield) and the Hawkesbury River was opened on 5 April 1887, with the terminus being on the southern bank of the Hawkesbury River. The line between Newcastle and the northern bank of the Hawkesbury River (near present-day Wondabyne) was opened in January 1888. The line was completed through between Sydney and Newcastle with the opening of the massive rail bridge over the Hawkesbury River in 1889.

Hamilton is located on the Northern line, between Broadmeadow and Newcastle Interchange. In 1857, the railway was opened in the Newcastle area when a line was opened from Honeysuckle Point to East Maitland. Unfortunately, neither of these locations were near sea ports, one of the main reasons for the establishment of rail transport in the Newcastle area.

By 1858, the Newcastle-end had been extended to the sea port and the East Maitland-end had been extended into the town of Maitland. By the 1870s, the Main Northern line had been extended further up the Hunter Valley and to Murrurundi. Initially, single lines were laid in the area, but by the 1860s, most lines had been duplicated.

Hamilton Railway Station was opened in 1872, between Newcastle and Waratah.

In January 1888, a line had been constructed from Hamilton, south to the Hawkesbury River. The railway junction between the GNR and the new main line toward the Hawkesbury River was named Hamilton Junction. A signal box was built at Hamilton Junction in 1888, later being replaced by a new elevated brick, standard style signal box in 1898.

In 1892, a locomotive depot was built in the triangular area of land formed by the line from Newcastle toward Maitland, the line from Hamilton toward the Hawkesbury River and the line between Waratah and Broadmeadow, which in effect joined the GNR to the line to Sydney. The locomotive depot replaced the first depot in the Newcastle area – Honeysuckle Point. Hamilton locomotive depot was itself replaced by the much larger Broadmeadow Locomotive Depot in 1924.

At Hamilton, two side platforms were built, one for the Up main line and one for the Down main line. A goods yard was laid in behind the Down (northern side) platforms. A number of station buildings (in brick) were constructed on each platform.

At the Sydney-end of the platforms, Beaumont Street crossed the main lines and part of the goods yard, and a footbridge (parallel to Beaumont Street) spanned the main lines allowing access to the platforms. Pedestrians normally crossed the railway tracks using the Beaumont Street level crossing, but when a train was due in either direction, and the level crossing gates were closed, the same pedestrians could use the station footbridge to cross the tracks.

Hamilton Junction signal box (also at the Sydney-end of the platforms and adjacent to the level crossing) controlled the main lines, the level crossing gates and access to the nearby Substation / Electrical and Mechanical depot sidings. Up until 1924, Hamilton Junction signal box also controlled the entry and departure (by locomotives) to Hamilton locomotive depot, situated in the triangle.

Between c. 1890 and the 1970s railway gardens proliferated, with competitions and prizes for the best ones. A Railway Nursery was set up at Homebush station in Sydney in 1923 and another smaller one at Hamilton station although most plants were sourced from staff's home gardens or donations by residents.

Electrification of the main line between Gosford and Newcastle was opened in May 1984, an extension of the Sydney-Gosford electrification which had been completed in 1960. The new electrification project involved new or rebuilt platforms, station buildings, footbridges, overbridges and underbridges, line side buildings, sidings and myriad structures in that section in order to permit the operation of the wider electric passenger rollingstock and electric locomotives.

Accordingly, some upgrading was undertaken at Hamilton, and that included total replacement of the original footbridge. Some station buildings on each platform have been upgraded, but the original brick main station buildings on each platform are extant, albeit with some modern features. The goods sidings behind the down main line platform have been removed. The existing Hamilton Junction signal box retains control of the main lines and Beaumont Street level crossing.

In 2007, Platform 1 was extended eastwards to accommodate eight carriages and allow Beaumont Street level crossing to remain open while trains are at the station. In January 2015, Platform 2 was extended eastwards to accommodate eight carriages.

As part of the works to relocate the line's terminus to Newcastle Interchange, stabling sidings are to be laid behind Platform 2 on the site of the former goods yard.

== Services ==
Hamilton has two side platforms. It is serviced by Sydney Trains Intercity Central Coast & Newcastle Line services travelling between Sydney Central, Gosford and Newcastle. and Sydney Trains Intercity Hunter line services travelling between Newcastle, Maitland, Singleton, Muswellbrook, Scone, Telarah and Dungog.

| Platform | Line | Stopping pattern | Notes |
| 1 | CCN | Services to Gosford & Sydney Central | |
| 1 | HUN | Services to Maitland, Telarah, Dungog, Singleton, Muswellbrook & Scone | |
| 2 | CCN | Services to Newcastle | |
| 2 | HUN | Services to Newcastle | |

Hamilton Station is served by a number of bus routes operated by Newcastle Transport.

External image
- Hamilton station map/bus guide by Transport for NSW

== Description ==
The heritage-listed station complex includes the station buildings on Platform 1 (c. 1875, altered 1898) and Platform 2 (1898), toilet block, store room (c. 1898), signal box (1898), platforms (c. 1984), level crossing, footbridge (1976) and the station landscaping.

The station is located immediately east of the Beaumont Street level crossing and comprises two platforms (each with a platform building) and modern footbridge. All station buildings have been painted cream in colour. The southern side of the station contains a small garden and commuter carpark, whilst the northern side contains several buildings amongst a large amount of cleared area following the removal of a goods yard. Immediately to the west of the level crossing is the Hamilton Junction Signal Box and Hamilton Depot (see separate listing). Two early twentieth century pubs, one either side of the Beaumont Street crossing, reflect the importance of the Junction as a major working hub.

The station building on Platform 1 is a single storey face brickwork building with gabled corrugated iron roof. The building is thought to be the original c. 1875 third-class station building, modified in 1898 to its current configuration. The awning is supported on curved cast iron brackets and has been extended to the east where it forms a large sheltered seating area adjacent to the ticket office. The roof form of this enclosed seating area follows the form of the station building. Three brick chimney stacks with corbelled string courses are located at the northern end of the station building. Both ends of the station have retained their original timber scrolled bargeboards and finials which add greatly to the otherwise utilitarian structure. The easternmost wall of the station building (seating area) features a corrugated iron wall. The building is typical of the suburban and regional railway stations constructed during the last decades of the late nineteenth century. As per these buildings all windows are timber framed double hung sash windows. Doors are four panelled generally with glazing in the upper panels.

Internally, the walls are painted plaster, and original joinery is generally extant. Floor finishes are generally modern (either tiled or linoleum). Ceilings are modern plasterboard with cornices, although some original boarded ceilings remain. The station masters office features a timber mantelpiece and a blocked fireplace.

Externally, The station building on Platform 2 (Down Platform) is very similar to the building on Platform 1, being of brick construction with a corrugated iron gabled roof, and replaced an earlier building on Platform 2. The roof features bargeboards (not scrolled) and timber finials. There is a central double breasted chimney stack with corbelled brick string course. A small awning (not the whole length of the building) is supported on arching cast iron brackets and features timber valances. All external original joinery is still extant, including double hung sash windows. The eastern end of the building features an attached brick toilet block with gabled roof (slightly lower than the station building), also with bargeboards and finial. The toilet block wall presents three recessed lower bays and six sets of air vents to the platform side, and is entered by an arched brick opening.

A small brick toilet block exists at the eastern end of Platform 1. The building has a tiled floor and corrugated iron gabled roof, and is likely to be the most recent building to have been constructed on the platforms at Hamilton railway station.

A small store room is located at the Newcastle (eastern) end of the Platform 1 building. It is unsure when the structure was built, but it features in a c.1900 photograph of the station. The building is square in plan and is of brick construction with a corrugated iron hipped roof. Access is by a door in the eastern wall, while the northern wall features a small window. A storage box for a wheelchair ramp is attached to the northern wall.

Hamilton Junction signal box is located adjacent to the main Sydney to Newcastle railway line and Beaumont Street at the Sydney-end of Hamilton railway station. The signal box is a two-storey Type E2 structure. The ground floor is of brick construction and features four six pane arched windows on the northern (railway line) elevation. The southern (Esplanade) elevation is of brick construction to roof height with two timber framed sash windows, while the northern wall is brick to sill height, above which sliding timber-framed six pane glazed windows extend around the perimeter. The gabled roof is corrugated fibre cement sheeting with gables of tongue-and-groove timber horizontal boarding. Original timber barge boards and finials have been removed, as has the original stair and balcony on the eastern (Beaumont Street) elevation which has been replaced with a utilitarian steel structure. A corbelled brick chimney has been removed from the centre of the rear elevation. The building has been painted cream in colour.

Internally, Hamilton Junction was built to contain a large mechanical-type lever frame. The ground floor contains interlocking levers and rodding, a separate relay room and signal control wiring. The upper floor (operating level) contains a large mechanical lever frame with 56 large-type signal / point levers, track / signal diagrams, telephones and other equipment necessary for the functioning of an important signal box. Control equipment for the adjacent level crossing gates and warning lights are located at the Newcastle-end of the signal box. Sliding, timber-framed 6 pane glass windows are located in the front (northern) wall and both end walls to assist with natural lighting, although the windows at the north-east corner have been replaced with aluminium framed single panes. A fireplace has been infilled in the centre of the southern wall. The upper floor has a timber floor and timber tongue-and-groove panelling on the walls. The ceiling (originally tongue-and-groove but since covered over) is of plasterboard.

Platforms have modern precast concrete faces and asphalt surfaces. The eastern ends of the platforms feature well maintained garden beds with small shrubbery. All furniture, lights and bins are standard late 20th century standard SRA spec.

The Beaumont Street level crossing is a key feature of the Hamilton Railway Station precinct, and features early twentieth century boom gates imported from the United States in operational condition. The level crossing is operated by the adjacent Signal Box.

The original steel framed footbridge was replaced in 1976 by a steel beam structure over the main line at the level crossing. The footbridge spans over the land formerly occupied by sidings on the northern side of the Platform 2 building.

The Newcastle Field Depot for the Transport Asset Holding Entity's Communications & Control Systems is located at No.4 Fern Street, on the northern side of Hamilton railway station (excluded from listing). This large, hip-roofed, brick building is of modern construction and stands on the site formerly occupied by sidings. It was not inspected in early 2009. The area surrounding 4 Fern Street was a former goods yard and siding. Some tracks remain, but mostly this area is unused. There are a number of mature trees in this area and adjacent to 4 Fern Street.

The signal box contains a large number of significant moveable items associated with the operation of the signal box, the majority of which are still in use. Significant items include: a timber-framed telephone with exterior brass bells; a wall clock with State Rail logo; timber wall-mounted box with alarm bell; a row of ten alarm bells above the southern window; a framed signalling diagram of Hamilton Junction dating from Dec 1940; an illuminated signal indicator board; a cantilevered shelf along the northern window above the signalling frame with attached alarm; and a timber framed control for the operation of the level crossing boom gate in the NE corner of the room.

In addition to the landscaping on the platforms, a large number of mature trees are located on the southern side of the eastern end of Platform 1, extending through to Donald Street. The trees include Camphor Laurels, palms and eucalypts, and form a picturesque background to the curving station platforms. Most of this landscaping is not contained within railway land but provides an attractive setting for the station.

== Hamilton Junction Signal Box ==
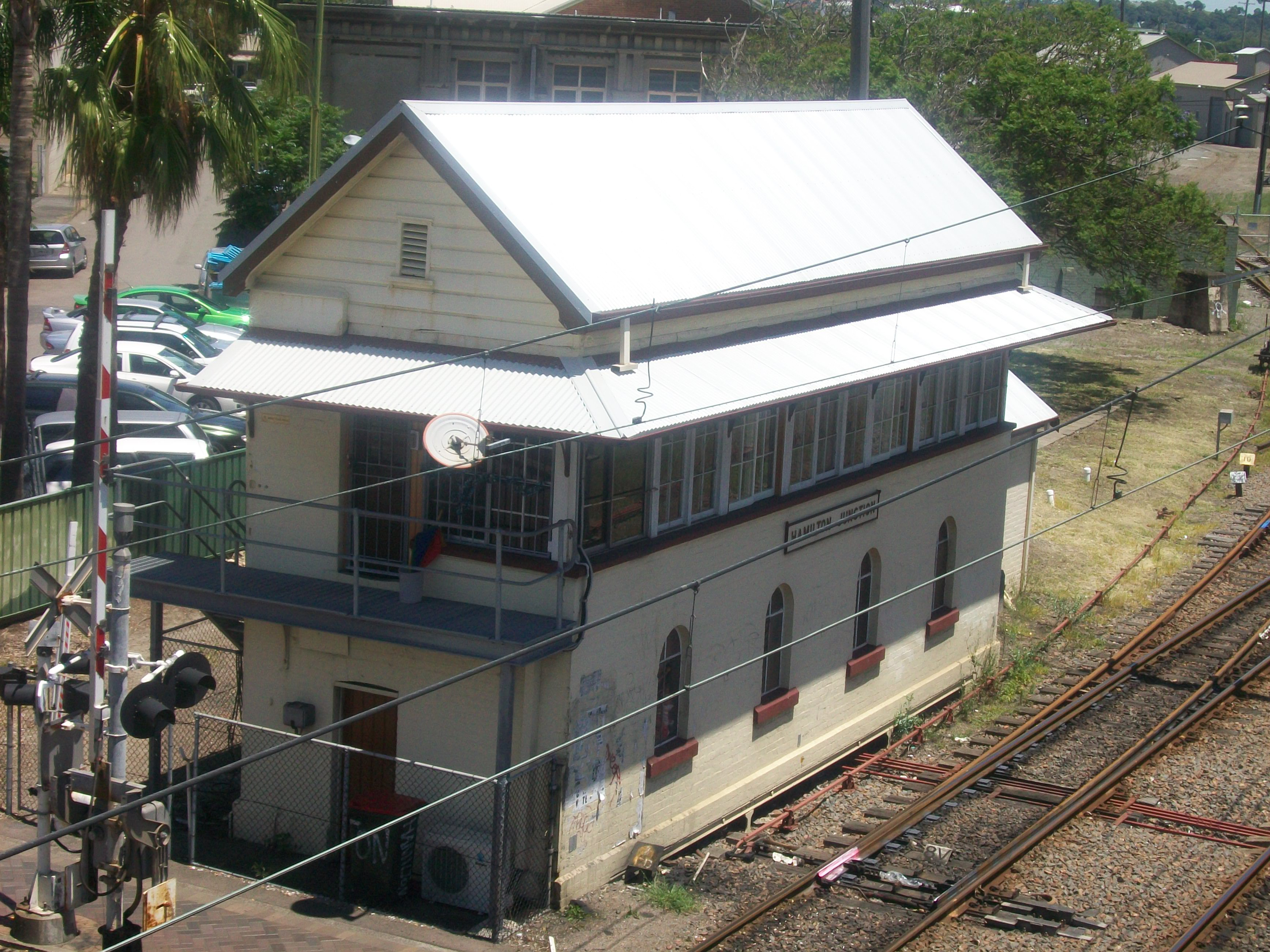
Hamilton Junction signal box in November 2011

Hamilton Junction Signal Box is separated from Hamilton station by Beaumont Street level crossing. The Victorian signal box was built in 1897 by McKenzie & Holland, making it one of the oldest surviving mechanical signal boxes in Australia, and also one of the busiest. Originally fitted with a McKenzie & Holland mechanical lever frame, it now has a 56 lever tappet frame designed by Cyril Byles, the British born New South Wales Government Railways signal engineer and manufactured in Sydney in the former NSWGR Interlocking Workshops. Formerly a much busier location, this signal box once had control of multiple lines, sidings and a short branch for the Vacuum Oil Company. After rationalisation in the 1980s and 1990s, the signal box now controls Hamilton Junction, Beaumont Street level crossing and entry to and exit from sidings used for storing track maintenance vehicles.

== Heritage listing ==
Hamilton Railway Station Group has significance at a state level as part of the wider Hamilton and Woodville Junction railway precinct, formerly one of the most important railway junctions in the State. It was established in 1873 before the construction of the Short North and as such has direct associations with operation of the Great Northern Railway, which was one of the first railway lines in Australia. While there was some limited settlement in the area prior to this date, the construction of the railway encouraged the rapid subdivision and development of the township. Hamilton Railway Station is significant as the junction station between the Great Northern Railway and the Short North, and for its association with the former Hamilton locomotive depot between 1892 and 1924. The platform buildings are good examples of highly intact Victorian railway buildings in their original setting which form part of an excellent example of a late 19th century suburban railway junction, with a range of items still intact including signal box, level crossing, sidings, depot and surrounding hotels and shops. The signal box is considered to be historically rare as an excellent example of a historic signalling installation and retains much original fabric, including the signal lever frame, and has been in constant use for over 110 years.

Hamilton railway station was listed on the New South Wales State Heritage Register on 2 April 1999 having satisfied the following criteria.

- The place is important in demonstrating the course, or pattern, of cultural or natural history in New South Wales.

Hamilton Railway Station has historical significance at a state level. Hamilton Railway Station forms a major part of the wider Hamilton railway precinct, formerly one of the most important railway junctions in NSW. It was established in 1873 before the construction of the Short North and as such has direct associations with operation of the Great Northern Railway, which was one of the first railway lines in Australia. While there was some limited settlement in the area prior to this date, the construction of the railway station encouraged rapid subdivision and development of the township. Hamilton railway station has historical significance as the junction station between the Great Northern Railway and the Short North and for its association with the former Hamilton locomotive depot between 1892 and 1924.

Hamilton Junction signal box forms an important element of the greater Hamilton railway precinct, controlling the main lines, level crossing gates, and (until 1924) access to the Hamilton locomotive depot. The Hamilton Junction signal box retains much original fabric, including the signal lever frame, and has been in constant use for over 110 years.

- The place is important in demonstrating aesthetic characteristics and/or a high degree of creative or technical achievement in New South Wales.

Hamilton Railway Station has aesthetic significance at a state level. The platform buildings are good examples of late nineteenth century railway station buildings. Although the original Platform 1 building underwent early alterations and additions, the two platform buildings remain largely intact with relatively minor exterior alterations and in their original 1898 setting. Hamilton Railway Station forms an important component of a wider railway precinct and the level crossing in particular has a direct relationship with the signal box and adjacent hotels on Beaumont Street.

Hamilton Junction signal box has aesthetic significance at a state level. The signal box is a good example of a Type E2 signal box, or what was later to become known as a "Standard Signal Box". The building has undergone relatively few alterations since its construction and remains in original condition. The building occupies a prominent position not only within the Hamilton railway junction, but also within the wider railway precinct along Beaumont Street that includes the two adjacent railway hotels. The signal box has landmark status within the town, adjacent to the level crossing at the "gateway" to Hamilton.

The signal box has technical significance at a state level as a fully operational example of a late nineteenth century mechanical lever frame signal box, one of very few such signal boxes still in operation in the state. Hamilton Junction signal box contains a relatively large mechanical lever frame (56 levers) and over the past 100 years has exercised control over one of the busiest railway junctions in the state. In the past, Hamilton Junction signal box controlled train operations at the station, the nearby road level crossing, the goods yard, a number of nearby industrial sidings, and between 1892 and 1924, also controlled access to and from Hamilton locomotive depot.

1. The place has strong or special association with a particular community or cultural group in New South Wales for social, cultural or spiritual reasons.

The place has the potential to contribute to the local community's sense of place and can provide a connection to the local community's history.

- The place has potential to yield information that will contribute to an understanding of the cultural or natural history of New South Wales.

Hamilton Junction signal box has research significance at a local level. The signal box and its frame remains in close to original condition and is a fully operational example of late nineteenth century signalling and railway technology. It is an important reference site for its type.

The archaeological research potential of the site is low.

- The place possesses uncommon, rare or endangered aspects of the cultural or natural history of New South Wales.

Hamilton Railway Station is considered to be rare within the metropolitan north region as a relatively intact example of a late nineteenth century railway junction. Hamilton Junction signal box, in particular, is considered to be historically rare at a State level. Signal boxes are (or were) exceptionally important installations as far as railway operations are concerned. Safe and reliable handling of passenger and goods trains was paramount and the signal box and its operators were a major part of that task. Over recent years many installations, including railway signal boxes, have been removed and/or replaced by modern technology. Hamilton Junction signal box is an excellent example of a historic signalling installation. The signal box was constructed in 1898 and is a good representative of a style which the New South Wales railways termed as a "Standard Signal Box". More than 80 of this style were built, but demolitions and removal of many examples means that few examples of this style remain. Hamilton signal box is rare as a fully operational signal box in a prominent suburban context still using the original mechanical lever signal frame.

- The place is important in demonstrating the principal characteristics of a class of cultural or natural places/environments in New South Wales.'

Hamilton Railway Station, together with the Hamilton signal box and depot, is considered a good representative example of a late nineteenth century suburban railway junction, because it has a high degree of integrity with a range of buildings still intact from the late nineteenth and early twentieth centuries, including station buildings, level crossings, signal box, sidings, and surrounding hotels and shops. The remnants of the Hamilton depot are also close by. The Hamilton Junction "standard" type signal box is also considered a good example of both late nineteenth century railway architecture and technology,
