= East Maitland railway station =

Railway station in New South Wales, Australia

East Maitland
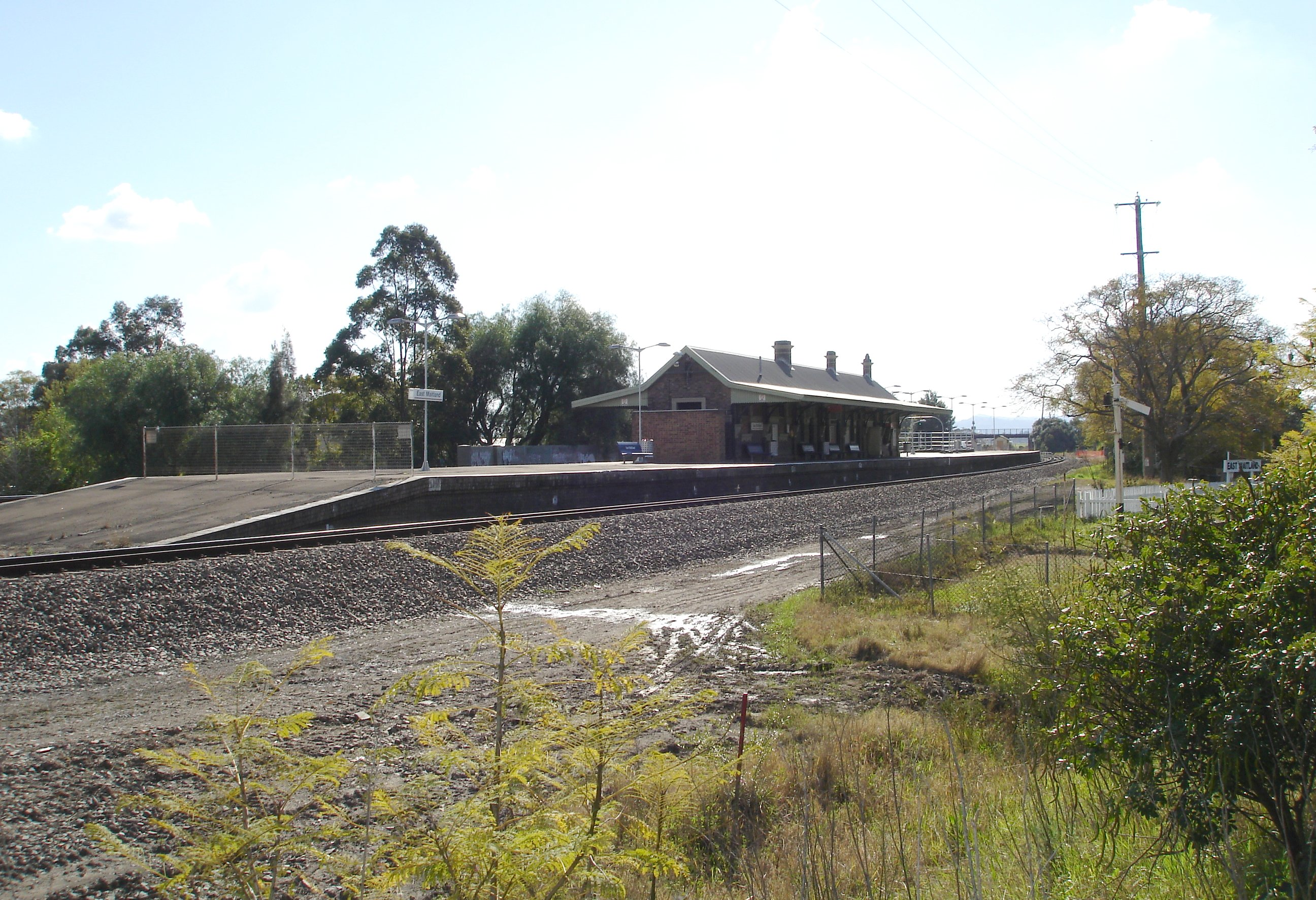
- Westbound view of the station platforms, August 2006

General information
- Location: Melbourne Street, East Maitland; Australia
- Coordinates: 32°44′41″S 151°35′15″E
- Owner: Transport Asset Manager of New South Wales
- Operator: Sydney Trains
- Line: Main Northern
- Distance: 188.83 km (117.33 mi) from Central
- Platforms: 2 (1 island)
- Tracks: 4

Construction
- Structure type: Ground
- Accessible: No

Other information
- Status: Weekdays: Staffed: 7.45am–3.45pm: Weekends and public holidays: Unstaffed
- Station code: EAM
- Website: Transport for NSW

History
- Opened: 1914; 112 years ago
- Former names: Morpeth Junction (1866–1873)

Passengers
- 2025: 14,999 (year); 41 (daily) (Sydney Trains, NSW TrainLink)

Services
Preceding station	Intercity Trains	Following station
High Street towards Telarah or Scone	Hunter Line	Victoria Street towards Newcastle Interchange
Location
- Location within New South Wales

East Maitland railway station is a heritage-listed railway station located on the Main Northern line in New South Wales, Australia serving East Maitland. It is the fourth site of the station known as East Maitland. It was added to the New South Wales State Heritage Register on 2 April 1999.

== History ==
The first site to bear the East Maitland name was a temporary terminus while the bridge over Wallis Creek was being built, was about where Victoria Street is now. The second was directly north of William Street between the East Maitland Courthouse and Post Office.

The third site was opened originally as Morpeth Junction when the short Morpeth branch to Morpeth opened in 1866 and was about 400 metres west of the present East Maitland. The second station closed in 1873 and became the goods yard and Morpeth Junction was renamed East Maitland.

The current site was opened in 1914 when the Main Northern line was quadrupled with the two extra coal roads built south side of the existing tracks. At that time the Morpeth branch was realigned to allow trains to proceed directly from Newcastle instead of from Maitland. It received its own platform on a lower level. The new site of East Maitland became the junction and the third East Maitland then became the goods siding. For many years after 1916 there were five tracks from the goods siding to just east of East Maitland station. The remains of this can be seen in the wider than now required overpass of Melbourne Street and in the wider Pitnacree Road bridge over the railway line.

The line to Morpeth closed in 1953 with the branch line platform at East Maitland still remaining today.

== Platforms and services ==
East Maitland has one island platform with two faces. It is serviced by Sydney Trains Hunter Line services travelling between Newcastle, Maitland and Telarah. It is also serviced by one early morning service to Scone.

Platform	Line	Stopping pattern	Notes
1	HUN	services to Newcastle	
2	HUN	services to Maitland & Telarah	1 early morning service to Scone

== See also ==
- List of regional railway stations in New South Wales
