= 1955 Hunter Valley floods =

Natural disaster in Australia

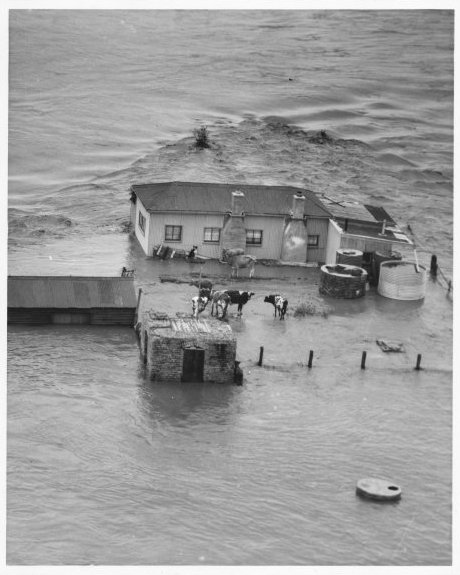
A deserted farmhouse on the outskirts of Maitland during the 1955 flood

The Hunter Valley Floods (also known as the Maitland Flood) of 23 February 1955 was a major flood on the Hunter River in New South Wales, Australia. They were one of the most devastating natural disasters in Australia's history.

The flood overwhelmed rivers on both sides of the Great Dividing Range, creating an inland sea the size of England and Wales. Worst hit was the inland city of Maitland, which is sited precariously on low-lying land on the Hunter, and which on this occasion was completely inundated by floodwaters. A total of 25 lives were claimed during a week of flooding that washed away 58 homes and damaged 103 beyond repair. In Maitland alone, 2,180 homes were invaded by water.

== History ==
=== Background ===
Heavy rain owing to the influence of La Niña had been occurring over the catchment of the Hunter River since October 1954 when, on 23 February 1955, an extremely intense monsoonal depression developed over southern Queensland and north-east New South Wales and moved southwards. The very strong and extremely moist northeasterly airflow meant that over the basin of the Hunter and parts of the Darling River, rainfall amounts for a 24‑hour period were the highest since instrumental records began around 1885. Around Coonabarabran, as much as 327 millimetres (over 13 inches) fell in a single day, whilst falls in the upper part of the Hunter Basin the following day were generally around 200 millimetres (7.9 inches).

=== Flooding ===
With such heavy rain on already very wet ground the Hunter, along with tributaries of the Darling (Castlereagh, Namoi and Macquarie especially). reached levels quite unprecedented since measurements were first taken about 100 years earlier. For instance, the Namoi's discharge, normally only about 25 cubic metres per second (880 cu ft/s), reached a massive 9,000 cubic metres per second (320,000 cu ft/s), whilst the Macquarie peaked at around 6,100 cubic metres per second (220,000 cu ft/s).

In Maitland the Hunter exceeded its August 1952 record height by nearly a metre, flooding as many as 5,000 homes with as much as five metres of muddy water. 15,000 people were evacuated, most by boat or helicopter, whilst 31 homes were never rebuilt. In Dubbo, four thousand residents were evacuated as the main street was under more than a metre of turgid, muddy water, and the same thing occurred all along the Macquarie River, and at Gilgandra, a third of the buildings were completely destroyed. A hole torn in the main street was later found to contain two large semi-trailers.

The floods took altogether the lives of 25 people. Some 2,000 cattle and many thousands of head of other livestock were drowned. The damage to bridges, roads, railways and telephone lines took months to repair. There also were millions of pounds worth of crops destroyed.

== Timeline ==
Below in a timeline of the six days over which Maitland was ravaged by floodwaters:

- 24 February 1955 – Torrential rain covers the Hunter Valley. Flights are cancelled at Williamtown Airport. First lives are lost as floodwaters submerge Singleton, stranding 600 people at the railway station and convent. People living in low-lying areas of Maitland are warned of imminent evacuation as water rises across the valley and an emergency declared. During the night, Muswellbrook in the Upper Hunter goes under water and a mail train crashes into floodwaters at Togar.
- 25 February 1955 – 1,100 people stand stranded on the platform at Singleton Railway Station as the Hunter River begins to overflow in the Maitland suburb of Bolwarra. The main crossing over the river, the Belmore Bridge, is closed at 8:30am and evacuation of the city begins. The Mayor of Maitland warns of an approaching "wall of water" at 11 am as the first major levee failures occur, first at Oakhampton where homes are instantly ripped from their foundations. Before nightfall, water is 2 m deep on the city's main thoroughfare, High Street. Five men are swept to their deaths across the city, three at the railway station. A Royal Australian Navy Bristol Sycamore helicopter hits power lines in Maitland – two people who were being taken to safety died and the helicopter crashed into the flood waters. The two crew were swept downstream but were later rescued by an Army DUKW During the night, floodwaters thunder through the city. 21 homes are washed away on one residential street alone, many occupants still inside or clinging to rooftops. Only female victim of the flood, Elizabeth Dickson is swept to her death in pitch darkness.
- 26 February 1955 – Australian Army DUKWs and Surf Life Saving Australia surfboats rescued over 1,000 people across the city, many stranded on rooftops. An army DUKW carrying military, police and ambulance personnel at Louth Park struck live power lines; the resulting electrical strike instantly killed two soldiers and caused the later death of a Sydney Water Police Constable. Nearby Raymond Terrace is hit hard while flooding extends across the valley. The entire township of Hexham, situated between Maitland and Newcastle on the Hunter River, is completely submerged and every resident evacuated. Floodwaters affect Newcastle and bring disruptions to industry and bring about evacuations in several suburbs, particularly Birmingham Gardens. 23 people were rescued by Royal Australian Navy helicopters, one of which crashed while rescuing people at Maitland railway station.
- 27 February 1955 – Thousands homeless, refugees taken to Greta migrant camp and homes all over the Hunter Valley as water levels remain at a historic high. The Royal Australian Air Force air drops 4,000 food parcels.
- 28 February 1955 – Water begins to subside, leaving thick layers of stinking silt and debris. Clean-up begins as areas begin to emerge from the floodwaters. Samuel Upton is found drowned in his Maitland home while refugees continue to be moved to Greta by the thousands.
- 1 March 1955 – Joseph Murray drowns; the last victim of the flood.

== Resulting flood-warning system ==
At the time of the Hunter Valley flood, there was no system in place to monitor and predict the height of rivers, the likelihood of flooding, nor was there an effective system for disseminating this information. Some of these functions were done by State governments, but they were not nationally coordinated. The 1955 flood provided the political impetus for the federal Bureau of Meteorology to develop a national flood monitoring and forecasting service.
