= Maitland railway station =

Railway station in New South Wales, Australia

Maitland
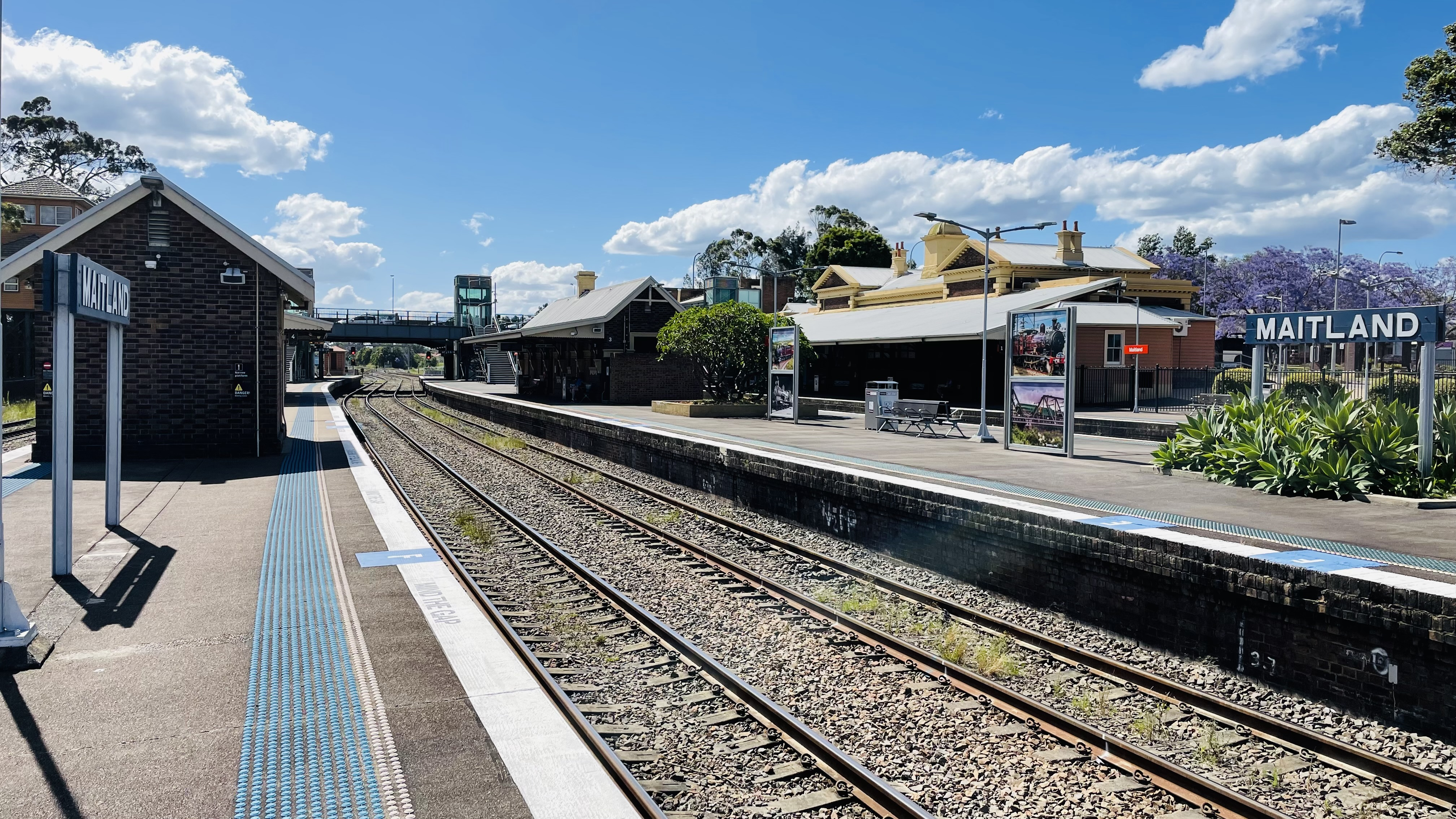
- Westbound view from Platform 4, November 2022

General information
- Location: Church Street, Maitland; Australia
- Coordinates: 32°44′17″S 151°33′07″E
- Owner: Transport Asset Manager of New South Wales
- Operator: Sydney Trains
- Lines: Main Northern; North Coast
- Distance: 192.55 km (119.65 mi) from Central
- Platforms: 5 (1 side, 2 island)
- Tracks: 6
- Connections: Bus

Construction
- Structure type: Ground
- Accessible: Yes

Other information
- Status: Staffed
- Station code: MTL
- Website: Transport for NSW

History
- Opened: 1880; 146 years ago
- Former names: West Maitland (1880–1949)

Passengers
- 2025: 206,186 (year); 565 (daily) (Sydney Trains, NSW TrainLink)

Services
Preceding station	Intercity Trains	Following station
Telarah towards Dungog	Hunter Line	Victoria Street towards Newcastle Interchange
Telarah Terminus	Hunter Line	High Street towards Newcastle Interchange
Lochinvar towards Scone	Hunter Line	High Street towards Newcastle Interchange
Preceding station	NSW TrainLink	Following station
Dungog towards Grafton, Casino or Brisbane	NSW TrainLink North Coast Line	Broadmeadow towards Sydney
Singleton towards Moree or Armidale	NSW TrainLink North Western Line	Broadmeadow towards Sydney
Former services
Preceding station	Former services	Following station
Farley towards Wallangarra	Main Northern Line (1860–1975)	High Street towards Sydney
East Greta Junction towards Cessnock	Cessnock Line (1904–c.1975)	Terminus
Location

Maitland railway station is located on the Main Northern line in New South Wales, Australia. It serves the city of Maitland opening on in 1880 as West Maitland being renamed Maitland on 1 April 1949. It is the junction station for the Main Northern and North Coast lines. It was added to the New South Wales State Heritage Register on 2 April 1999.

== History ==
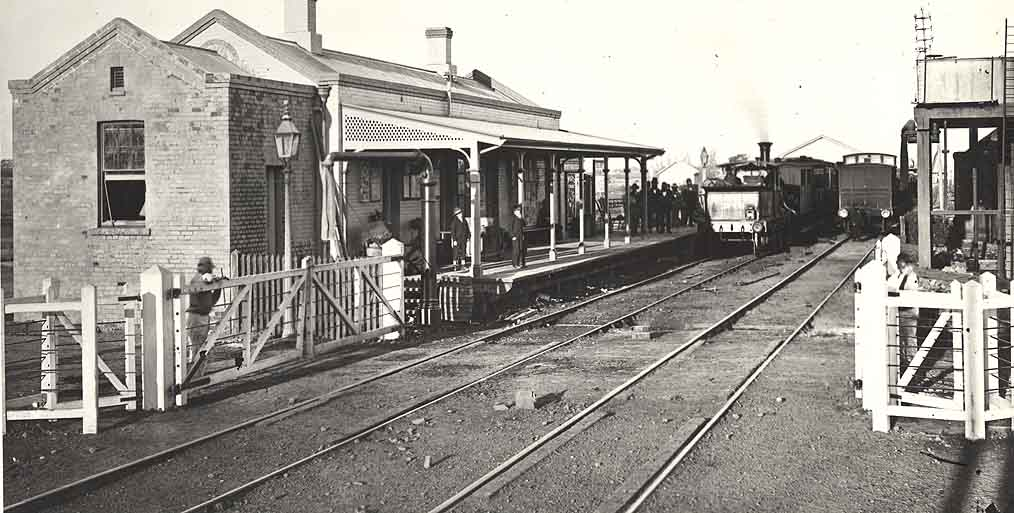
Station in 1877

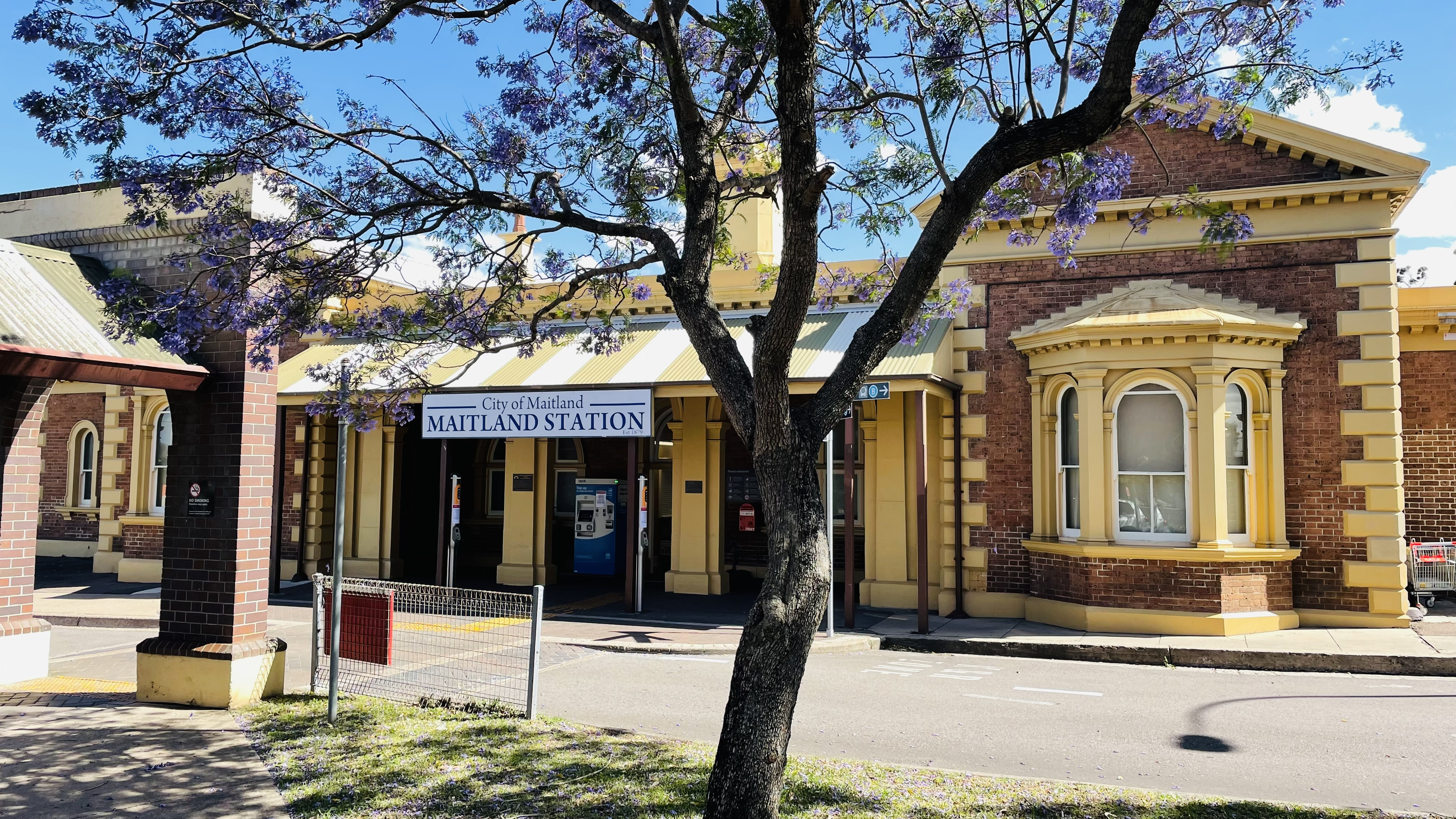
Station front in November 2022

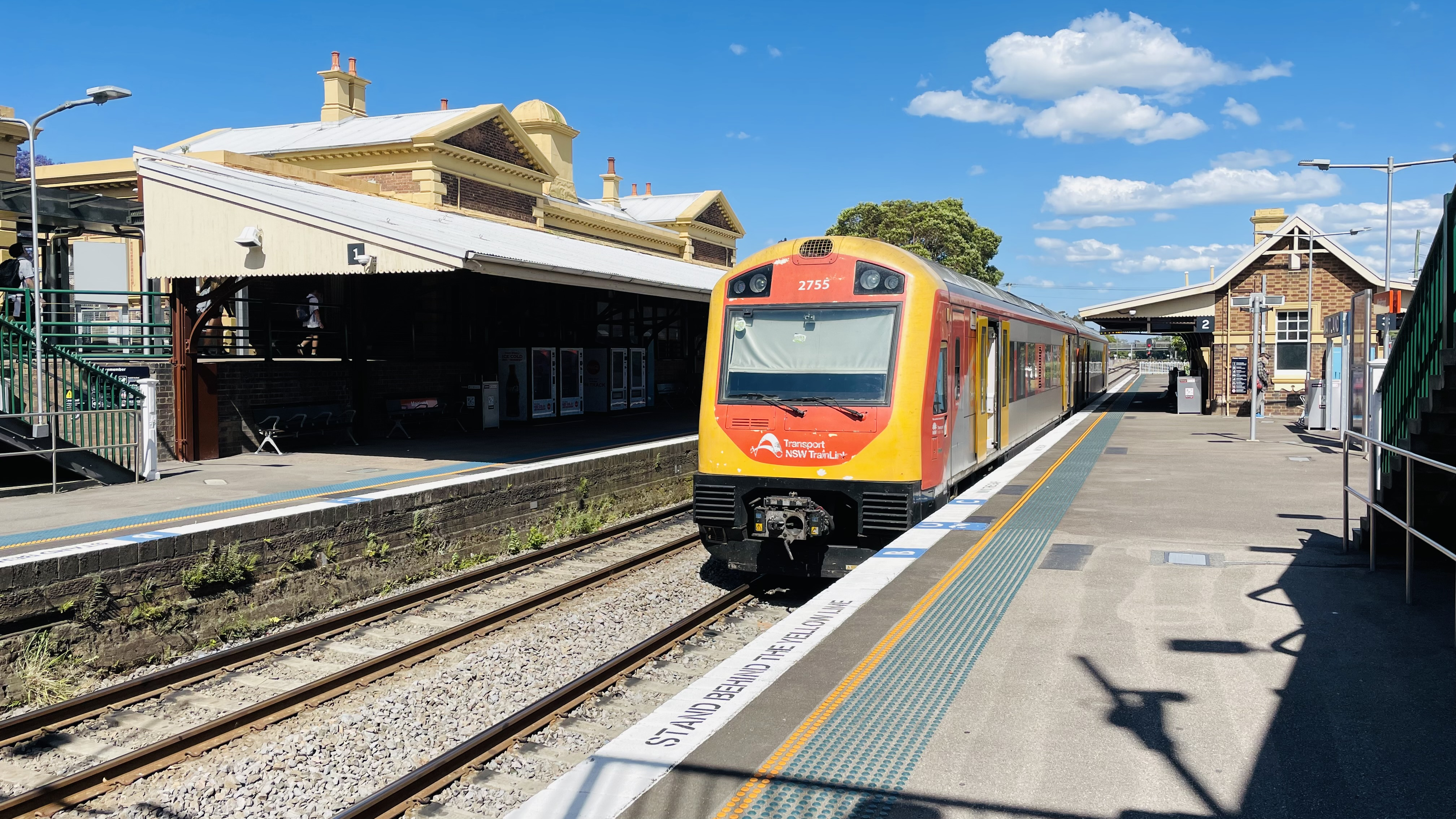
Hunter railcar on Platform 2

Endeavour railcar on Platform 3

The Great Northern Railway was built through Maitland in the 1850s and extended to Lochinvar in July 1860. Maitland was serviced by Victoria Street, East Maitland and High Street when it opened; however, it was not until 1880 that what is now Maitland's principal station opened as West Maitland.

Initially the station comprised only one platform, the present Platform 1. The station expanded with an island platform and footbridge constructed in 1914 followed in 1933 by another island platform. In April 1949, in recognition of its position as Maitland's primary station, it received its present name. A bay platform was located at the eastern end of Platform 1 for terminating services from Newcastle, it was removed in the 1990s.

The station is susceptible to floods. In the 1955 floods, the signalbox was washed away with its replacement constructed on stilts. This closed on 27 October 1990 and has been leased to a model railway club. The high water marks have been marked on the building on Platform 1. Flood gates have been installed at the northern end of the platforms. A new signal box opened opposite the station on 17 December 1990.

A yard is located east of the station. It is mainly used to stable railway maintenance equipment, although each April is used as a depot for locomotives attending the Hunter Valley Steamfest.

Immediately east of the station, the Main Northern and North Coast lines split, while about 500 metres west of the station the South Maitland Railway line to Pelton branches south.

On 27 July 2015, Maitland was the first station to receive a Regional Customer Support Centre covering the Central Coast, Hunter and North West areas of NSW.

== Platforms and services ==
Maitland has five platforms, although only four are used by passenger trains. It is serviced by Sydney Trains Hunter Line services travelling from Newcastle to Singleton, Muswellbrook, Scone, Telarah and Dungog.

It is also serviced by NSW TrainLink Xplorer and XPT long-distance services from Sydney to Armidale, Moree, Casino and Brisbane. Trains to Newcastle Interchange depart every hour off peak, 10 minutes on-peak, while trains to Telarah or Dungog depart every 45 minutes off-peak, 15 minutes on-peak. Trains to Singleton and Scone depart every 3 hours, while some peak-hour trains depart every hour and a half.

Platform	Line	Stopping pattern	Notes
1	HUN	services to Newcastle & Telarah	
1	North Coast Region	services to Sydney Central	
2	HUN	services to Dungog & Telarah	
2	North Coast Region	services to Casino & Brisbane	
3	HUN	services to Newcastle terminating services to & from Newcastle	
3	North Western Region	services to Sydney Central	
4	HUN	services to Singleton, Muswellbrook & Scone	
4	North Western Region	services to Armidale/Moree	
5		not in regular passenger service, Hunter Valley Coal Chain trains pass through. Formerly used by passenger services to Cessnock on the South Maitland Railway.	

== Events ==
Each April, Maitland station is the focal point for the Hunter Valley Steamfest, an event that has been held annually since 1986, with exception of 2020-2022.

== Transport links ==
Hunter Valley Buses operates seven bus routes via Maitland station, under contract to Transport for NSW:

- 179: Stockland Green Hills to North Rothbury via Rutherford with limited services to Hanbury Estates
- 180: Stockland Green Hills to Singleton Heights via Rutherford
- 180X: to Singleton express via Lochinvar, Greta and Branxton
- 181: Aberglasslyn to Woodberry via Metford
- 182: Thornton to Rutherford via Ashtonfield
- 183: Rutherford to Tenambit via Telarah
- 185: to Largs via Bolwarra, with limited services to Paterson and Gresford
- 192: to South Maitland and Louth Park

Rover Coaches operates two bus routes via Maitland station, under contract to Transport for NSW:

- 164: to Cessnock via Kurri Kurri, limited services operate to Stockland Green Hills
- 166: Stockland Green Hills to Kurri Kurri via Gillieston Heights, Heddon Greta & Pelaw Main

Sid Fogg's operates one coach route via Maitland station:

- Newcastle station to Dubbo station via the Golden Highway

== Description ==
The station complex includes two brick station buildings, the platform 1 building completed in 1880 of type 5 first-class design, and the platform 2/3 building completed in 1914 of type 11 initial island/side building design. The signal box is of elevated timber on a steel frame and was completed in 1956, and the booking office, on the street facing Railway Parade, was completed in 1948. There is also a pedestrian overbridge connecting the road to the platforms. Maitland is also the busiest station on the Hunter Line (excluding Hamilton and Newcastle Interchange) because of the link with the XPT, and the 40 000 residents who call Maitland home.

== Heritage listing ==
The Maitland station group is of high significance both as a complete unit, and for its individual elements. The various buildings date from the earliest surviving on the north line through to the 1950s forming a harmonious group with an important civic contribution particularly from the booking office and first class station building. The site is of additional interest with the relationship of the first class building to the alignment of platform 1 and the extended awning down to the realigned and lowered line which is unique in the railway system. The main station building is of high significance and is a very important building in Maitland and in the State particularly with its adaptive awning structure. The other buildings at the station including the signal box are significant and indicate the importance of the location as a commercial centre and junction station, particularly with the adjacent Maitland colliery system which linked with the main line nearby to the west. The number of platforms also indicate the importance of the site for changing trains and as a centre of commerce and the furthest link of the Newcastle commuter rail system.
