= Stockland Green Hills =

- Location: East Maitland, New South Wales, Australia
- Coordinates: 32°45′46″S 151°35′29″E
- Address: 1 Molly Morgan Drive
- Opened: 14 November 1977
- Manager: Stockland
- Owner: Stockland
- Num. of stores: 250
- Num. of anchor tenants: 6
- Floor area: 75,796 m^{2} (815,861 sq ft)
- Floors: 2
- Parking: 3,125 spaces
- Website: www.stockland.com.au

Stockland Green Hills, formerly Green Hills Shopping Centre, is a large indoor/outdoor shopping centre located in East Maitland, New South Wales, Australia.

It is located on Molly Morgan Drive near the New England Highway, on a 15.7-hectare (38.8-acre) parcel of land.

== Transport ==
Victoria Street railway station is a 20 minute walk from Stockland Green Hills and is located on the Main Northern railway line.

Stockland Green Hills has Hunter Valley Buses bus connections to Maitland, Morpeth, Newcastle Airport, Rutherford, Tenambit, Thornton and Woodberry, as well as local surrounding suburbs. The majority of its bus services are located on Molly Morgan Drive and Mitchell Drive.

Stockland Green Hills has multi level car parks with 3,125 spaces.

== History ==
Green Hills Shopping Centre opened on 14 November 1977 as a single level shopping centre with car parks. It featured Big W, Woolworths and 80 specialty stores. In December 2000 Stockland acquired the centre and renamed it Stockland Green Hills.

In late 2001, Stockland Green Hills underwent a redevelopment involving the refurbishment of Big W and Woolworths and the addition of 40 specialty stores. In September 2002 a full line Coles supermarket, food court and 40 specialty stores opened.

In October 2011 the $350 million expansion plans were approved with construction to start in 2012. The redevelopment plans were to expand the centre onto existing car parks and add a second level of retail. Myer, a discount department store, an additional 130 specialty stores and 1,500 extra car parking spaces were planned to open in this new development. The two level Myer store was planned to open between July 2013 and June 2014.

However in August 2012 Myer delayed its planned opening of the store and the redevelopment was delayed. In December 2013 it was again announced that the redevelopment would start in the second half of 2014 but no work started.

On 12 March 2015, after receiving its half-yearly financial update, Myer announced that it would no longer be included in the planned expansion of the centre. Myer had previously stated that it would open a store at Green Hills in the 2017-18 financial year.

On 9 July 2015 David Jones announced it would open a single level store as part of the centre's planned development. Myer was originally planning to open over two levels, but David Jones announced that a single level store on the new upper level would be more appropriate. As a result of this decision two mini majors and one additional specialty store would be located in the lower space that had previously been earmarked for Myer.

The $377 million redevelopment was announced on 4 November 2015 and construction work started in January 2016. This development was completed on 17 May 2018 and cost $414 million. The redevelopment doubled the size of the centre and added a second level.

The ground level was expanded and featured the same Big W, Coles and Woolworths, as well as new stores including Harris Scarfe, JB Hi-Fi, a new relocated Best & Less, The Reject Shop, a new fresh food precinct and an additional 80 stores. The two level H&M store opened on both ground level and level one.

New stores on level one included David Jones, Target and 100 specialty stores. Level one also featured a new relocated food court, an outdoor restaurant precinct known as "The Courtyard" with seating for 1000 diners and has unique LED light trees and a Timezone which features a bowling alley, laser tag and arcade games. Level one also has escalator access to P6 car park and Hoyts Cinema. The seven screen Hoyts cinema opened on 9 June 2018 and features two 40-seat Lux theatres and two Xtremescreens and three regular screens.

The new centre outdoor restaurant precinct connects the centre with level access to Mitchell Drive.

After being placed into receivership on 11 December 2019, the Harris Scarfe store closed down on 21 January 2020. The former Harris Scarfe space was reconfigured and replaced by Cotton On which opened on 5 September and TK Maxx which opened in October 2020.

On 16 September 2020 Target closed its store as part of its store network converting existing stores into Kmart stores. Kmart opened at Stockland Green Hills on 1 October 2020.

David Jones will close its store by the end of 2026.

== Tenants ==
Stockland Green Hills has 75,796m² of floor space. The major retailers include David Jones, Big W, Kmart, Coles, Woolworths, Cotton On, H&M, TK Maxx, JB Hi-Fi, Timezone and Hoyts Cinema.
