= Newcastle Interchange =

Railway station in New South Wales, Australia

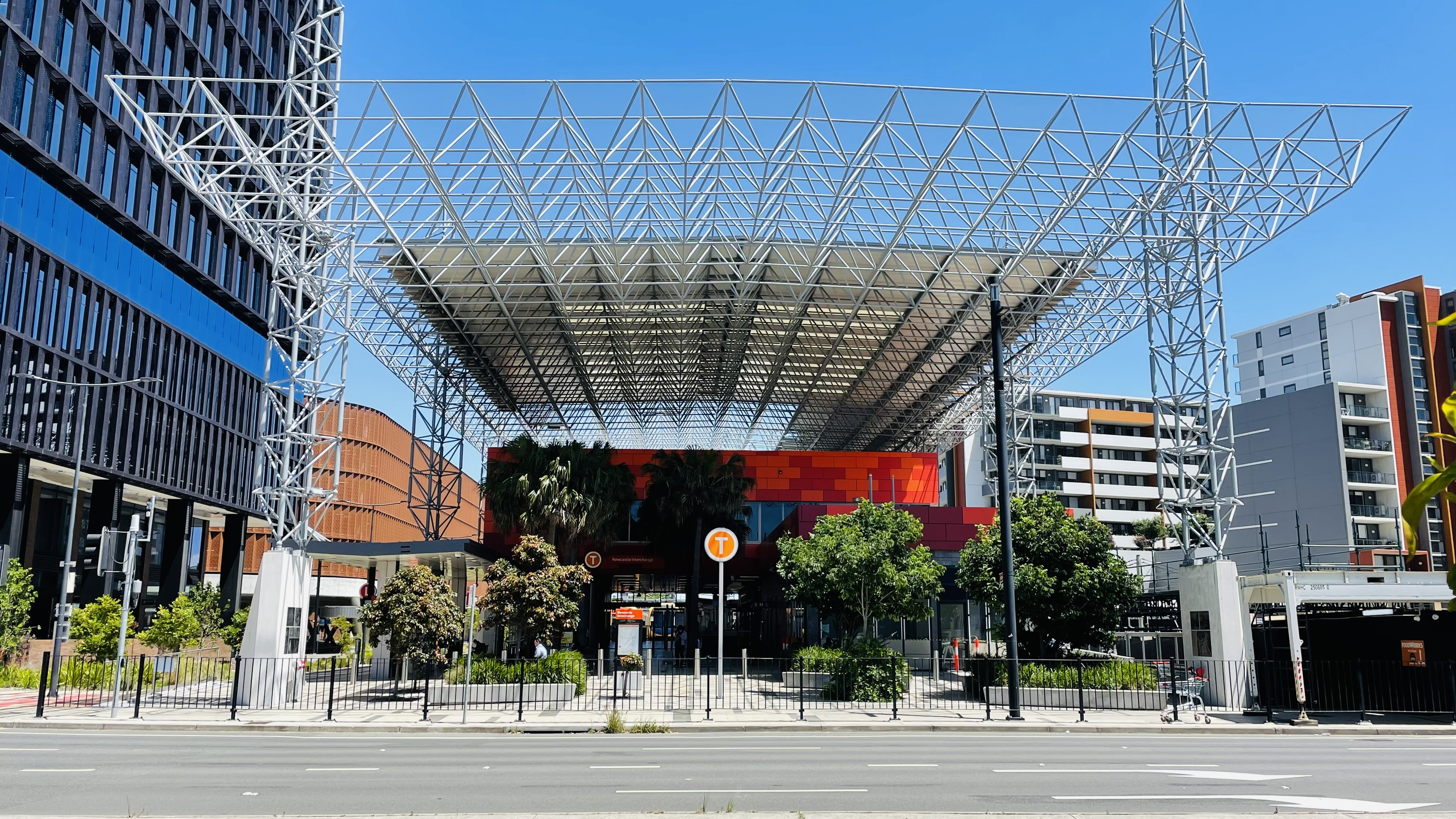
- The interchange from Stewart Avenue, November 2022

General information
- Location: Station Street, Wickham; Australia
- Coordinates: 32°55′28″S 151°45′35″E
- Owner: Transport Asset Manager of New South Wales
- Operator: Transport for NSW; Newcastle Transport; Sydney Trains
- Line: Newcastle
- Distance: 165.60 kilometres (102.90 mi) from Sydney Central
- Platforms: 3 (1 side, 1 island)
- Tracks: 3
- Connections: Train; Bus; Light Rail

Construction
- Structure type: Ground
- Accessible: Yes

Other information
- Status: Staffed
- Website: Transport for NSW

History
- Opened: 15 October 2017; 8 years ago
- Former names: Wickham railway station

Passengers
- 2025: 1,041,685 (year); 2,853 (daily) (Sydney Trains, NSW TrainLink)

Services
Preceding station	Intercity Trains	Following station
Terminus	Central Coast & Newcastle Line	Hamilton towards Central
Terminus	Hunter Line	Hamilton towards Dungog or Scone
Preceding station	Newcastle Light Rail	Following station
Terminus	Newcastle Light Rail	Honeysuckle towards Newcastle Beach
Location
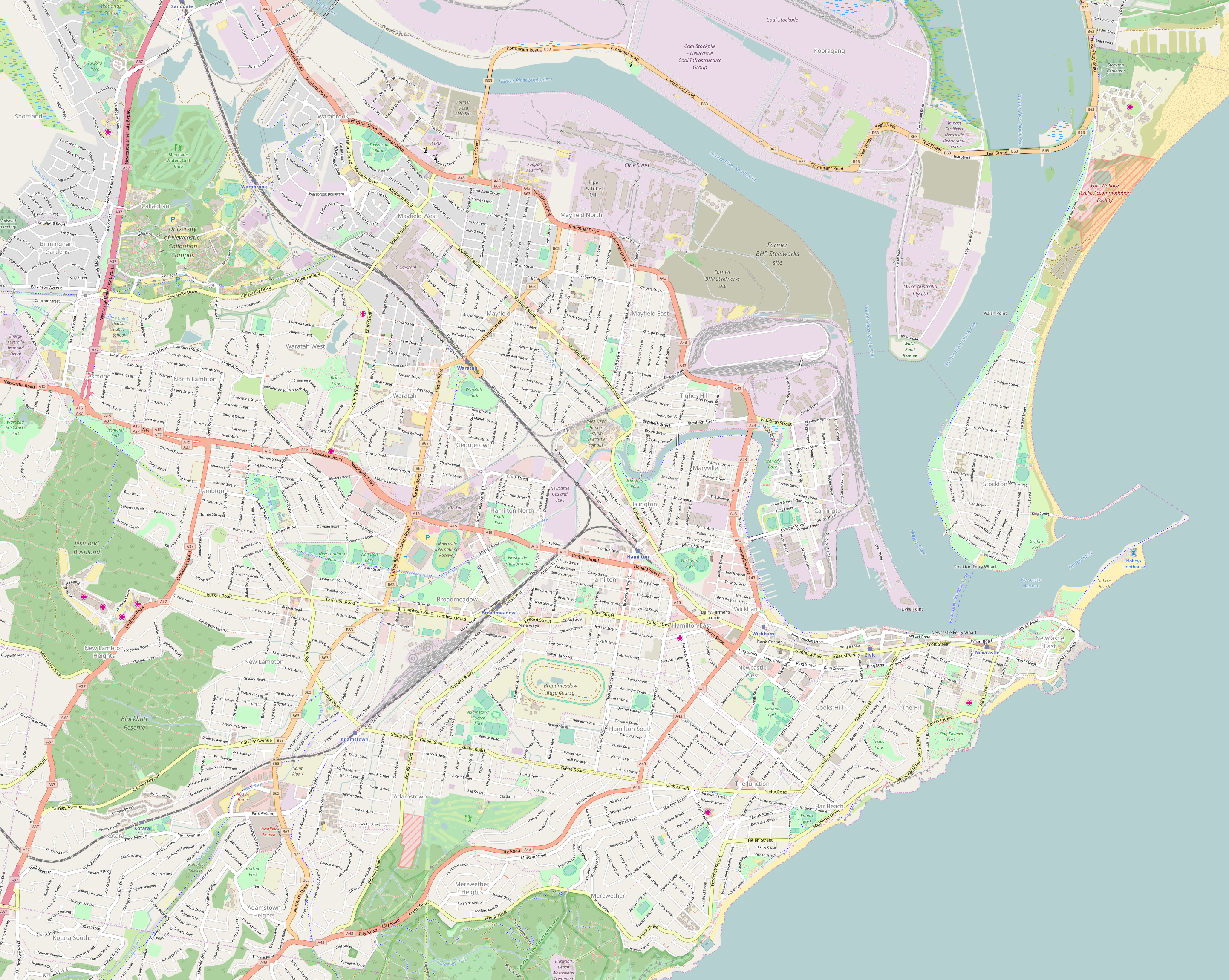
- Location within Newcastle, Australia

Newcastle Interchange is a transport interchange serving the city of Newcastle, New South Wales, Australia. It serves as the terminus for Central Coast & Newcastle Line and Hunter Line train services, Newcastle Light Rail services and Newcastle Transport bus routes.

Located in the inner Newcastle suburb of Wickham, it is to the west of the former Wickham station. The railway station opened 15 October 2017 with light rail services commencing on 17 February 2019.

== History ==
As part of its plans to revitalise the Newcastle central business district, the Newcastle railway line was closed east of Hamilton on 25 December 2014 to allow construction of the Newcastle Light Rail line. Included in the project was a transport interchange.

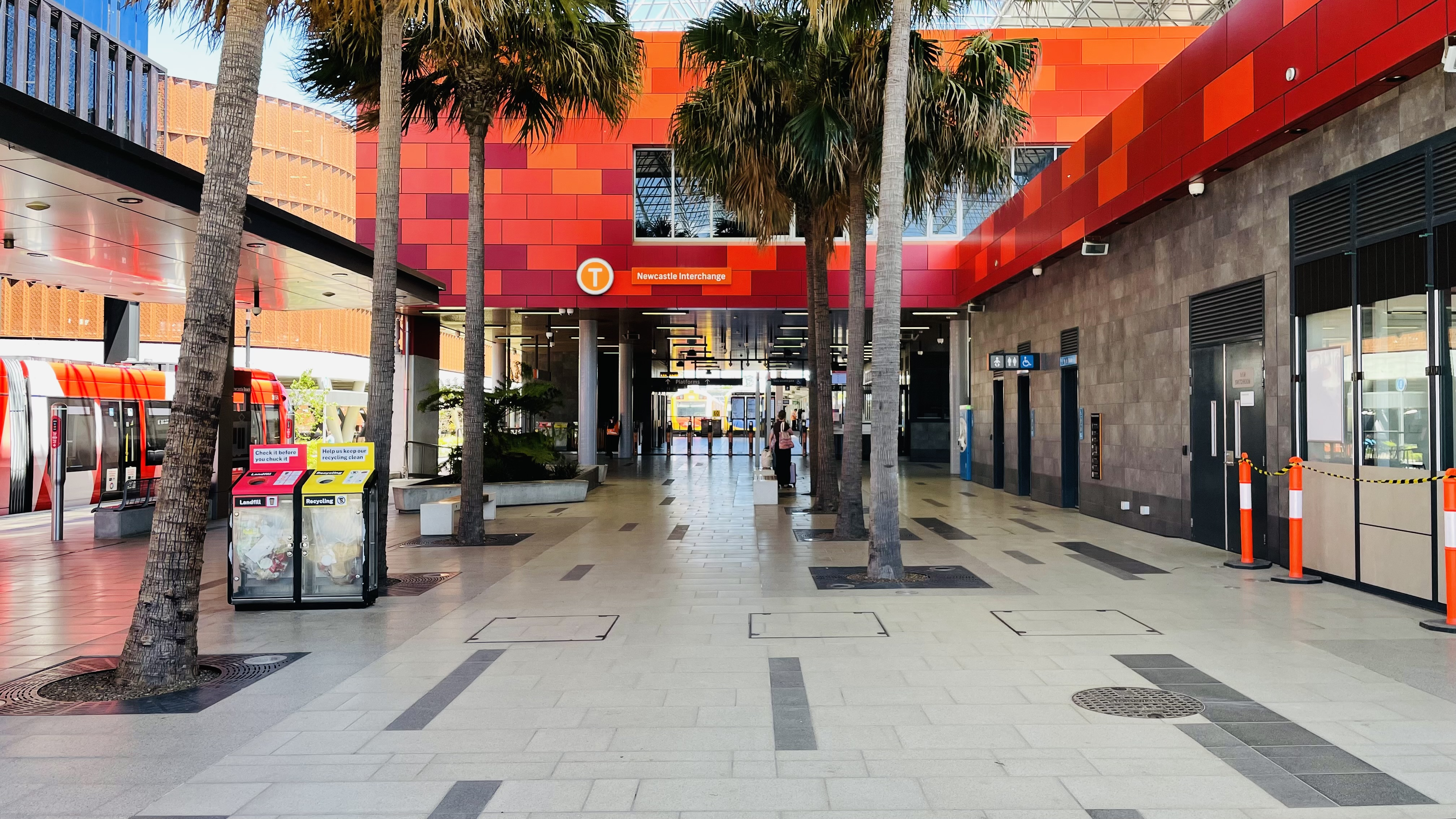
Concourse

The design for the new interchange was released by Transport for NSW in July 2015. Originally to be named Wickham Transport Interchange, in December 2015, Transport for NSW lodged a proposal with the Geographical Names Board of New South Wales to have the station name changed to Newcastle Interchange. This was confirmed in December 2016.

Construction commenced in May 2016 after being delayed by a legal challenge to the line's closure. The railway station was opened on 15 October 2017 by then Transport Minister Andrew Constance. Light rail services commenced on 17 February 2019.

A World War I honour roll was placed at the end of platform 1. Originally installed at Wickham Superior Public School, it was donated to the Newcastle Museum after the school had to be demolished following the 1989 Newcastle earthquake.

== Services ==
External image
- Newcastle Interchange Public Transport Map, 2020 by Transport for NSW

=== Heavy rail ===
Newcastle Interchange is serviced by Sydney Trains Intercity Central Coast & Newcastle Line services to and from Gosford and Sydney Central and Sydney Trains Intercity Hunter Line services to and from Maitland, Singleton, Muswellbrook, Scone, Telarah and Dungog.

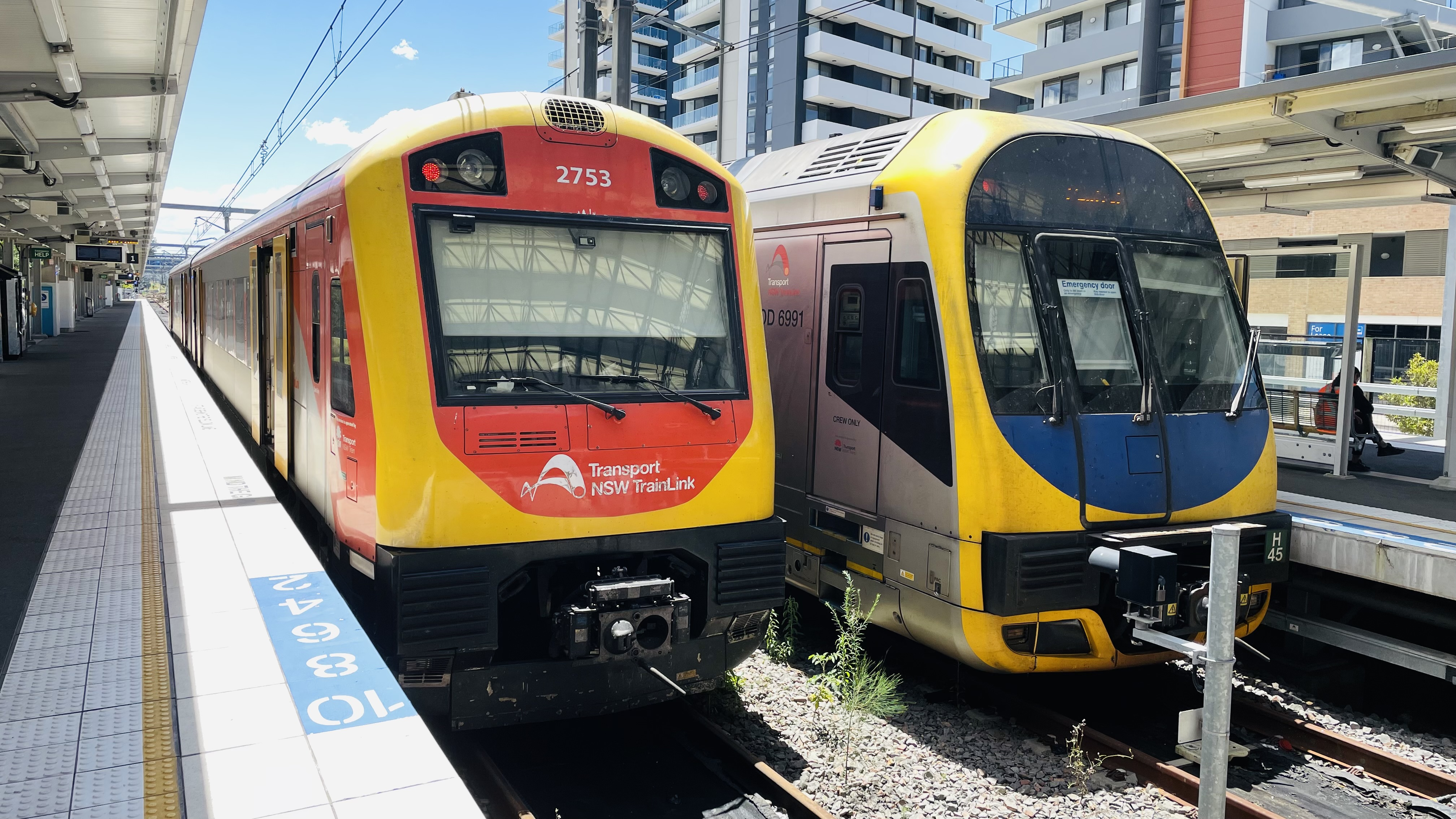

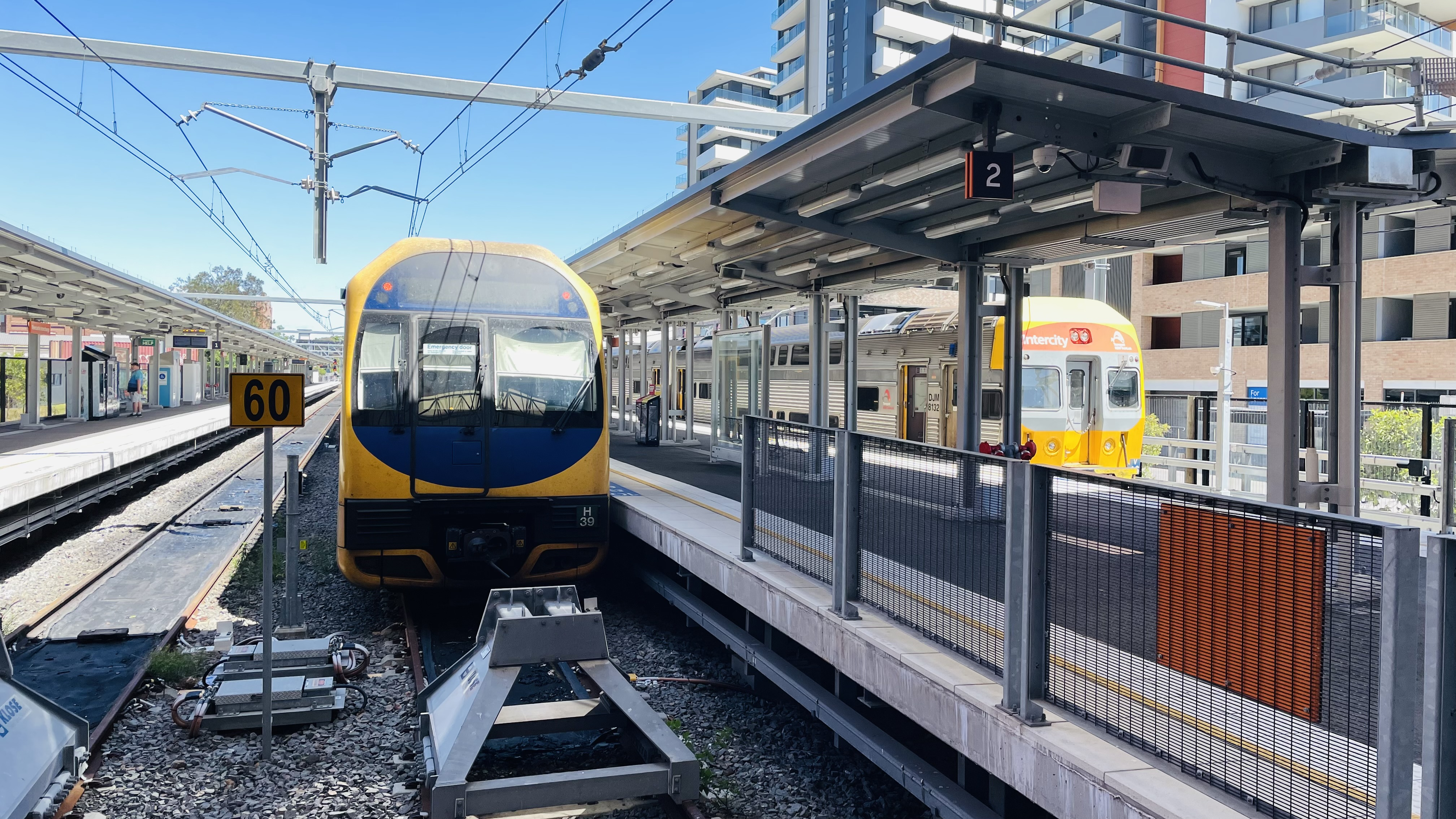

Platform	Line	Stopping pattern	Notes
1	CCN	Services to Gosford & Sydney Central	
1	HUN	Services to Maitland, Telarah, Dungog, Singleton, Muswellbrook & Scone	
2	CCN	Services to Gosford & Sydney Central	
2	HUN	Services to Maitland, Telarah, Dungog, Singleton, Muswellbrook & Scone	
3	CCN	Services to Gosford & Sydney Central	
3	HUN	Services to Maitland, Telarah, Dungog, Singleton, Muswellbrook & Scone	

=== Light rail ===
Newcastle Light Rail services commenced on 17 February 2019 and operate from Newcastle Interchange through the Newcastle City Centre to Newcastle Beach.

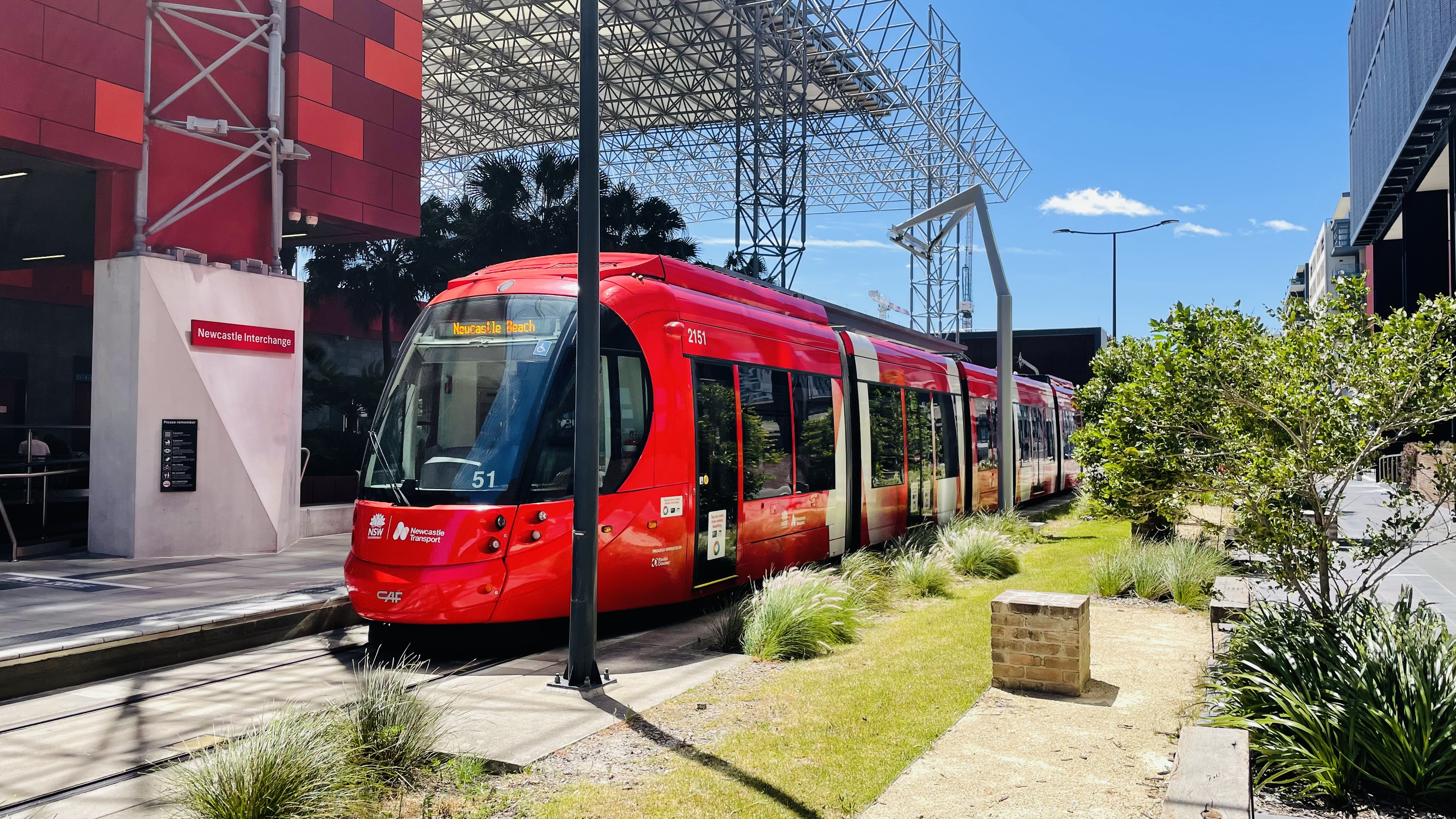

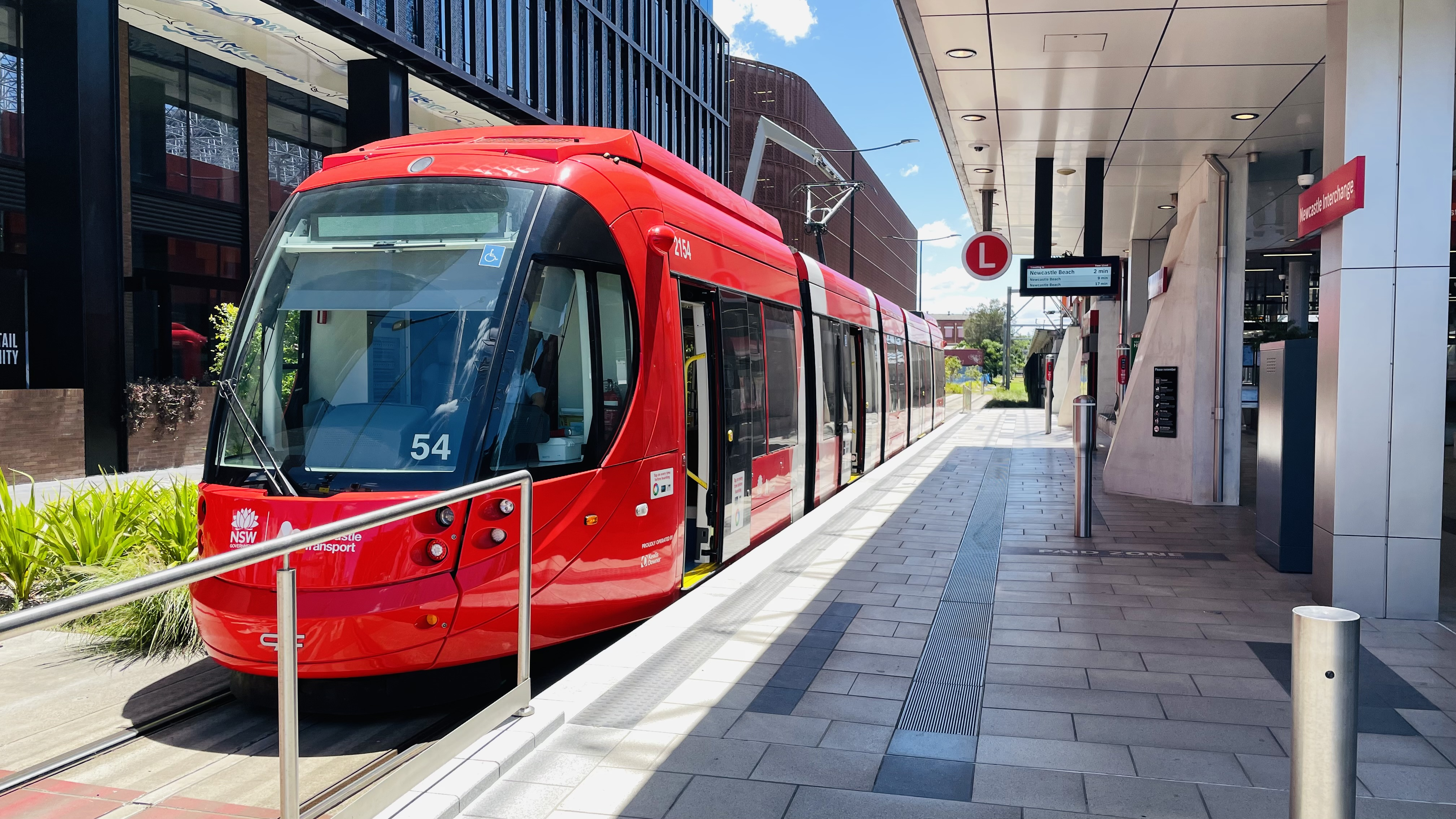

=== Bus ===
In September 2015, the former Newcastle & Suburban Co-Operative store building adjacent to the transport interchange was purchased as the site for a proposed bus interchange. Demolition commenced in June 2018 and the new bus interchange opened on 5 July 2020.

Stand A

- 10X to Charlestown Express (Weekdays only)
- 22 to Charlestown via Merewether & The Junction
- 130 to Newcastle Airport – Salamander Bay – Nelson Bay – Fingal Bay
- 131 to Newcastle Airport – Salamander Bay – Nelson Bay – Shoal Bay (Express, weekdays only)
- 138 to Salt Ash – Newcastle Airport – Fern Bay – Lemon Tree Passage
- 140 to Mayfield – Hexham – Tomago – Raymond Terrace
- 266 to Wallsend – Glendale – Edgeworth – West Wallsend – Seahampton

Stand B – Arrivals Only

Stand C

- 150 to Broadmeadow – Raymond Terrace – Karuah – Tea Gardens – Hawks Nest – Bulahdelah – Forster–Tuncurry – Taree
- 151 to Broadmeadow – Raymond Terrace – Bulahdelah – Forster – Taree
- 152 to Hexham – Raymond Terrace – Karuah – Tea Gardens – Hawks Nest
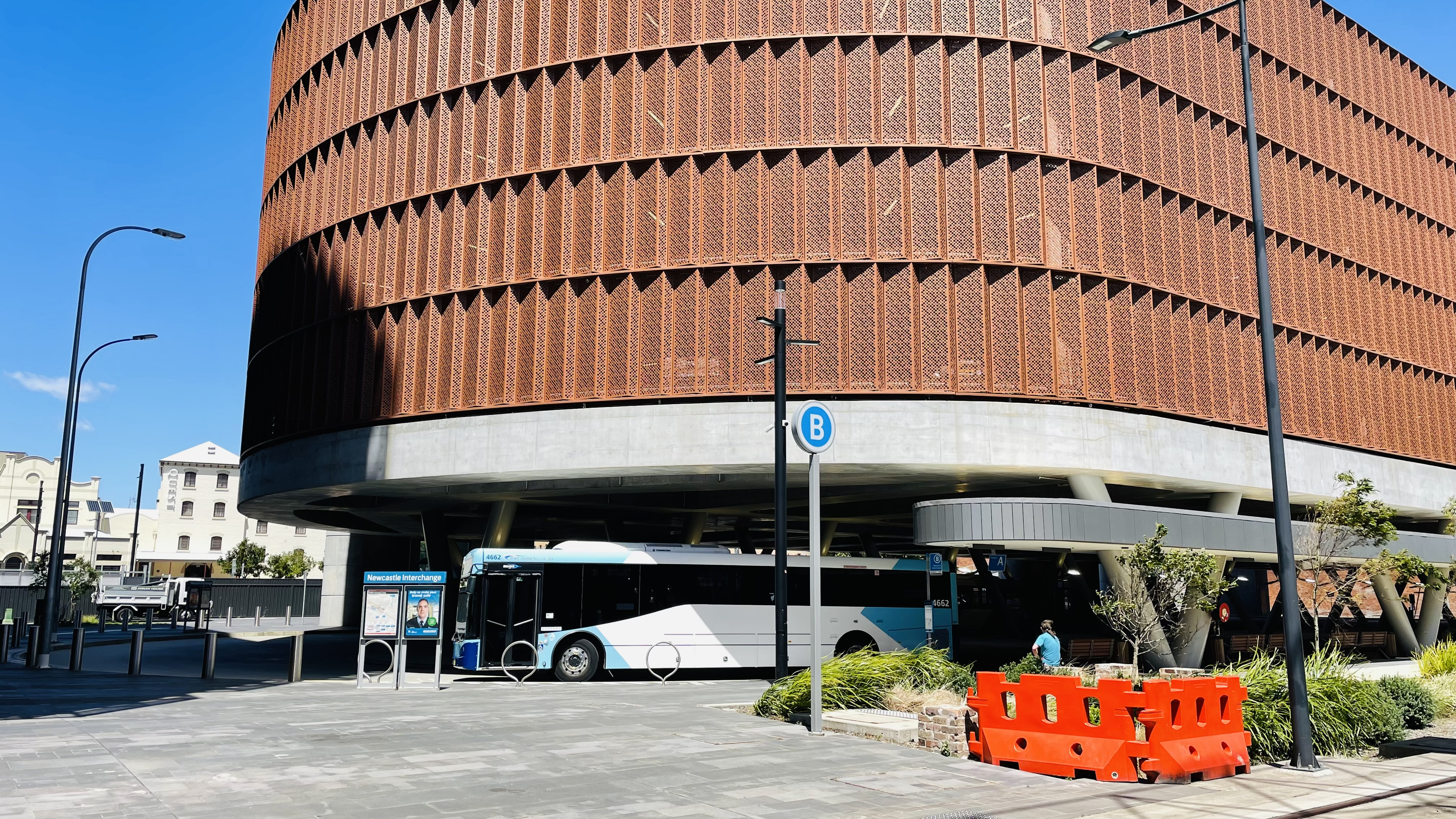

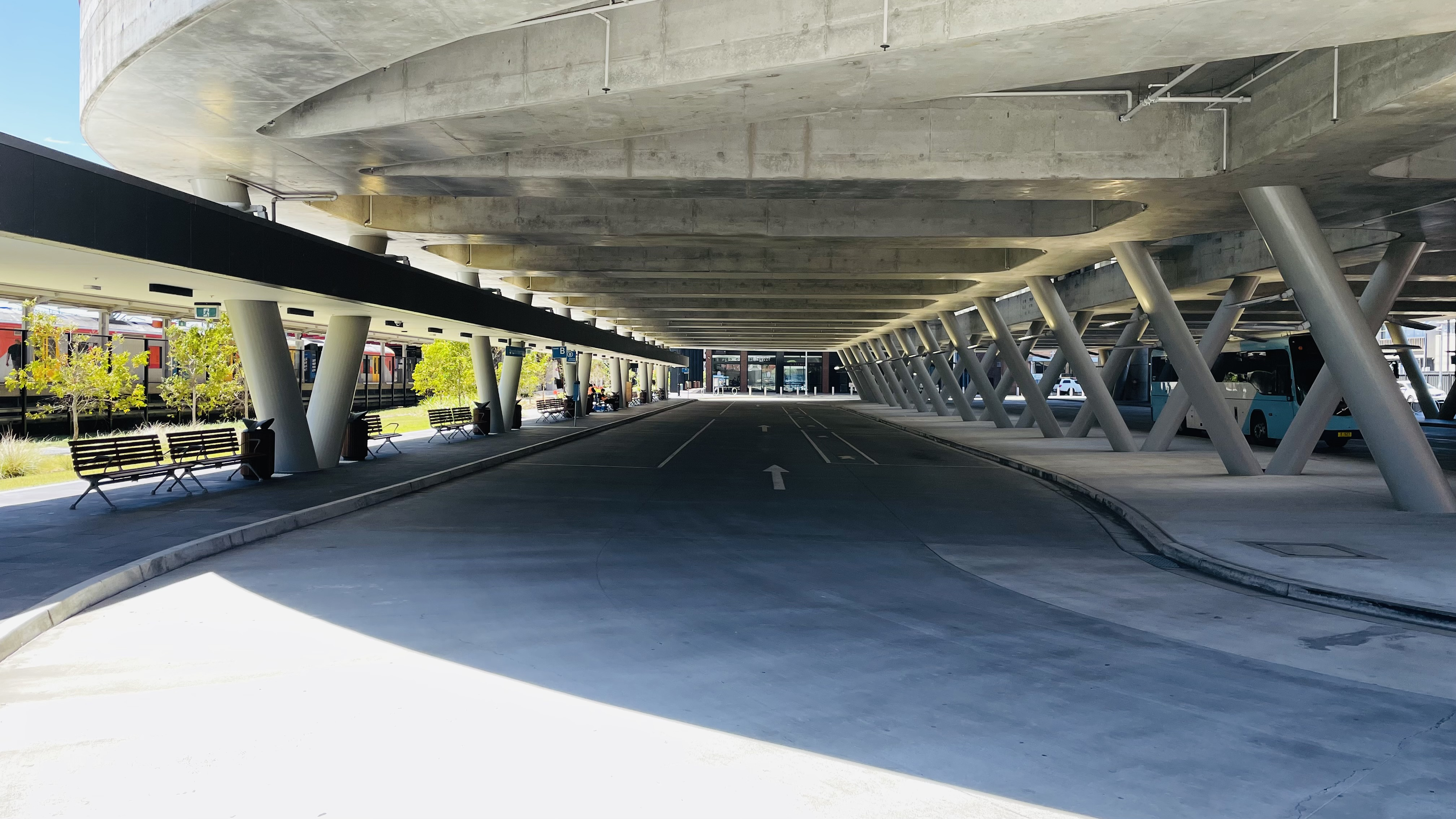
