= Telarah railway station =

Railway station in New South Wales, Australia

Telarah
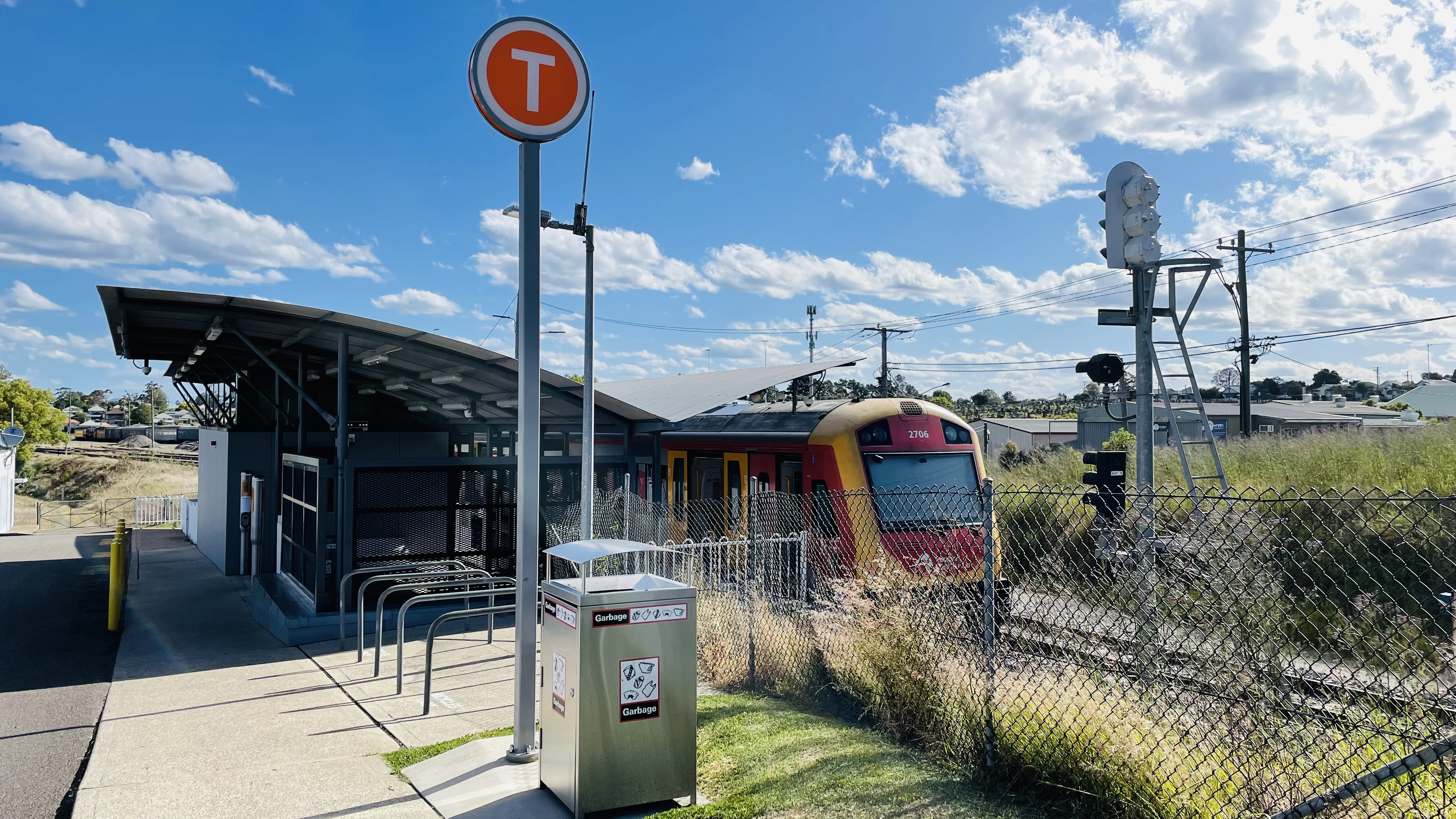
- Southbound view of Platform 1, November 2022

General information
- Location: Johnson Street, Telarah; Australia
- Coordinates: 32°43′24″S 151°32′23″E
- Owner: Transport Asset Manager of New South Wales
- Operator: Sydney Trains
- Line: North Coast
- Distance: 194.74 km (121.01 mi) from Central
- Platforms: 1
- Tracks: 2

Construction
- Structure type: Ground
- Accessible: Yes

Other information
- Status: Weekdays: Staffed: 5.45am–9.45am, 2pm–6pm: Weekends and public holidays: Staffed: Unstaffed
- Station code: TLR
- Website: Transport for NSW

History
- Opened: 14 August 1911; 115 years ago
- Former names: West Maitland Marshalling Yard (1911–1922)

Passengers
- 2025: 64,213 (year); 176 (daily) (Sydney Trains, NSW TrainLink)

Services
Preceding station	Intercity Trains	Following station
Mindaribba towards Dungog	Hunter Line	Maitland towards Newcastle Interchange
Terminus	Hunter Line	Maitland towards Newcastle Interchange
Paterson One-way operation	Hunter Line One weekday afternoon service	Maitland towards Newcastle Interchange
Location

Telarah railway station is located on the North Coast line in New South Wales, Australia. It serves the western Maitland suburb of Telarah. It is served by Sydney Trains Hunter Line services.

The station opened on 14 August 1911 as West Maitland Marshalling Yard before being renamed Telarah on 15 April 1922.

On 18 January 2018 a freight train derailed at the station on track 2; no one was injured.

== Platforms and services ==
Telarah consists of a single platform. It is serviced by Sydney Trains Hunter Line services from Newcastle. Most services terminate at Telarah with a limited number continuing to Dungog.

Just north of the station, the North Coast line becomes single track. Both lines from Maitland are signalled for bidirectional working with trains able to arrive or leave via either line. A disused freight yard is located south of the station. It is also north of the station where the North Coast Line and the Main North Line separate.

Platform	Line	Stopping pattern	Notes
1	HUN	services to Dungog & Newcastle	

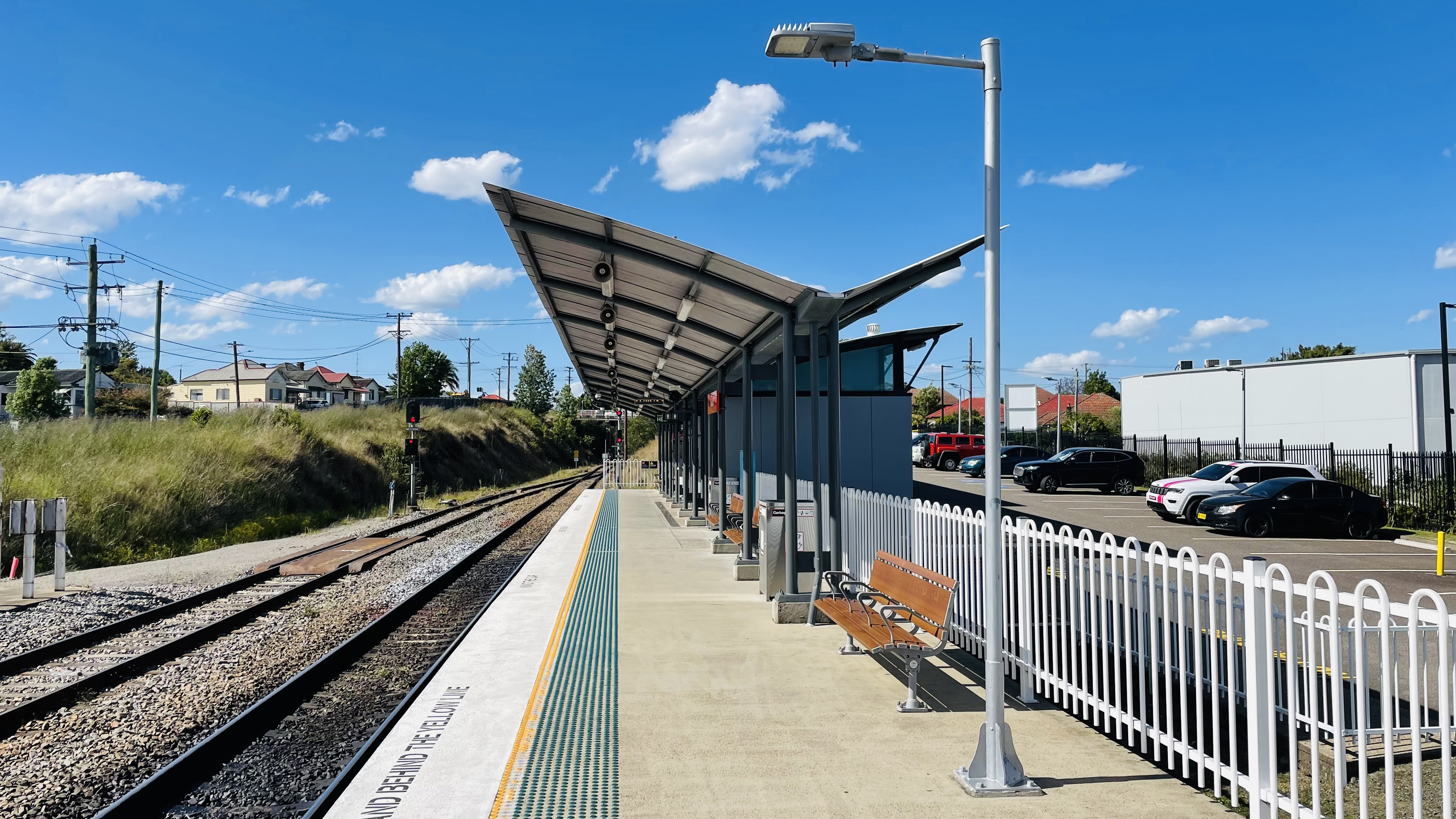
The single platform

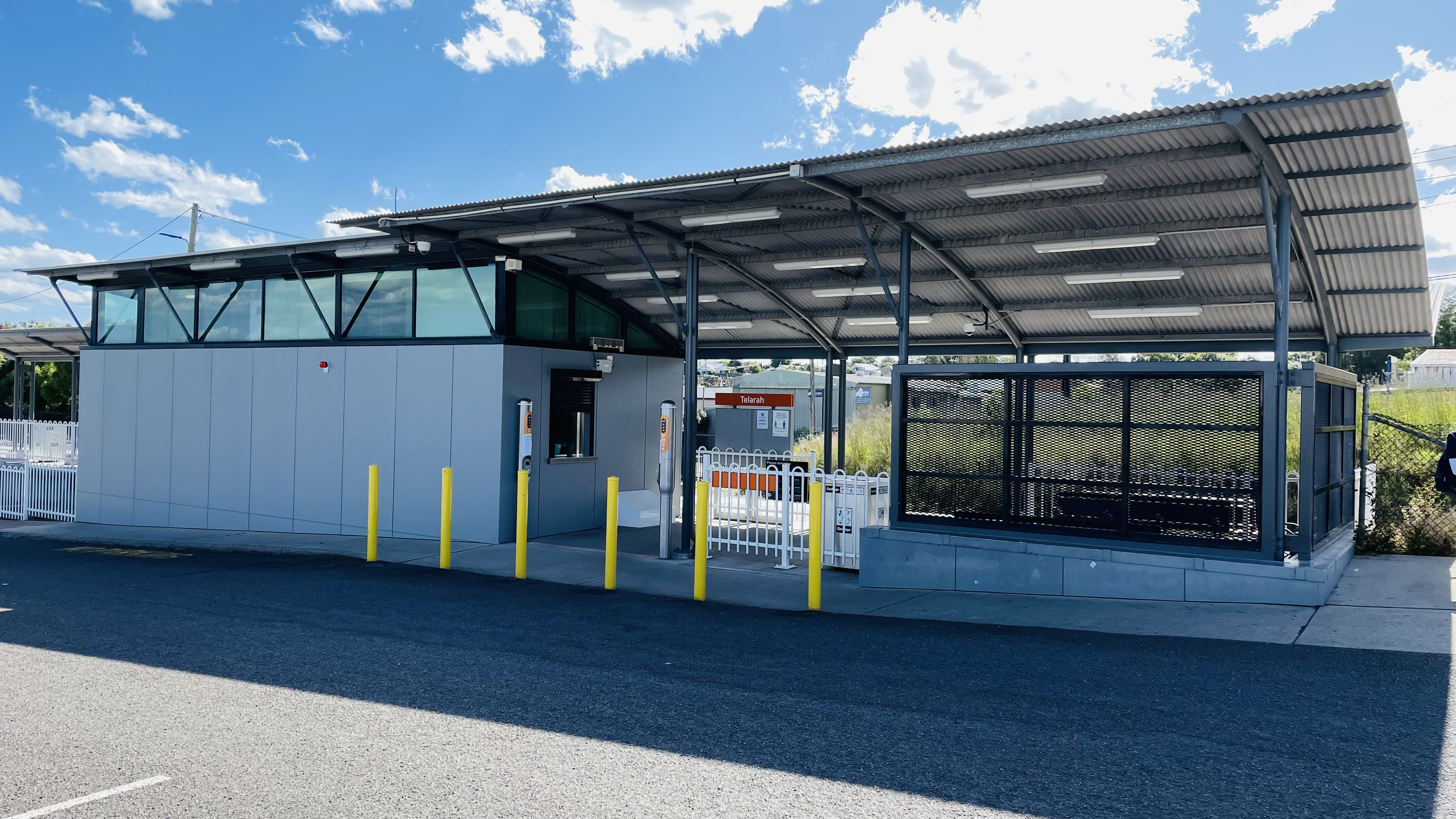
Station building
