= Newcastle railway station (disambiguation) =

Newcastle railway station, also known as Newcastle Central Station, is the main railway station in the city of Newcastle upon Tyne, England

Newcastle railway station may also refer to:

- Newcastle New Bridge Street railway station, another station in Newcastle upon Tyne, England, which closed in 1909
- Newcastle railway station (Northern Ireland), a former station in Newcastle, County Down
- Newcastle-under-Lyme railway station, a former station in Newcastle-under-Lyme, Staffordshire
- Newcastle railway station, New South Wales, which was the main railway station in the city of Newcastle, New South Wales, Australia; replaced by Newcastle Interchange
- Civic railway station, in Newcastle, New South Wales, originally called Newcastle Station
