= Wickham railway station, New South Wales =

Former railway station in New South Wales, Australia

Wickham
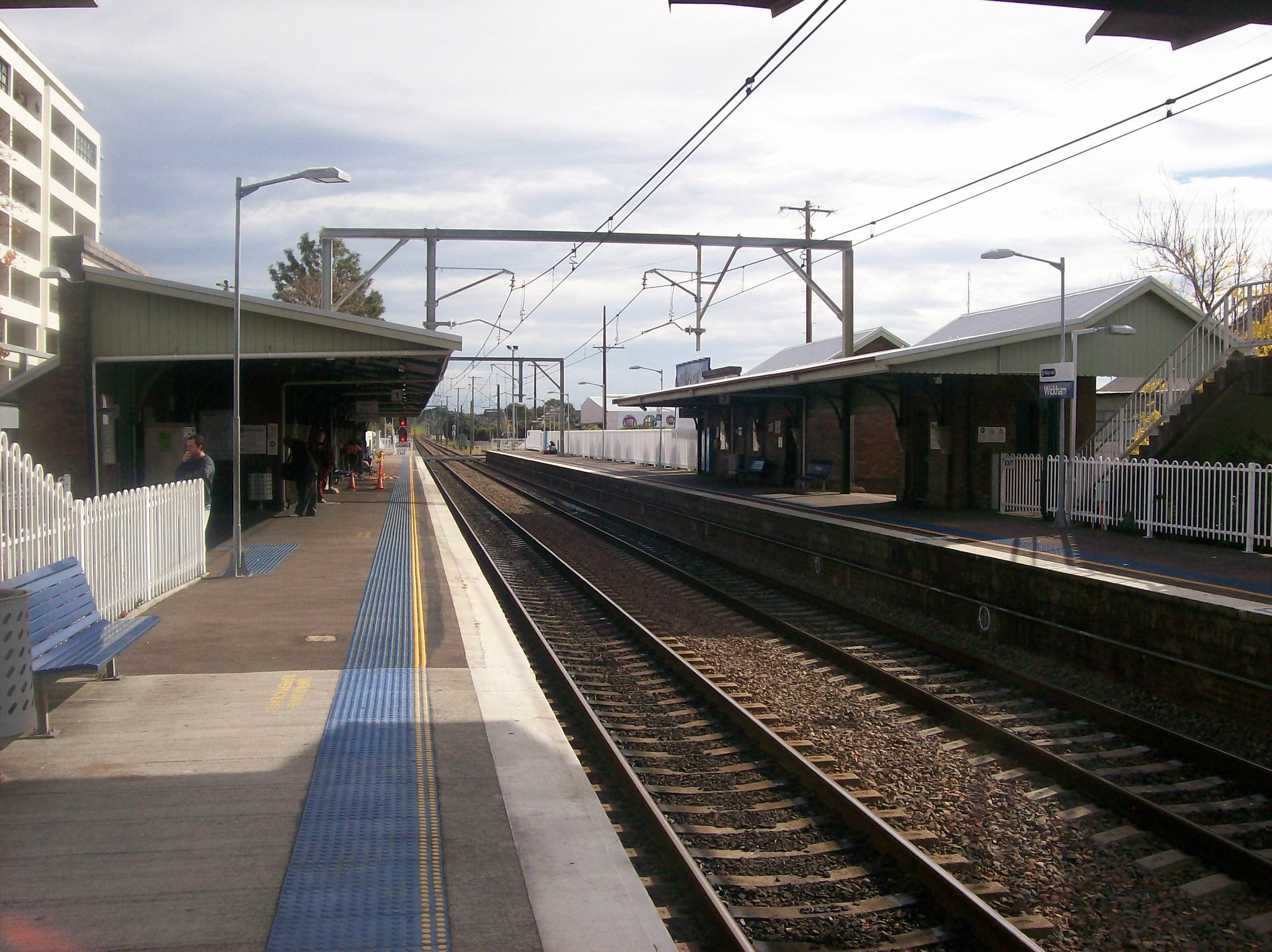
- Westbound view from Platform 1 in July 2013

General information
- Location: Beresford Street, Wickham; Australia
- Coordinates: 32°55′29″S 151°45′39″E
- Owner: Transport Asset Manager of New South Wales
- Line: Newcastle
- Distance: 165.93 kilometres from Central
- Platforms: 2 side
- Tracks: 2

Construction
- Structure type: Ground

Other information
- Station code: WKH
- Website: Sydney Trains

History
- Opened: 9 February 1936
- Closed: 25 December 2014

Passengers
- 2013: 580 (daily) (Sydney Trains, NSW TrainLink)
- Rank: 181
Location

Wickham railway station is a former railway station which was located in the Newcastle suburb of Wickham, New South Wales. Situated on the Newcastle railway line, it was serviced by Central Coast & Newcastle Line and Hunter Line services until its closure. Wickham, along with Civic station, succeeded Honeysuckle station, which was closed in 1872, following its own replacement by Newcastle station. Following urban growth in the Newcastle region, both Wickham and Civic were opened to meet the growing demand for public transport in the region. The station's signal box, located at the station's western end at Stewart Avenue, was replaced in the 1960s with a building recognised as Australia's first television-equipped level crossing.

Plans to truncate the Newcastle railway line put the future of the station in doubt in the early 21st century, and despite upgrades to the station in 2007, a newly elected government in 2011 committed to the redevelopment of Newcastle's urban developments and public transport network, including the truncation of the Newcastle line past Stewart Avenue. The station was closed as a result, in December 2014, to make way for a redeveloped Wickham station and transport interchange, along with a new light rail network. The station structure was demolished in May 2017 to make way for the new light rail depot to be situated on the site.

== History ==
=== Background ===
Prior to Wickham and Civic stations, Honeysuckle railway station, which was located opposite Steel Street in Newcastle West (at 32°55′35″S 151°45′54″E), originally serviced areas west of the central business district. It was first built as the passenger service terminus of the Newcastle railway line, and opened as Newcastle railway station in March 1857. While the new railway line was originally built with the express purpose of assisting the sea ports in the city, the original Newcastle railway station proved to be not close enough to adequately serve the ports, and thus the railway was extended further east, with a brand new Newcastle station opening in March 1858 as the line's new passenger terminus, and the former Newcastle station being renamed Honeysuckle station. The station was later renamed Honeysuckle Point station, before it was ultimately closed in 1872 and another station, Hamilton, was opened two kilometres down the line towards the Main North railway line junction. While the station lay dormant for many years after its closure to passenger services, Honeysuckle was finally demolished in 1936, prior to the opening of Wickham and a year after the opening of Civic station, though the sandstone foundations of the platforms remained in place through to their rediscovery during excavations for the Newcastle Light Rail project in July 2016.

=== Opening and operations ===
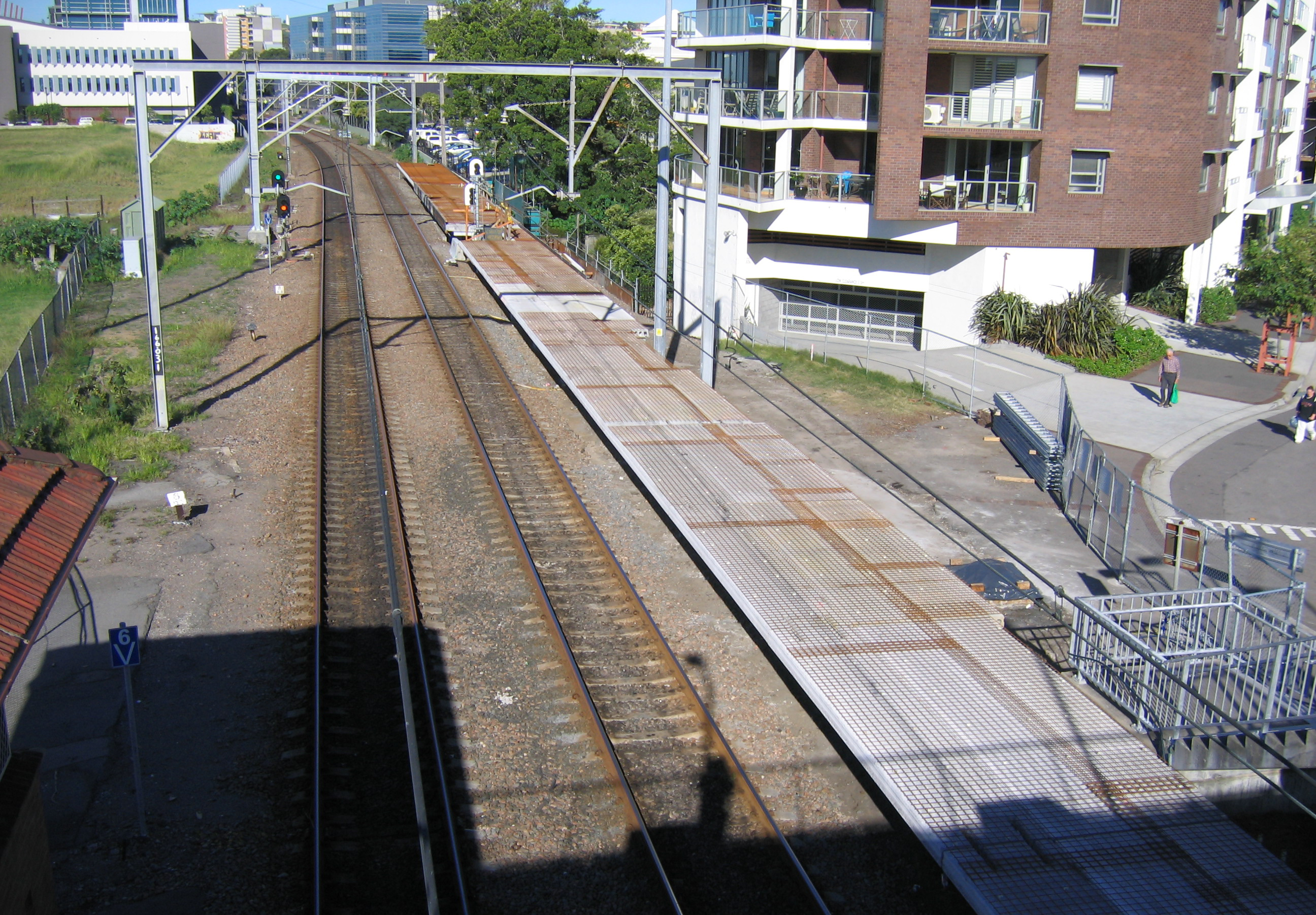
Extended 8-car platform at Wickham under construction in May 2007

In the years after Honeysuckle station's closure, Newcastle's population and urban development grew. As a response, two new stations on the Newcastle railway line were built, as Honeysuckle was demolished, to address the growing demand for transport – Civic, which was built around 600 metres to the east, and Wickham, which was built 400 metres to the west. Wickham station was opened on 9 February 1936, two months after Civic station was opened. The station housed an important signal box, located at the station's eastern end, which controlled the entire length of the Newcastle railway line from Newcastle to Hamilton, where the signal box at Hamilton Junction takes over. The original signal box was built in 1928, and replaced in 1965 with a two-storey fibro signal box that was recognised as Australia's first television-equipped level crossing, being equipped with a closed-circuit television link between the box and the level crossing at Stewart Avenue, located at the station's western end.

The station's structure remained largely the same for the rest of the 20th century. In 1992, a footbridge connecting the two platforms across the tracks, also located at the station's eastern end, was built, allowing access between the platforms. In 2007, a number of changes were made as part of the New South Wales Government's Newcastle Rail Corridor Project, a refurbishment campaign across the railway line designed to extend the life of the Newcastle railway line, described by contemporary media as a "backflip" for the Iemma Government, whom originally planned to close the line altogether. The changes included an extension of the station's southern platform to fit eight-car trains bound for Newcastle, new entrances to the station via the level crossing at Stewart Avenue, and an upgrade of the CCTV system at the crossing assisting the signal box.

=== Closure and redevelopment ===
The Newcastle railway line past Hamilton was closed on 25 December 2014, along with Wickham, Civic, and Newcastle stations. The decision by Transport for New South Wales under the O'Farrell Government, followed a decades-long public campaign to remove the rail line to allow open access to the Hunter River foreshore and to allow urban renewal projects to take place in the region. The cause, however, was not without controversy and opposition, with numerous efforts seeking to prevent the line's closure and removal. The station was demolished in May 2017 to make way for the light rail depot.

A new Newcastle Interchange opened to the west of Wickham station on 15 October 2017 as a terminus for the shortened Newcastle railway line and the Newcastle Light Rail.

== Design ==
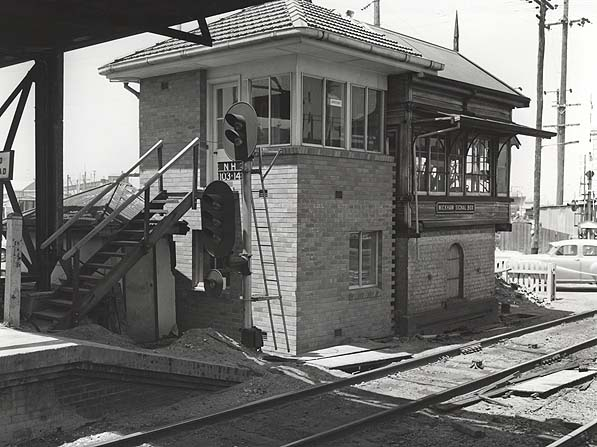
The signal box at Wickham during the 20th century; date taken unknown

The original Wickham railway station, opened in 1936, featured two side brick faced and asphalt-surface platforms, each able to fit four cars of a modern electric multiple unit train. Platform 1, the southern platform, serviced trains heading inbound to Newcastle, while Platform 2, the northern platform, serviced trains heading outbound from the city. In 2007, Platform 1 was extended eastward to accommodate a full eight-car set for Central Coast & Newcastle Line services. The station buildings, located at the centre of each platform, have been described by the New South Wales Office of Environment and Heritage as ones of a "Federation character", unique to Wickham and Civic stations, which were built much later than most other stations in the Hunter region. Inspectors from the Office of Environment and Heritage, evaluating the station in 2009, described the buildings as such

The building on platform 1... is of dark face brickwork and is relatively austere in detail, with simple timber framed windows and doors. The gabled roof is of corrugated iron and features timber valances to the awning. The eastern end of the station building is comprised of a brick wall with single opening and attached awning. The former ticket office retains its original ticket window with copper coin tray and original timber counter and drawers. Walls are painted rendered masonry with painted joinery. The room at the eastern end of the building has a concrete floor and is now used as a storeroom. [The ceiling] is angled on the southern side as a result of the room being enlarged at some date; the original use of this room is unclear.

— Office of Environment and Heritage

The station's original signal box, described as a "Type EO", was replaced with a "Type O" design signal box in 1966. Accessible from Station Street to the station's north, and through a metal staircase at the eastern end of Platform 2, the signal box was a two-storey high brick building, with a "terracotta tiled hipped roof and aluminium framed windows". The lower floor was primarily used for surveillance of the level crossing at Stewart Avenue, using a closed-circuit television link between the box and the level crossing. A precast reinforced concrete footbridge crossed the tracks at the station's eastern end, allowing easy access for commuters between the platforms. The footbridge is relatively modern, having been built in 1992, with access between the platforms in the 56 years previous only existing through the station's entrances on Beresford Street and Station Street, respectively.

== Services ==
The former Wickham railway station serviced CityRail, and later NSW TrainLink, Central Coast & Newcastle Line services to Newcastle on Platform 1 and to Central on Platform 2. Hunter Line services to Newcastle also departed from Platform 1, while services to Dungog and Scone departed from Platform 2.
