= Newcastle Light Rail =

Light rail system in New South Wales, Australia

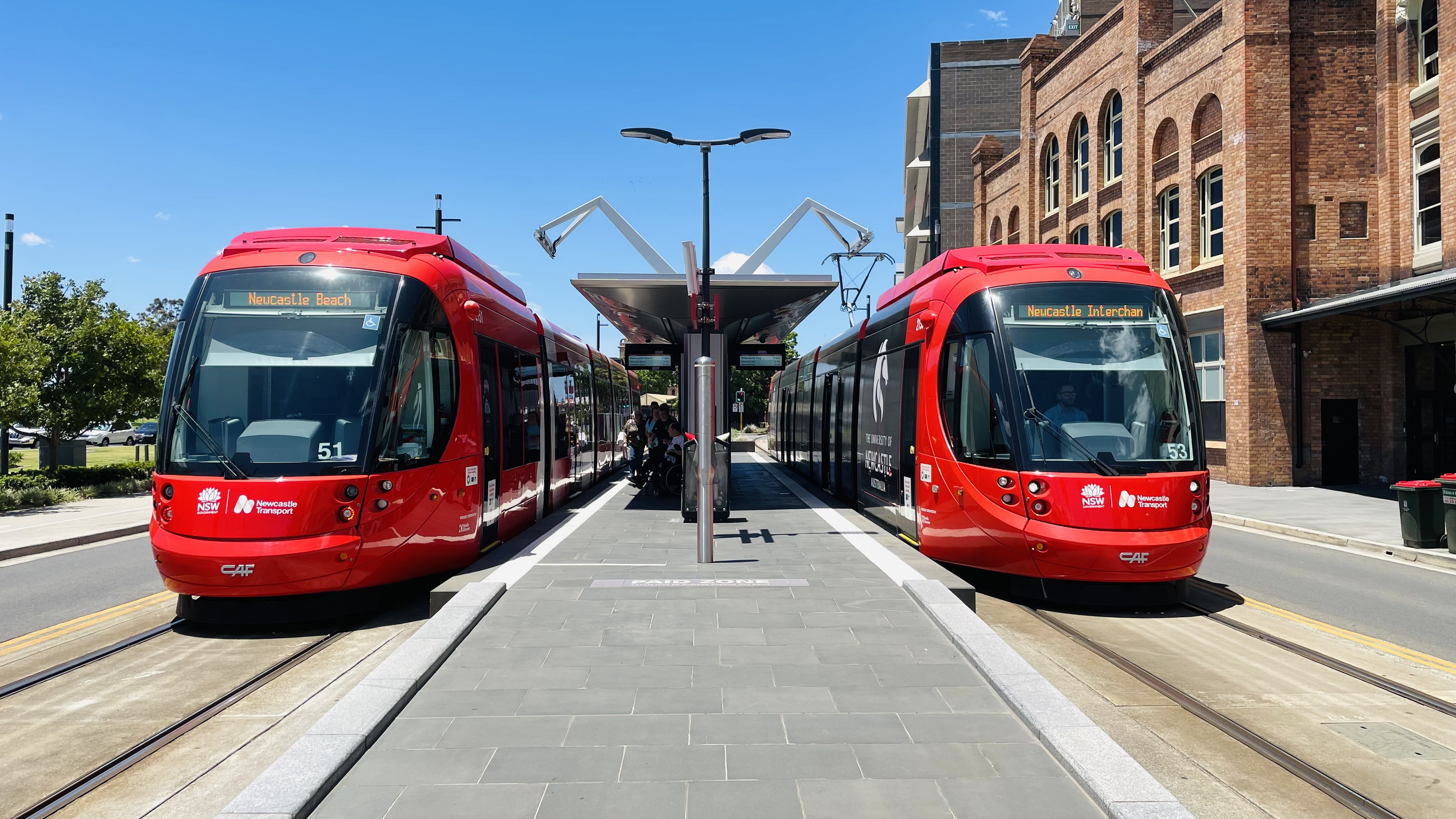
- CAF Urbos 100 vehicles at Queens Wharf stop

Overview
- Owner: Transport for NSW
- Locale: Newcastle, New South Wales
- Transit type: Light rail
- Number of lines: 1
- Line number: NLR
- Number of stops: 6
- Daily ridership: 2,883 (September 2023)
- Annual ridership: 679,105 (2022)
- Website: www.newcastletransport.info

Operation
- Began operation: 17 February 2019
- Operator: Newcastle Transport
- Character: At-grade street-running
- Number of vehicles: 2151–2156
- Train length: 32,966 mm (108 ft 1.9 in)

Technical
- System length: 2.7 km (1.7 mi)
- Track gauge: 1,435 mm (4 ft 8 1/2 in) standard gauge
- Electrification: 750 V DC overhead lines in depot, ACR chargers at stops

The Newcastle Light Rail is a light rail system in Newcastle, New South Wales, Australia, running from Newcastle Interchange through the central business district to Pacific Park. Major construction commenced in September 2017 and the line was opened on 17 February 2019. It is operated by Newcastle Transport for Transport for NSW.

== History ==
=== Trams ===
Newcastle first had trams from 1887 until 1950, when the final line, the Waratah line, was replaced by buses. At its peak, the system ran to Speers Point and West Wallsend. It was mostly served by trams of the LP design and rebuilds of the F-class trams from Sydney. Only a few, namely 154 and 284 are in preservation, with 154 being operational at the Sydney Tramway Museum. 284 is located at the Newcastle Museum.

=== Railway line ===
For decades, the Newcastle railway line had been seen by some as an impediment to the redevelopment of Newcastle's central business district with many proposals for its closure.

In December 2012, the Government of New South Wales announced its intention to close the line east of Wickham with the closure of Wickham, Civic and Newcastle stations. The line closed between Hamilton and Newcastle stations on 25 December 2014. A permanent terminus, Newcastle Interchange, was constructed adjacent to the former Wickham station and opened on 15 October 2017.

Two options were put forward for the light rail route – reusing the heavy rail corridor or using an on-street route. In May 2014, it was announced a light rail line would be built using a predominantly on-street route. About 500 m (1,640 ft) of the existing rail corridor east of Wickham station was reused before the light rail proceeded along Scott and Hunter streets to terminate at Pacific Park in Newcastle East.

The decision to use a predominantly on-street route drew mixed reactions and led to speculation that the railway corridor could be sold to property developers. It also went against the advice of Transport for NSW, which supported reusing the heavy rail corridor and advised the government that an on-street route could cost almost $100 million extra and deliver a slower service. In December 2014, the Government announced that Newcastle City Council would have the final say in determining any future development in the former rail corridor.

The replacement of the heavy rail line with light rail has also been controversial. Several newspapers campaigned to retain the heavy rail link. Newcastle City Council was initially supportive of the light rail project, but following a mayoral by-election in November 2014, the council advocated retaining the heavy rail line instead.

In December 2014, it was estimated that construction would commence in late 2015 but by January 2016 the date had slipped to the second half of 2016. In April 2016 it was stated that major construction would start in 2017 and be complete in 2019. The establishment of a site office commenced in February 2017. Major construction started around the middle of 2017.

In August 2015, Transport for NSW put out a tender for a technical advisor to assist in the development of this project. Registrations of interest for companies to design and construct the Newcastle Light Rail were called in January 2016.

A list of stops along the route was released in April 2016. Stops proposed were Newcastle Interchange, Honeysuckle, Civic, Crown Street, Market Street and Pacific Park. Each light rail vehicle will carry at least 100 passengers. In July 2018, an alternate list of names was published where Market Street could be Queens Wharf and Pacific Park could be Newcastle Beach.

In April 2016, CPB Contractors, Downer Group, John Holland, Laing O'Rourke and McConnell Dowell were shortlisted to bid for the contract to build the infrastructure. Downer was awarded the contract in August.

The government announced in April 2017 that the trams would use onboard energy storage technology to allow the majority of the line to operate without overhead wires. This differs from the approach used in the wire-free section of Sydney's CBD and South East Light Rail, which powers the trams via a proprietary ground-level power supply technology.

Construction of the light rail was completed by the end of September 2018. A free community open day for the public was held on 17 February 2019 with regular services commencing the next day.

When the Newcastle 500 Supercars Championship event took place in 2019 and 2023, services terminated at Queens Wharf; this was due to the Newcastle Beach stop being located inside the circuit.

== Operation ==
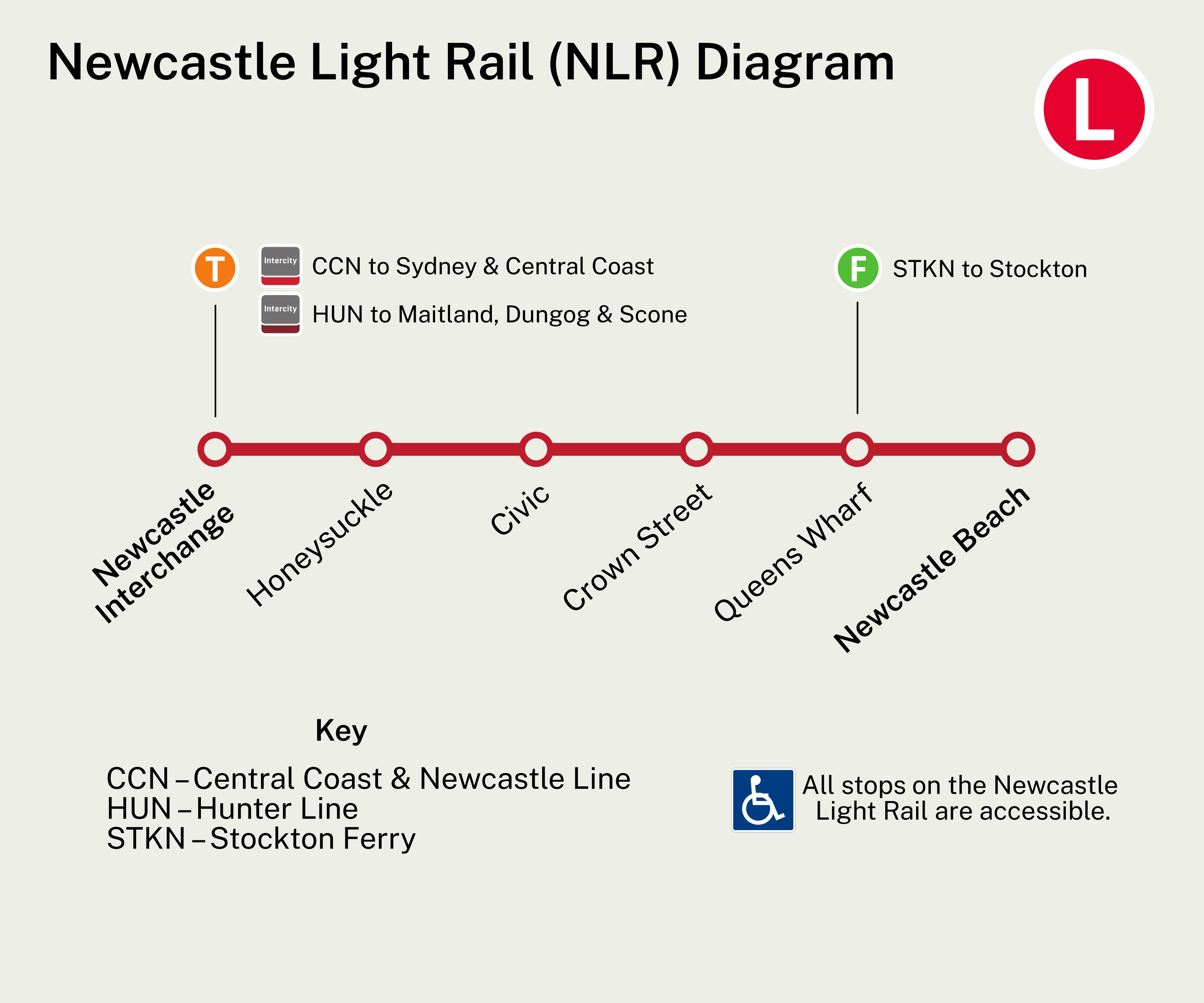
Diagram of Newcastle Light Rail

Services are operated by Newcastle Transport. A depot was built on the site of the former Wickham railway station.

=== Rolling stock ===
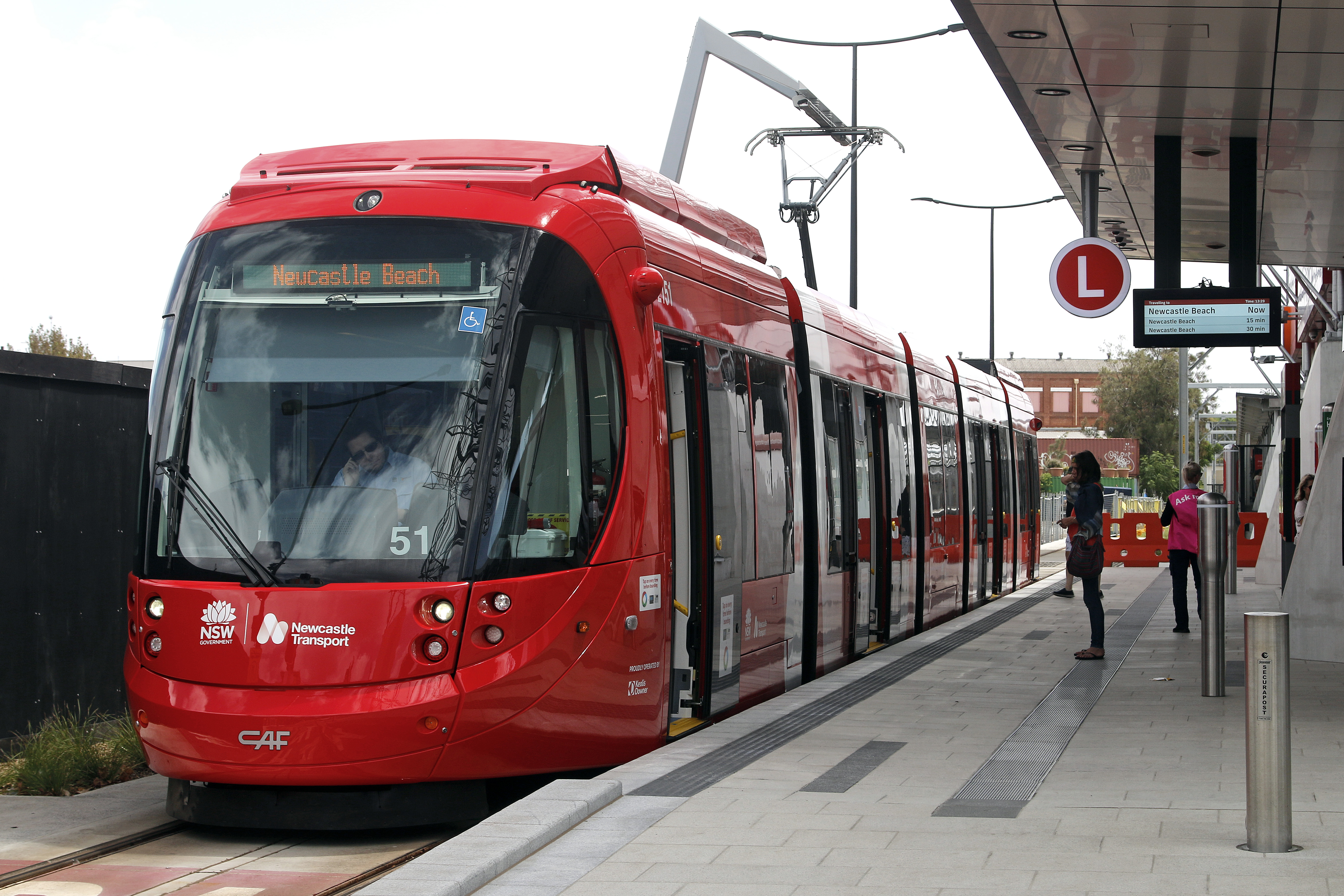
An Urbos 100 at the Newcastle Interchange

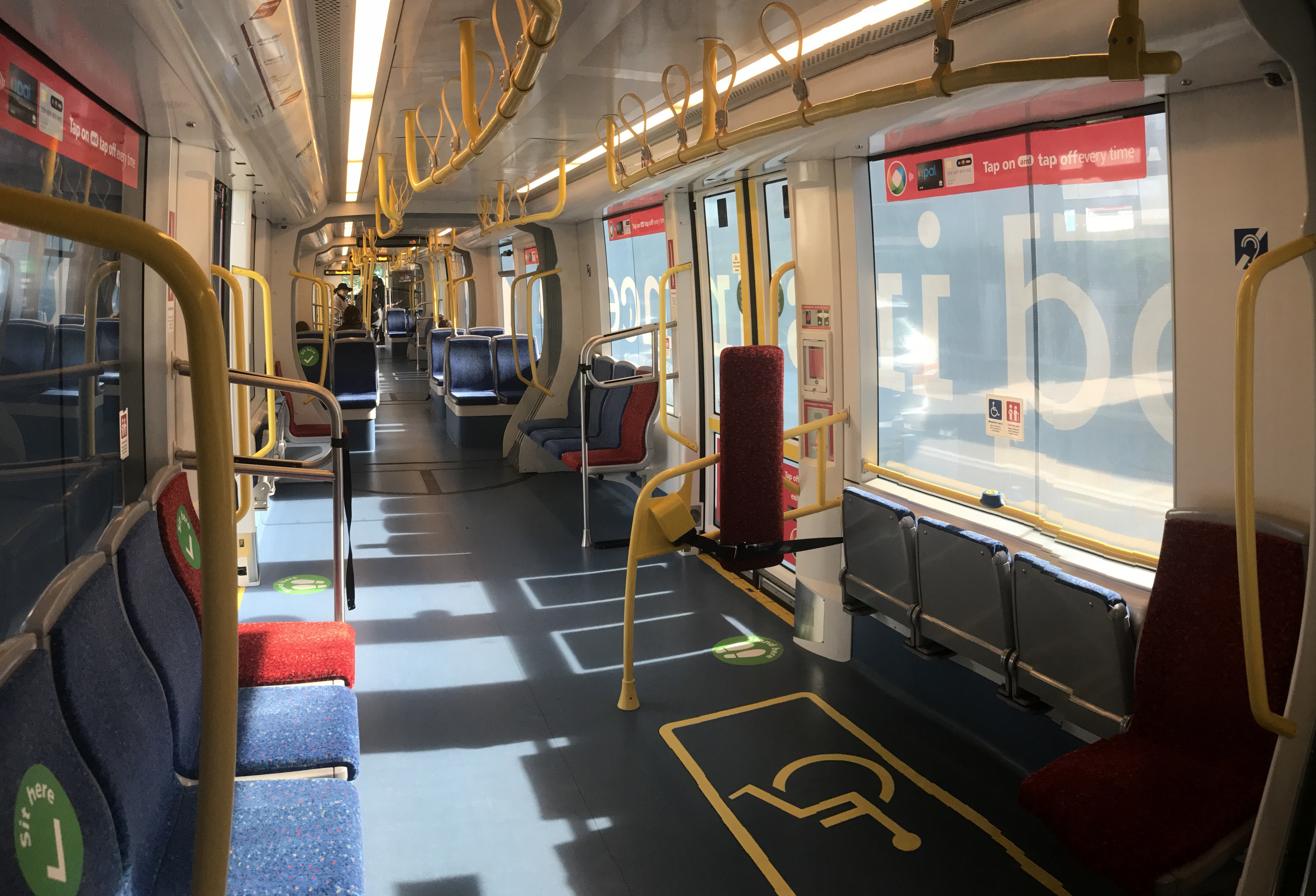
Interior

A fleet of six Urbos 100 trams operates the service. The trams consist of five modules and are 32.966 metres (108 ft 1.9 in) long. The trams were purchased by exercising an option under the rolling stock contract for Sydney's Inner West Light Rail. The Newcastle variant of the vehicles includes technology to enable wire-free operation, onboard surfboard racks and a different livery.

=== Frequency ===
On weekdays, trams operate every 7–8 minutes during and between the peaks, and 15 minutes in the early morning and evening.

On Saturdays, trams operate every 15 minutes from 7 am to midnight, and 30 minutes in the early morning.

On Sundays, trams operate every 15 minutes from 7 am to midnight, and 30 minutes in the early morning.

=== Stops ===
==== Newcastle Interchange ====
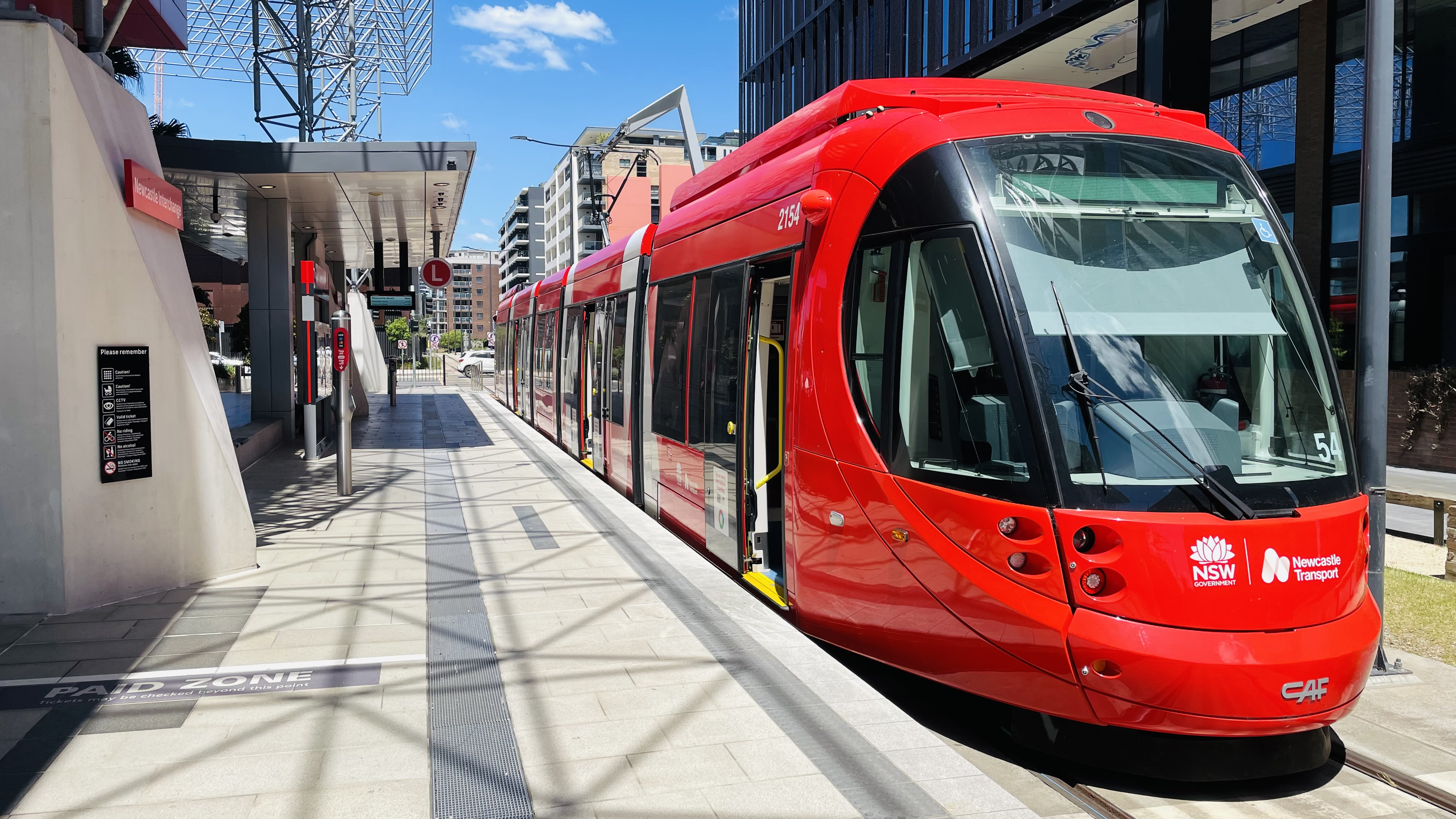
Newcastle Interchange

Newcastle Interchange is a transport interchange situated in the inner suburb of Wickham. It serves as the termini for NSW TrainLink's Central Coast & Newcastle Line and Hunter Line train services, Newcastle Light Rail services and several Newcastle Transport bus routes.

==== Honeysuckle ====
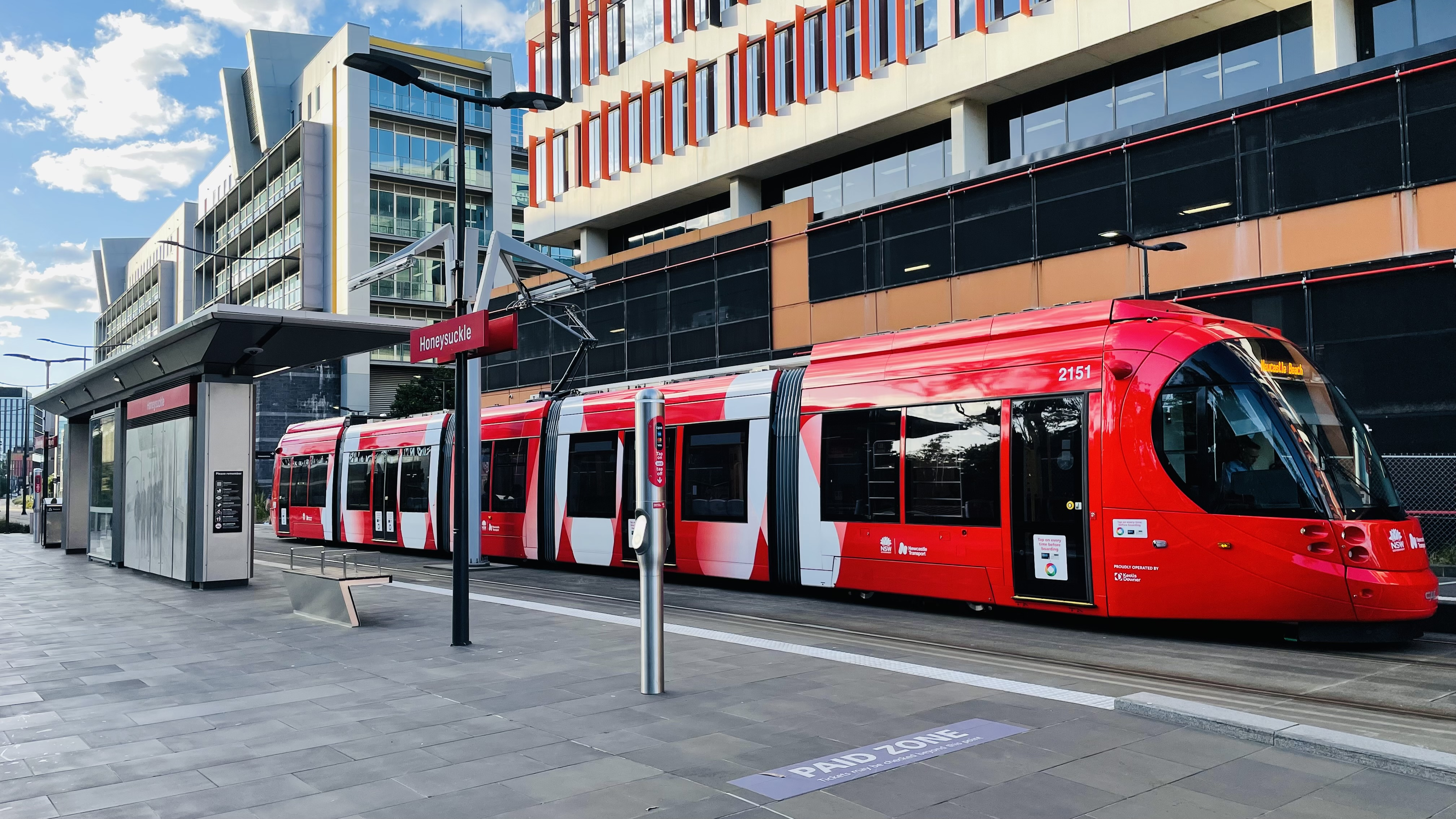
Honeysuckle stop

The Honeysuckle stop is located adjacent to Honeysuckle Drive and Hunter Street in the inner city suburb of Newcastle West. The new stop provides direct access to TAFE NSW (Hunter Street campus) as well as bus connections located not far from the station on Hunter Street.

Bus connections
Route number	Commences	Terminates
10X	Newcastle Interchange	Charlestown Square
11	Customs House, Newcastle	Charlestown Square
13	Customs House, Newcastle	Stockland Glendale

==== Civic ====
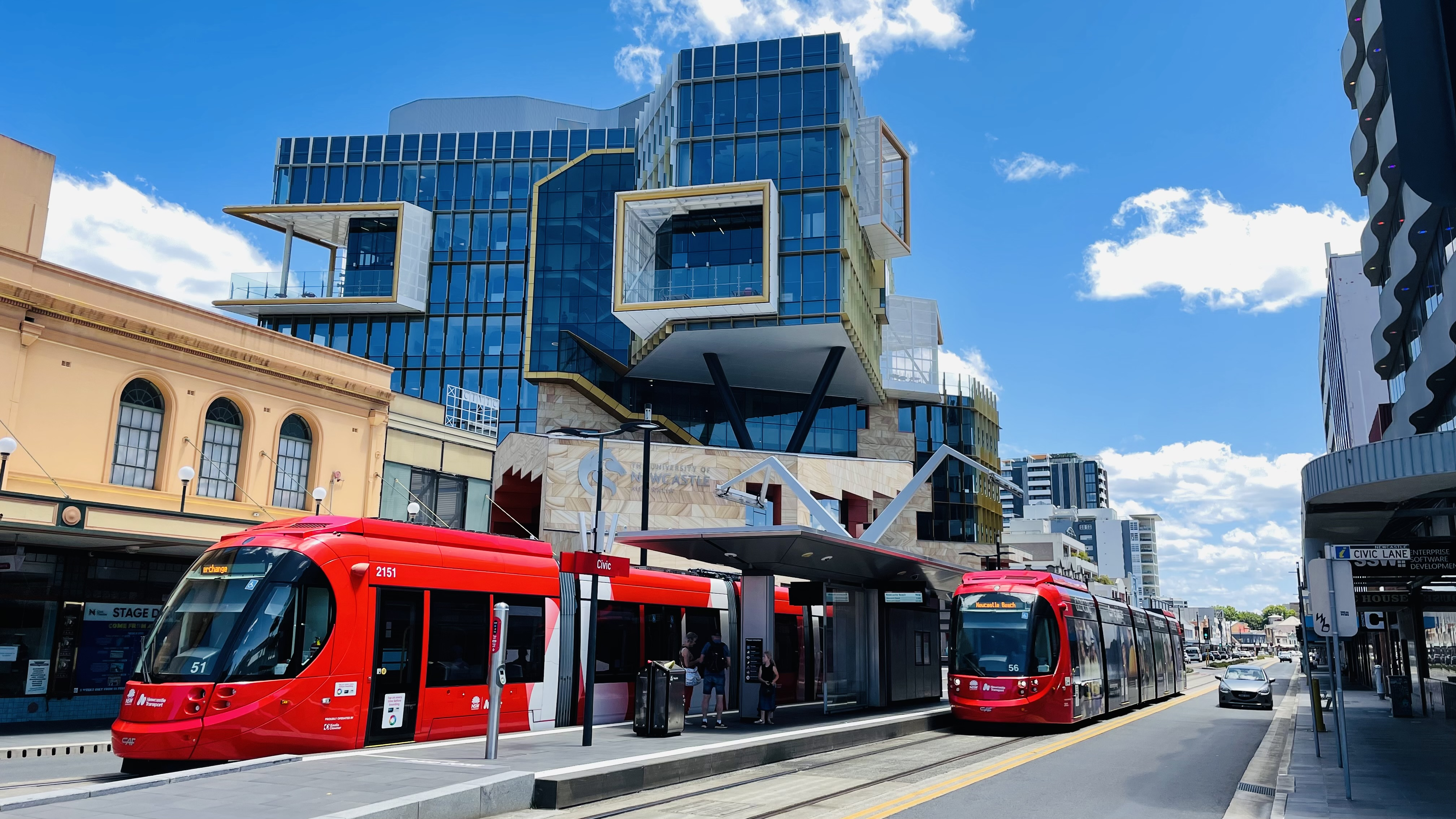
Civic stop

The Civic stop was constructed in front of the former Civic railway station on Hunter Street. The railway station was originally built in 1935 and was serviced by the Newcastle railway line until 2014 when it permanently closed as a railway station. The new light rail stop was built strategically in the geographical heart of Newcastle.

Civic Light rail stop is located on Hunter Street in the Newcastle CBD providing direct access to several inner-city attractions including Newcastle City Hall, Newcastle Museum and Newcastle Civic Park.

==== Crown Street ====
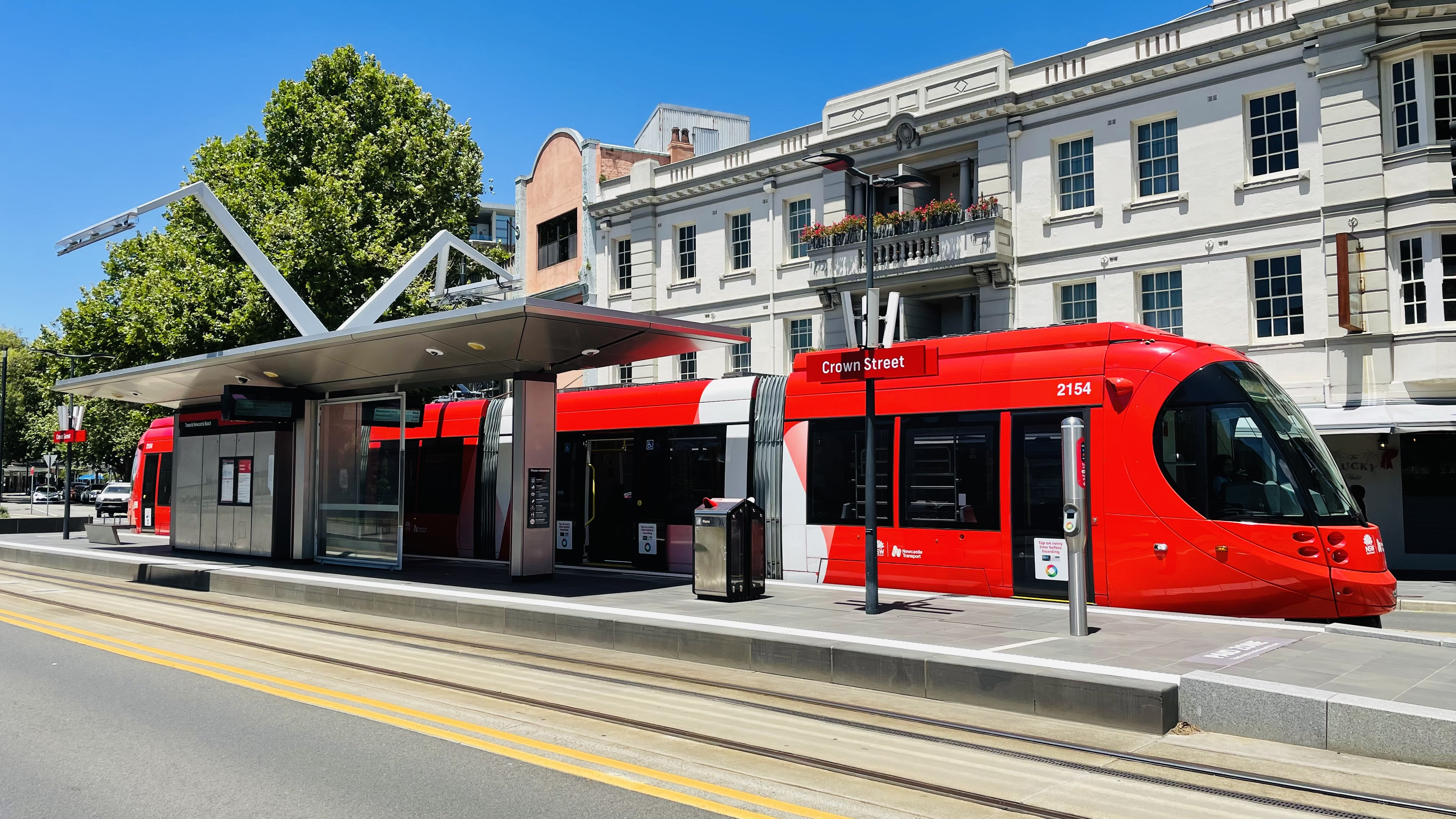
Crown Street stop

The Crown Street stop is located adjacent to the Hunter Street and Crown Street intersection in the Newcastle CBD precinct.

==== Queens Wharf ====
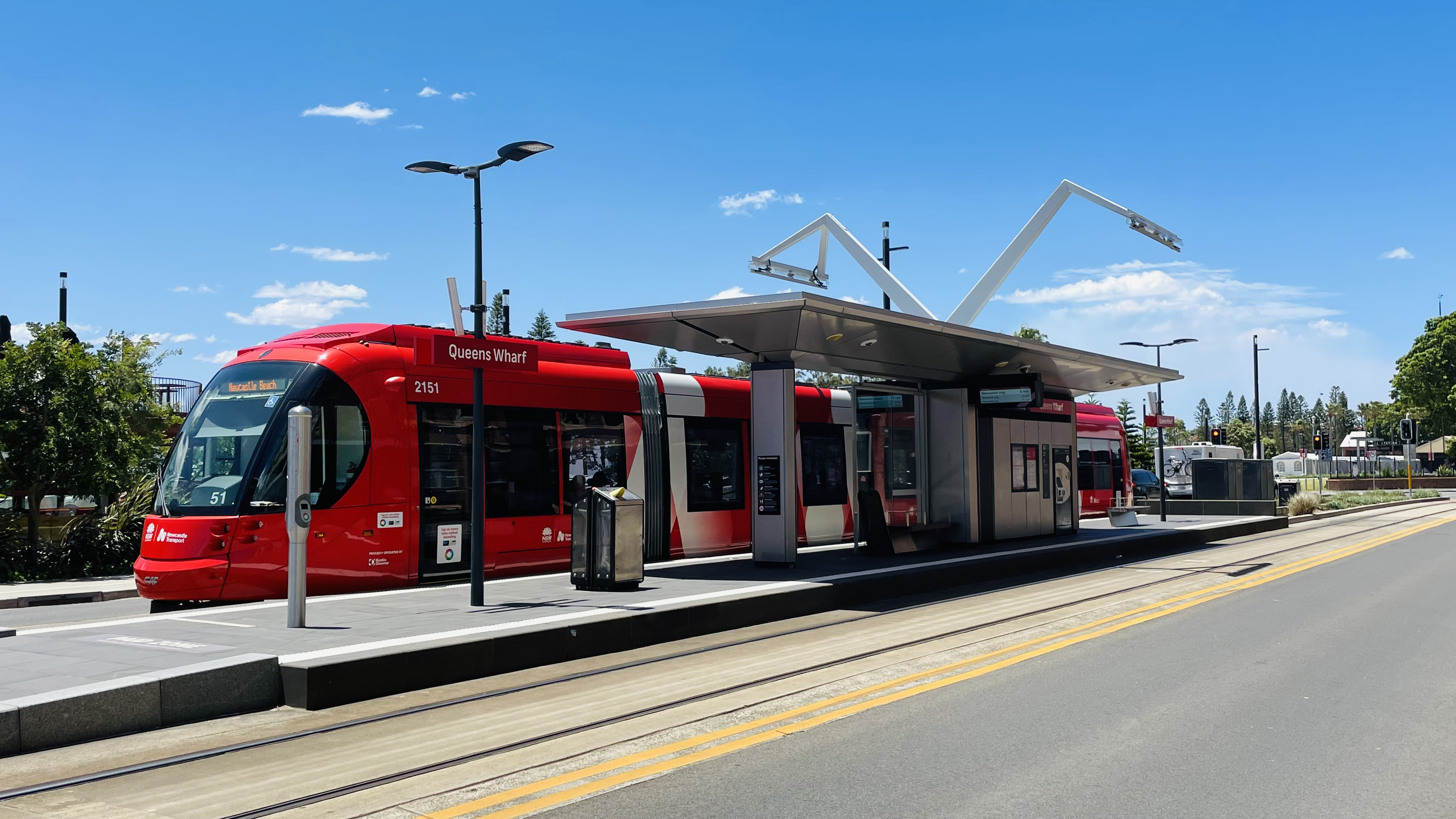
Queens Wharf stop

The Queens Wharf stop is located on Scott Street and provides access to the Market Street retail precinct and the Queens Wharf ferry terminal. The stop is also adjacent to the signal box that formerly served the Newcastle railway line.

See Queens Wharf for transport connections.

==== Newcastle Beach ====
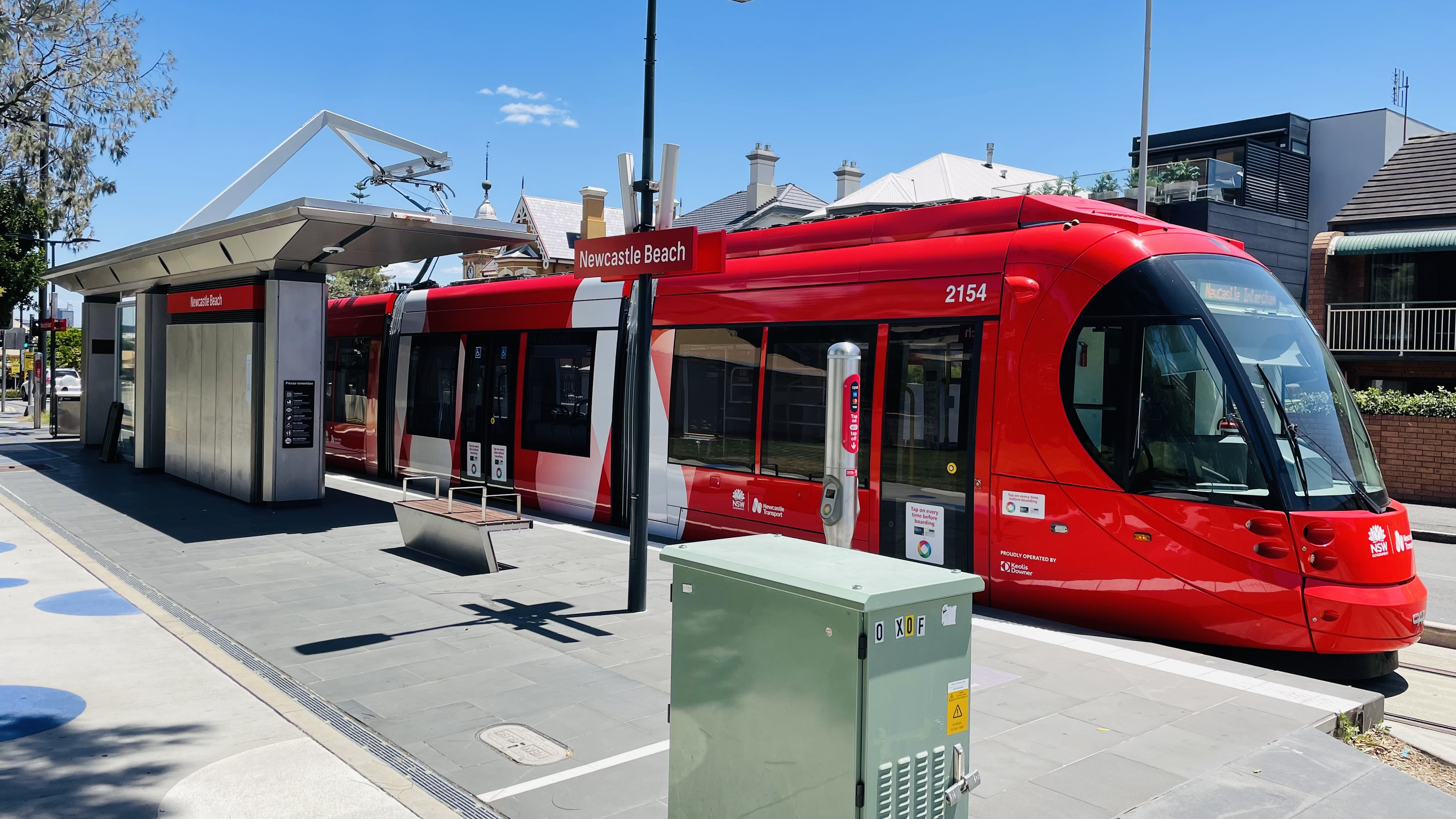
Newcastle Beach stop

The Newcastle Beach stop is located on the corner of Scott Street and Pacific Street, adjacent to Pacific Park in the inner-city suburb of Newcastle East. Other attractions nearby include Foreshore Park located on Wharf Road. It was initially to have been named Pacific Park.

== Potential extensions ==
Several options to extend the network were released in April 2016. The options were:

- Newcastle Interchange to Broadmeadow station
  - Broadmeadow station to Hunter Stadium
  - Broadmeadow station to Adamstown
- Newcastle Interchange to Mayfield

Other proposals made by the community include extensions to John Hunter Hospital, the University of Newcastle at Callaghan, Newcastle Airport, Glendale, Merewether and a CBD loop. Transport for NSW stated that these routes suffered from high costs and engineering challenges.

In March 2020, an updated report was released by Transport for NSW on the business case for the extension of the line. Media reporting identified that the "most suitable" route for an extension is from Newcastle Interchange to John Hunter Hospital, but that there was "no urgent need" to extend stage one following economic assessments.
