= Newcastle railway line =

Railway line in New South Wales, Australia

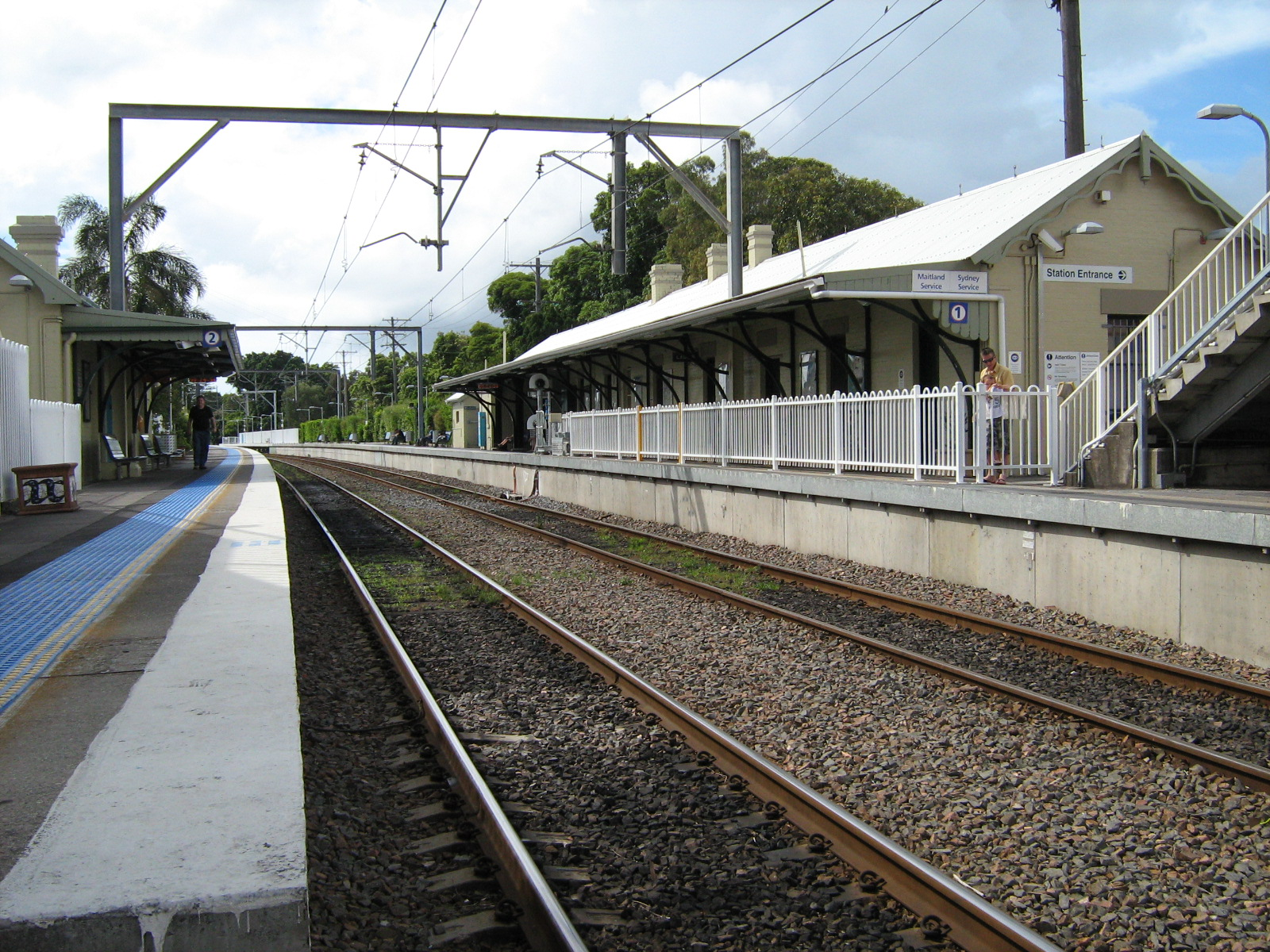
- Platform-level view of the Newcastle railway line as it runs through Hamilton

Overview
- Owner: Transport Asset Manager of New South Wales
- Locale: Newcastle
- Termini: Islington Junction; Newcastle Interchange
- Stations: 2

Service
- Operator: NSW TrainLink

History
- Opened: 1857

Technical
- Track length: 1.9 kilometres (1.2 mi)
- Num of tracks: Double track
- Track gauge: 1,435 mm (4 ft 8 1/2 in)
- Electrification: Overhead catenary: 1,500 V DC (heavy rail); 750 V DC (light rail)

The Newcastle railway line is a branch railway line in the city of Newcastle, New South Wales, Australia. The line branches off the Main North line at Broadmeadow and travels in an easterly direction through the inner suburbs to Newcastle Interchange, with one intermediate station at Hamilton. Until its curtailment in December 2014, it extended to Newcastle station. NSW TrainLink operates electric passenger train services over this line as part of its Central Coast & Newcastle Line service, and Hunter J set railcars to Maitland and beyond as part of the Hunter Line.

== History ==
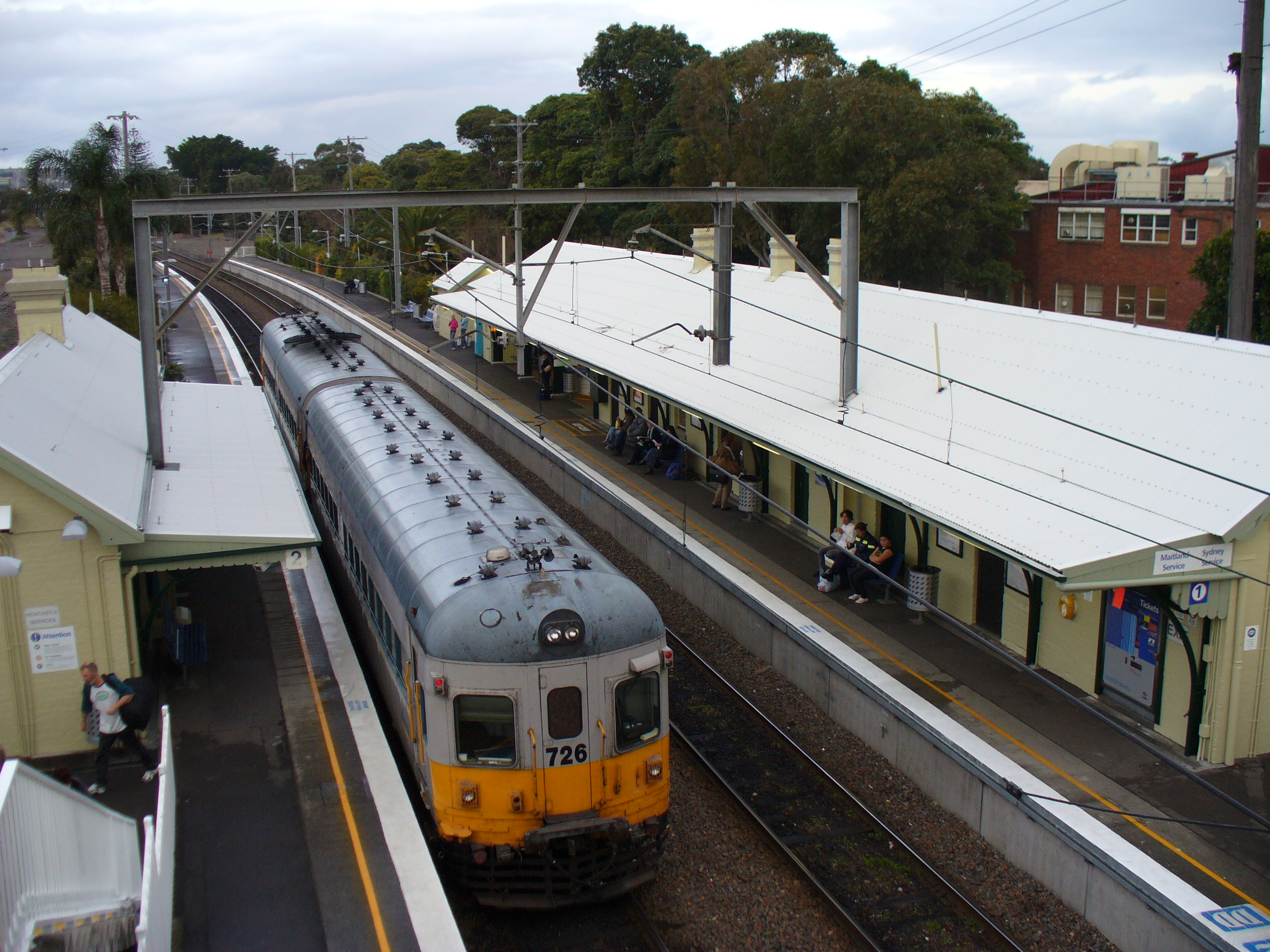
620/720 at Hamilton station in July 2006

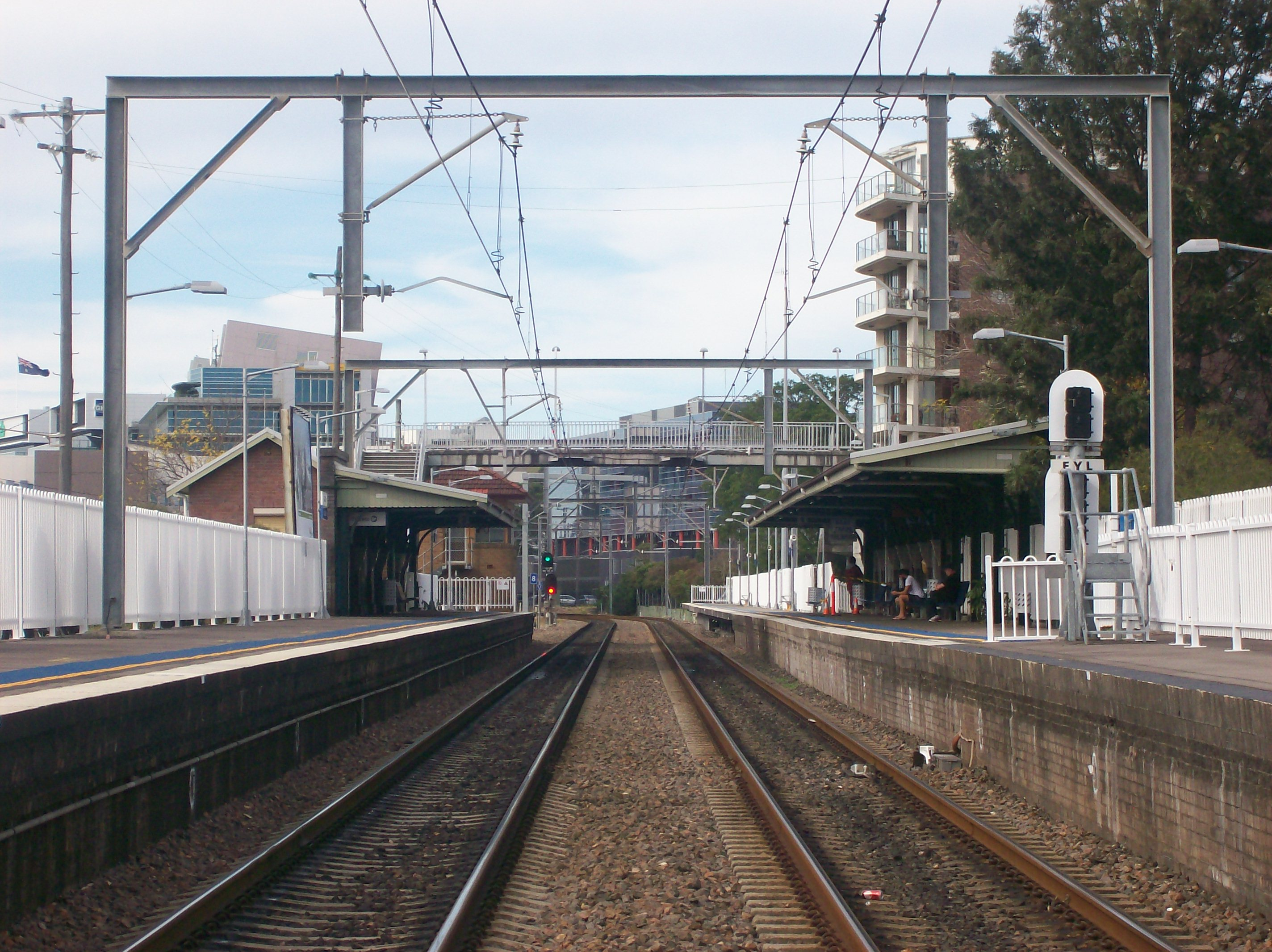
Former Wickham station in July 2013

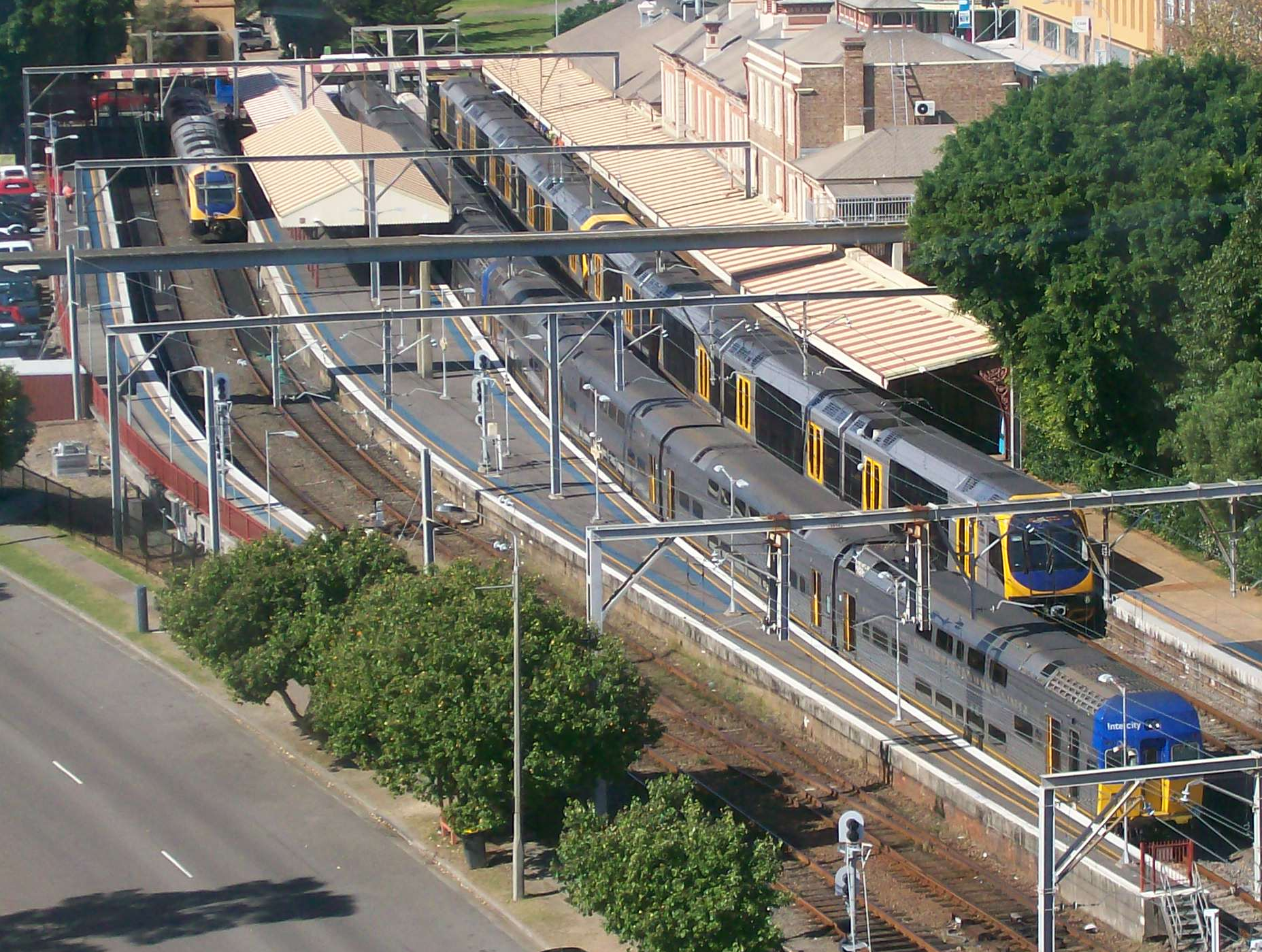
Former Newcastle station in December 2012

A line between Newcastle and the then much larger settlement at Maitland was first proposed in 1853 by the proponents of the original Sydney to Parramatta railway. The Hunter River Railway Company was formed later that year and the line was surveyed, however the private company failed and was bought out by the NSW government. Construction continued until the line opened in 1857. The line between Sydney and Newcastle was electrified in June 1984.

The terminus at Newcastle moved to various locations throughout the years, and has variously been named Honeysuckle and Honeysuckle Point. It was moved to its current alignment in 1872 and took the name of Newcastle in 1935 when Wickham and Civic stations opened. A mortuary station opened in 1883 to serve trains departing for Sandgate Cemetery. It closed on 1 April 1933. A large goods yard, the Newcastle Goods yard was constructed east of Newcastle station in 1858. This was closed in the late 1980s and redeveloped as a bus station and park land. The line was duplicated in 1864. The Main North line from Sydney connected at Hamilton Junction in 1887.

== Services ==
The Newcastle railway line as it appeared on NSW TrainLink Intercity maps in 2013–14, shortly before its partial closure.

Passenger and goods services were operated by steam haulage from inception. In 1961 the 620/720 class diesel railcars were introduced to provide local suburban service to Maitland on the Hunter line and south to Fassifern and Toronto on the Toronto branch line. Long haul trains to Sydney were operated by steam haulage until their final withdrawal from passenger services in 1971, and from freight trains in 1972.

In June 1984, the line was electrified when the electrification project from Wyong was completed and electrified local and long-distance services were introduced south to Sydney. Local services to Maitland and beyond continue to be served by diesel railcars. The introduction into service of the Endeavour railcarcars from 1994, and the Hunter railcars from 2006, allowed the final withdrawal of the long running 620/720 railcars.

== Partial closure ==
=== Closure proposals ===
A criticism of the line has been that it cuts Newcastle off from its own harbour foreshore with a number of proposals to close or at least pare it back. In November 1972, Minister for Transport Milton Morris announced the line would be cut back to Civic.

In 1990, CityRail proposed closing the line beyond Civic in response to a study on Newcastle's transport and development. As a proposed solution to this, since 2003 there had been studies to close the line and have Broadmeadow station become the major rail transport hub for the Newcastle region.

In 2005, there was a move pushed by business and property development interests to close the line with the proposal to redevelop the foreshore. This was widely criticised by among others Upper Hunter Region users, and former Deputy Prime Minister and rail enthusiast Tim Fischer. Originally the State Government had decided to close the line but later in 2006 and after a huge public outcry, Premier Morris Iemma announced that the line would stay open although in 2007 tenders were placed for a study into the line's future, including possible removal of the overhead wires and dieselisation of services.

=== Partial closure implementation ===
In December 2012, the New South Wales government announced the line east of Wickham would close to better connect the older CBD to the water front precinct of Honeysuckle. This resulted in the closure of Wickham, Civic and Newcastle stations.

The line closed between Hamilton and Newcastle stations on 25 December 2014, with the Hamilton to Wickham section reopened on 15 October 2017 when Newcastle Interchange was opened as the line's new terminus.

A short section of the corridor east of Wickham was incorporated into the Newcastle Light Rail, which generally follows a parallel route to the railway line along Hunter and Scott Streets and serves as its replacement.

=== Nile inquiry into Newcastle planning ===
The resignations in August 2014 of Tim Owen and Andrew Cornwell from the NSW Legislative Assembly and of Jeff McCloy from his post as Lord Mayor of Newcastle, came at a time of growing public concern that the decision to truncate the Newcastle railway had not been made properly. On 16 September 2014, the opposition and crossbench parties in the NSW Legislative Council successfully moved for a select committee to inquire into the planning process in Newcastle and the broader Hunter region.

The inquiry took over 370 submissions from official bodies and the public.

A substantial majority of the submissions opposed the Government's decision to close the railway. The inquiry held three public hearings in November 2014; some evidence was given of dealings with owners of land parcels near the railway who did not disclose their interests.

The chairman of the committee requested the NSW government to defer the railway's closure, scheduled for 25 December 2014, until his inquiry had considered the submissions and evidence and made its report. This request was denied.

On 18 December 2014, the inquiry released an interim report containing eight recommendations, including that no steps be taken to remove existing rail infrastructure until more planning work had been undertaken.

=== Court action ===
On 24 December 2014, the Save Our Rail (NSW) Inc group were granted an injunction by the Supreme Court of New South Wales preventing RailCorp from removing any part of line infrastructure after the closure of the line. RailCorp lodged an appeal. This did not affect the closure of the line, but if the appeal is unsuccessful, will require an Act of Parliament to formally close the line before work to remove infrastructure can commence.

=== Legislation ===
On 9 September 2015, the 'Transport Administration Amendment (Closure of Railway Line at Newcastle) Bill 2015' was introduced into the NSW parliament lower house by Transport Minister Andrew Constance. The bill was passed by the lower house on 16 September 2015 on party lines, and introduced to the upper house the same day by Roads Minister Duncan Gay.

The numbers in the upper house were not as certain, with the balance of power held by the Shooters and Fishers Party (two members), the Animal Justice Party (one member), the Christian Democratic Party (Australia) (two members), and the Greens New South Wales (five members). The government needed just two votes of these members for the bill to pass, and on 14 October the final votes were taken, achieving the support of the two Shooters, Robert Borsak and Rob Brown.

The bill was assented to by the Governor of New South Wales on 22 October 2015, and so became an Act.

The Act did not seek to amend the Transport Administration Act itself, merely to provide enabling legislation for the railway line from Railway Street, Wickham to the former Newcastle station to be removed. It did however contain retrospective legislation declaring that all work previously carried out was deemed authorised by the Act.

The legislation essentially made the Save Our Rail injunction moot, as the injunction was granted on the basis that rail infrastructure could not be removed without an Act of Parliament. The track and associated overhead wiring and stanchions were removed in early 2016, except within Newcastle station.
