= Newcastle railway station, New South Wales =

Historic site in New South Wales, Australia

Newcastle
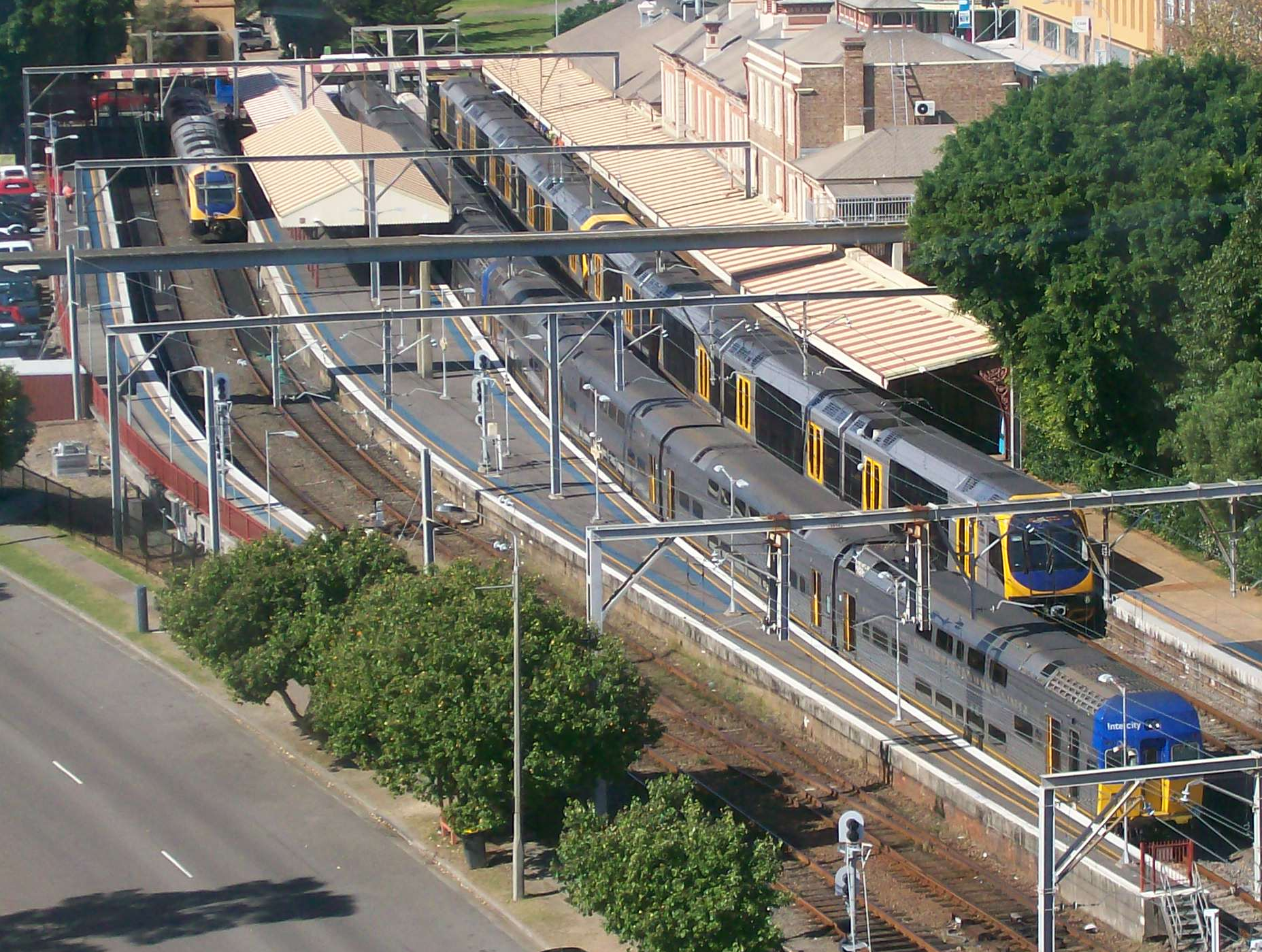
- Station in May 2012

General information
- Location: Corner Scott & Watt Streets, Newcastle; Australia
- Coordinates: 32°55′35″S 151°47′01″E
- Owner: Transport Asset Manager of New South Wales
- Operator: NSW TrainLink
- Line: Newcastle
- Distance: 168.10 km (104.45 mi) from Central
- Platforms: 4 (2 side, 1 island)
- Tracks: 4

Construction
- Structure type: Ground
- Accessible: Yes

Other information
- Status: Closed
- Station code: NTL
- Website: Sydney Trains

History
- Opened: 9 March 1858
- Closed: 25 December 2014
- Rebuilt: 1878

Passengers
- 2013: 1,150 (daily) (Sydney Trains, NSW TrainLink)
- Rank: 150
- Building details
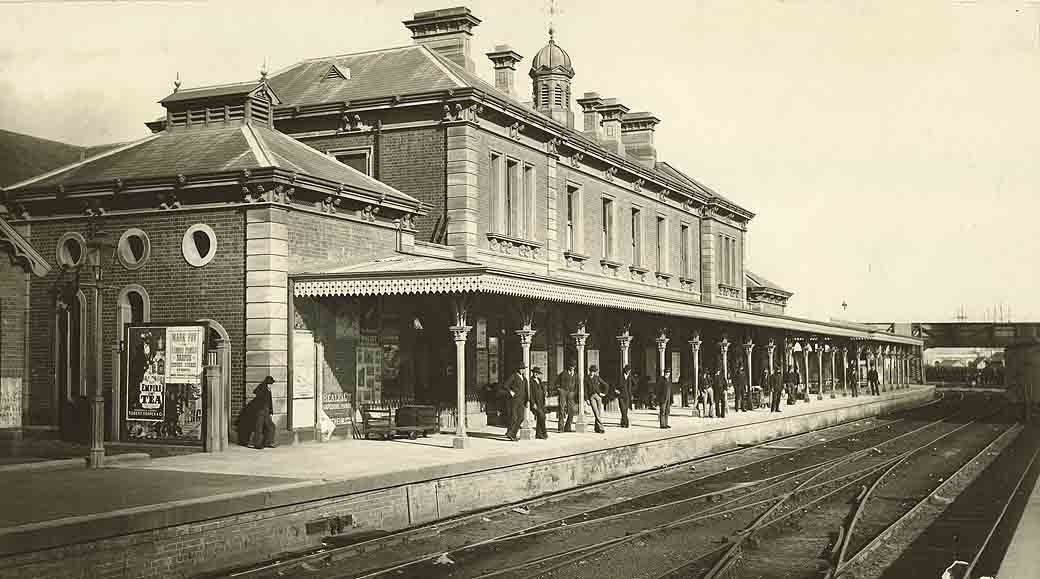
- Newcastle railway station, in 1884

Design and construction
- Architect: John Whitton

New South Wales Heritage Register
- Official name: Newcastle Railway Station
- Designated: 2 April 1999
- Reference no.: 00236
Location

Newcastle railway station is a heritage-listed former railway station located on the Newcastle line, serving the Hunter Valley city of Newcastle. It was the main railway station and terminus station prior to the curtailment of the Newcastle railway line.

The current railway station structure was built in 1878 under the direction of John Whitton and was listed on the New South Wales State Heritage Register on 2 April 1999, with additional workshops and rail yards surrounding the station also added to the Register on the same day.

Newcastle station has remained in use since 2018 as a community hub named The Station.

== History ==
Newcastle station was originally located at the site of the Honeysuckle Point Terminus. Early on in the making of the Honeysuckle Point Terminus, Newcastle residents called for an extension to the centre of town and in 1857, the parliamentary select committee recommended that a single line for goods and passenger traffic be laid from Honeysuckle Point to the wharf at Watt Street. In November 1857 a contract for £6,347, was awarded to William Wright for the 67 chains (1.3 km; 0.84 mi) extension. The station was located on a spur line which serviced Circular Wharf and was opened on Saturday 20 March 1858. The current station opened on 9 March 1858, replacing the temporary terminus on what later became Civic station. A large goods yard fanned east from the station, constructed in 1858.

With the connection of the original isolated Hunter Valley line to Sydney came the need for a new terminus. Under the supervision of John Whitton, Engineer in Chief of the NSW Government Railways, the new station was erected. The original building was constructed in 1878 and first used in December of that year. It consisted of a central two-storey building with single storey pavilions at either end. The ground floor housed a ticket office, waiting room, ladies room, parcels office and a stationmaster's office with administrative offices on the first floor. The pavilions on each end of the main building housed the men's lavatories and porter's accommodation. This new station was designed with a layout typical of NSW railway stations at that time (although was unique in being two-storey) and forms the basis of the station as it exists today.

By the late 19th century, the popularity of rail travel led to the extension and completion of Platform 2 in 1880, with the subsequent addition of a canopy in 1892 as well as a new parcels office and stationmaster's office. The areas previously occupied by these offices were converted into a dining room and bar. In 1897, a major renovations phase resulted in the demolition of the western pavilion and construction of the two-storey kitchen and staff block as well as the original single storey dining room used as a Railway Refreshment Room (RRR), the last major RRR built in the state. In addition a new single storey building was erected.

The last major phase of development occurred between 1923 and 1929. It was intended to construct a new building to improve accommodation at the station. This plan did not eventuate, but rather the replacement of the original Scott Street verandah by the current enclosed brick structure and the extension of the single dining room to three storeys. Most of the internal partitions and staircases were constructed during this time. The first floor of the 1878 building was converted to staff bedrooms, and a scullery and change rooms were added.

Further minor changes were made during the 1940s and 1950s and the last major works before closure occurred in 1980.

On 20 September 1987, the diesel multiple unit depot was relocated to Broadmeadow and later redeveloped as a bus station and park land.

On 14 December 2014, hundreds travelled to the city by train to make up the over 3,500 people who gathered at Pacific Park (cnr Hunter & Pacific Streets) to protest against the proposed truncation of the rail line.

On 24 December 2014, the Save Our Rail group were granted an injunction by the Supreme Court of New South Wales preventing RailCorp from removing any part of line infrastructure after the closure of the line. RailCorp lodged an appeal. This did not affect the suspension of services and, nonetheless, work to rip up Heavy rail trackage between Wickham and Newcastle stations in preparation for Newcastle Light Rail went ahead.

The last train departed Newcastle station for Gosford at 23:27 on 25 December 2014.

In September 2018, the Newcastle station precinct was reopened as a multipurpose community space branded as The Station.

In April 2026, the state government announced that they would partner with Ashbridge Capital to create opportunities for tourism, retail and hospitality at the old Newcastle station. Works are expected to begin in 2027, pending approvals.

== Description ==
The Newcastle railway station was built as a symmetrical row of five brick buildings (one and two storeys). The central booking hall is topped by a lantern and features cornered pavilions. The complex is united structurally by platform verandahs, supported on elaborate brackets, and visually by the common motifs of semi-circular windows, four-panel doors with overhead fanlights, frieze under eaves and the stone quoins/pilasters which define the corners of the buildings. The overall decorative effect is of a restrained Renaissance classicism resulting from the flat detailing. The buildings on either side of the Booking Hall have raised skylights which make interesting variations in the roofline of the complex. The one to the west on the roadside however, was converted into a three-storey hotel for a time and this addition has altered the original symmetry.

It was reported to be in good physical condition with low archaeological potential as at 30 September 1997.

== Platform and services ==
Newcastle Station consisted of four platforms, two of which were allocated for Central Coast & Newcastle Line services and two for Hunter Line services, although in practice all services could use any platform.

All four lines were electrified in 1984. A loop was maintained between platforms 1 and 2 until removed in 2012.

The station was also a major bus and coach interchange.

== Heritage listing ==
Historically the building reflects the phases of development of the state's second most important city over almost a century and a half, symbolises the expansion of rail into regional NSW and the completion of the major link in the opening up of the north of the state to rail travel. Aesthetically, the station is an example of the station type built for larger centres in NSW. Socially the buildings have a place in the social activity of Novocastrians over nearly a century and a half. Scientifically the site has potential to reveal information which could provide greater insight into the changing face of rail travel to the state's second major city, the changing face of its relationship with the harbour and the Honeysuckle Point Railway Workshops and the importance in the development of gas lighting in Newcastle City.

Newcastle railway station, New South Wales was listed on the New South Wales State Heritage Register on 2 April 1999 having satisfied the following criteria.

The place is important in demonstrating the course, or pattern, of cultural or natural history in New South Wales.

The building reflects the phases of development of the state's second most important city over almost a century and a half and symbolises the expansion of rail into regional NSW and the major link in the opening up of the north of the state to rail travel.

The place is important in demonstrating aesthetic characteristics and/or a high degree of creative or technical achievement in New South Wales.

The station is a fine example of the station type built for larger centres in NSW. It is a major example of one type of Victorian Station architecture and as a townscape element of part of the original civic and commercial centre.

The place has strong or special association with a particular community or cultural group in New South Wales for social, cultural or spiritual reasons.

The buildings have a unique place in the social activity of Novocastrians over nearly a century and a half.

The place has potential to yield information that will contribute to an understanding of the cultural or natural history of New South Wales.

The site has potential to reveal information which could provide greater insight into the changing face of rail travel to the state's second major city over more than a century, the changing face of its relationship with the harbour and the Honeysuckle Workshops and the importance in the development of gas lighting in Newcastle City.

== Gallery ==
=== Station in operation ===
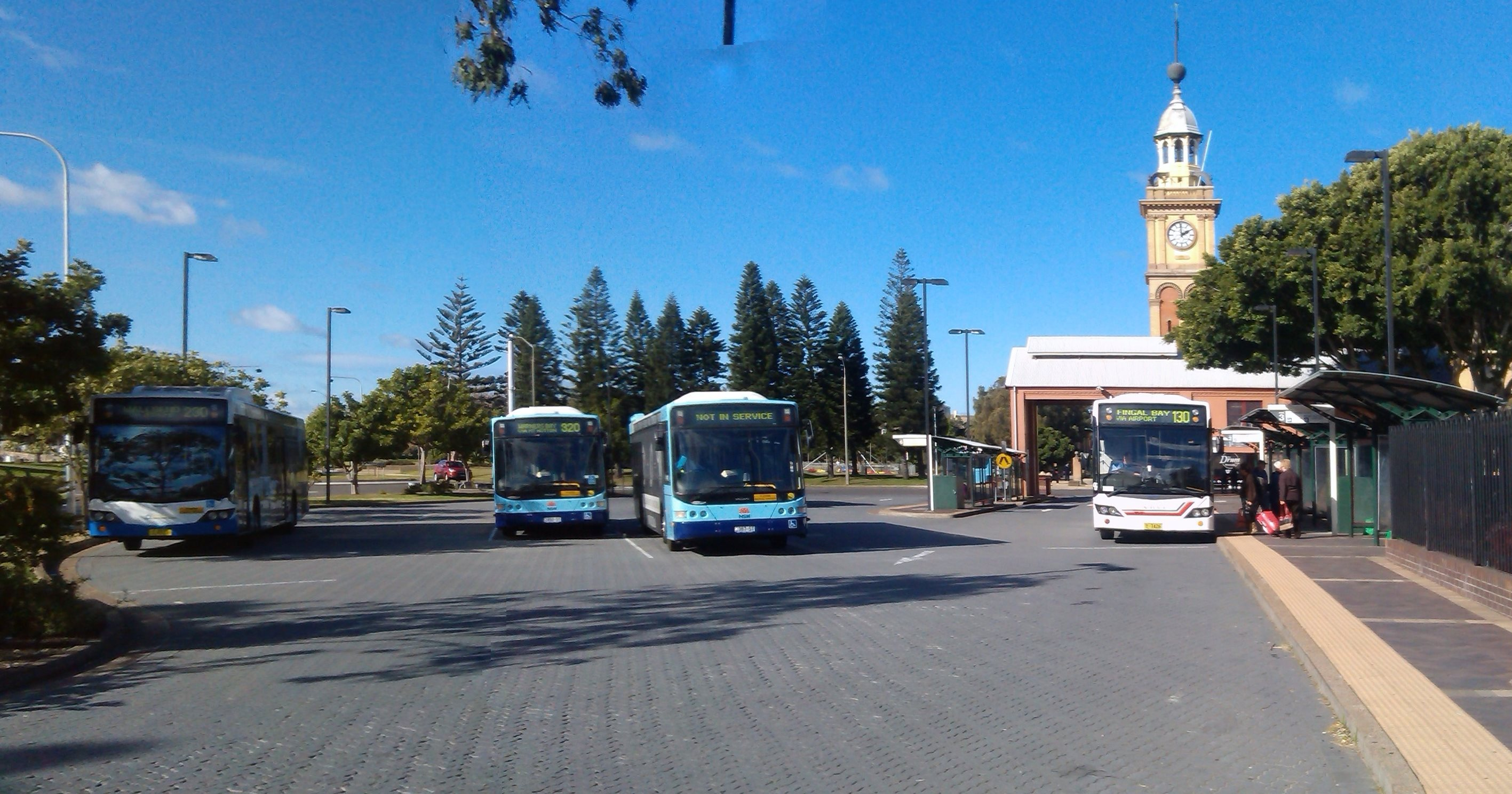
Bus terminal in July 2014

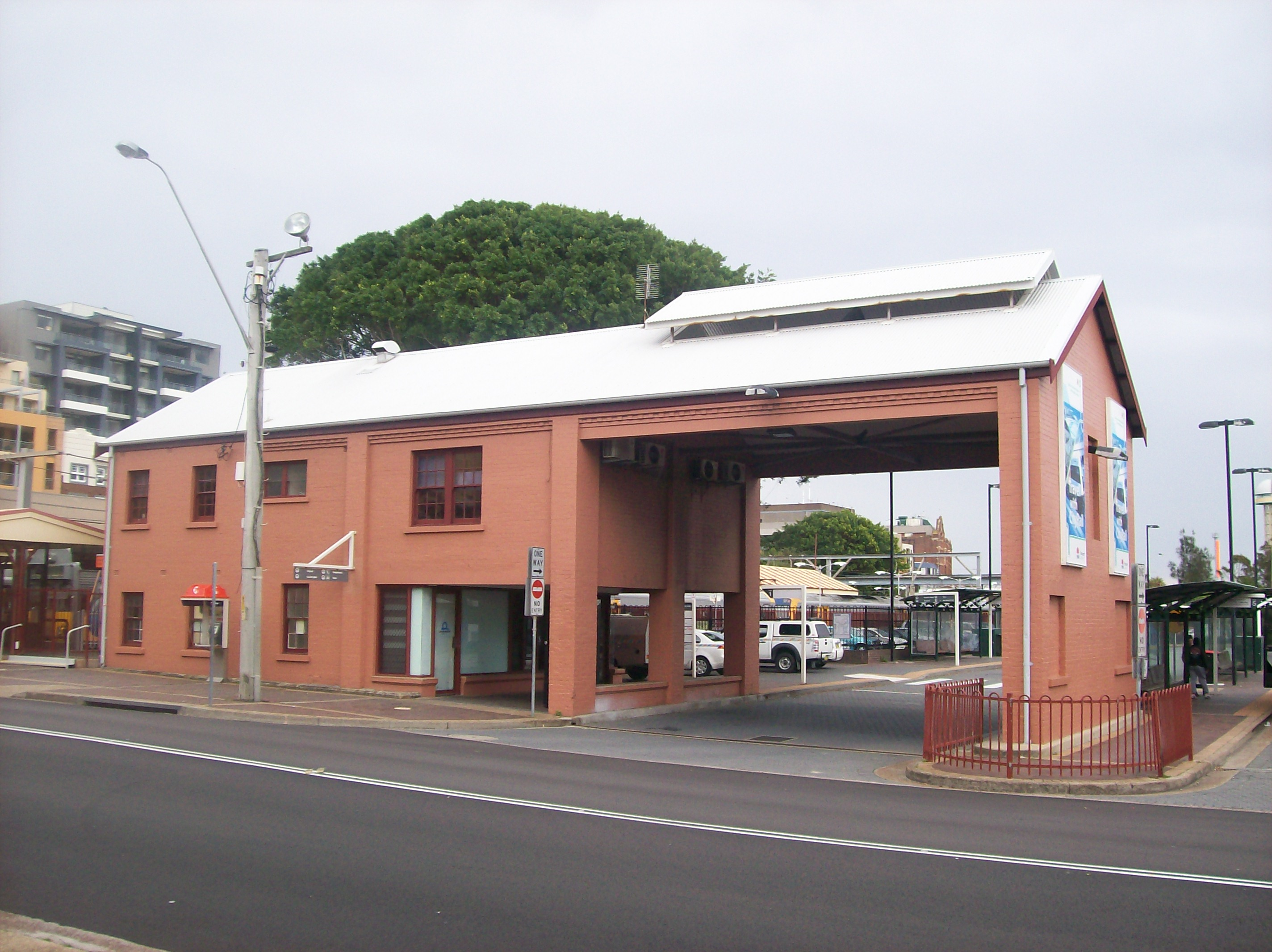
Entrance to the bus terminal in July 2013

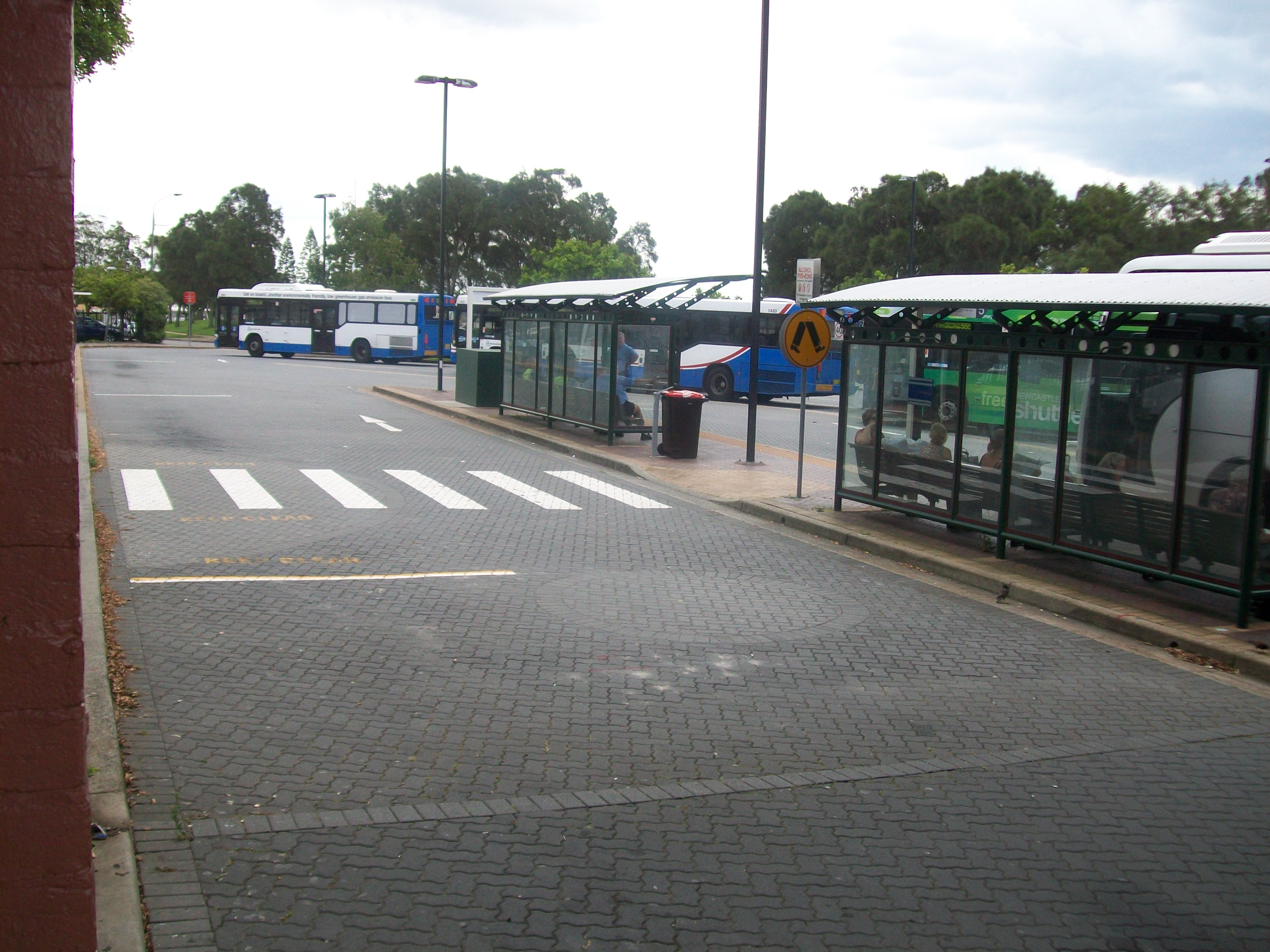
Bus terminal in November 2011

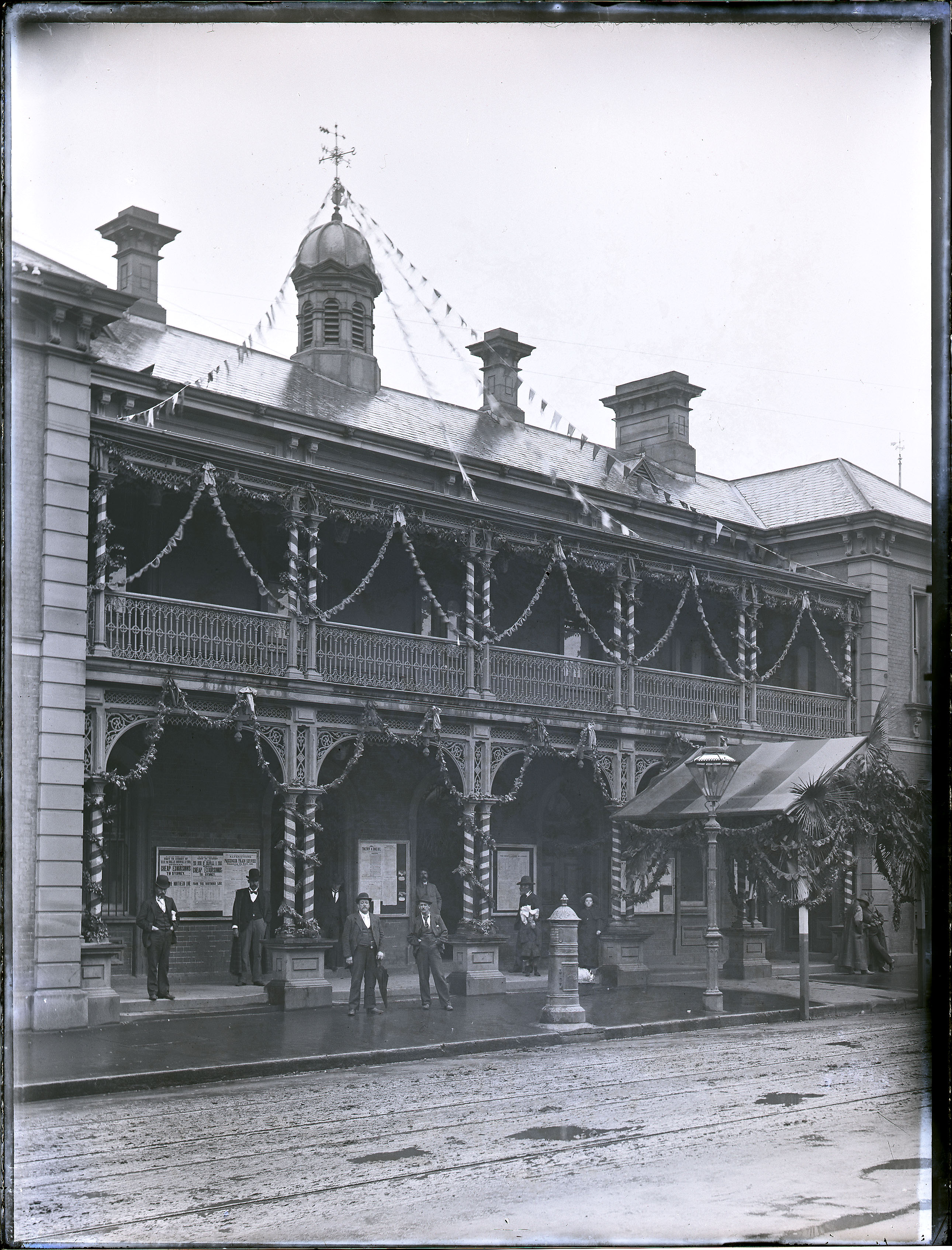
Newcastle Railway Station, Newcastle, New South Wales, 28 May 1901

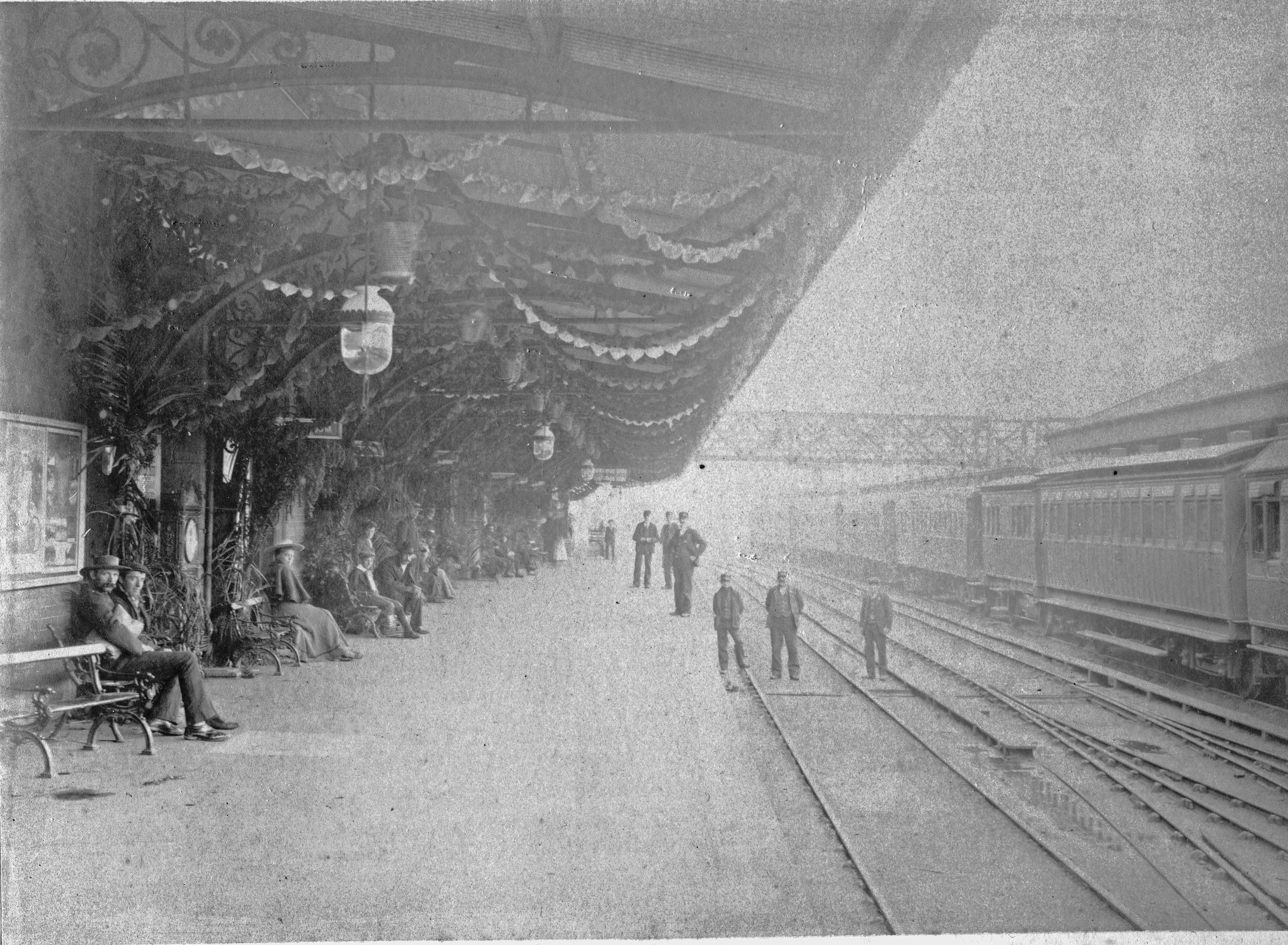
Newcastle Railway Station, Newcastle, New South Wales, view on platform

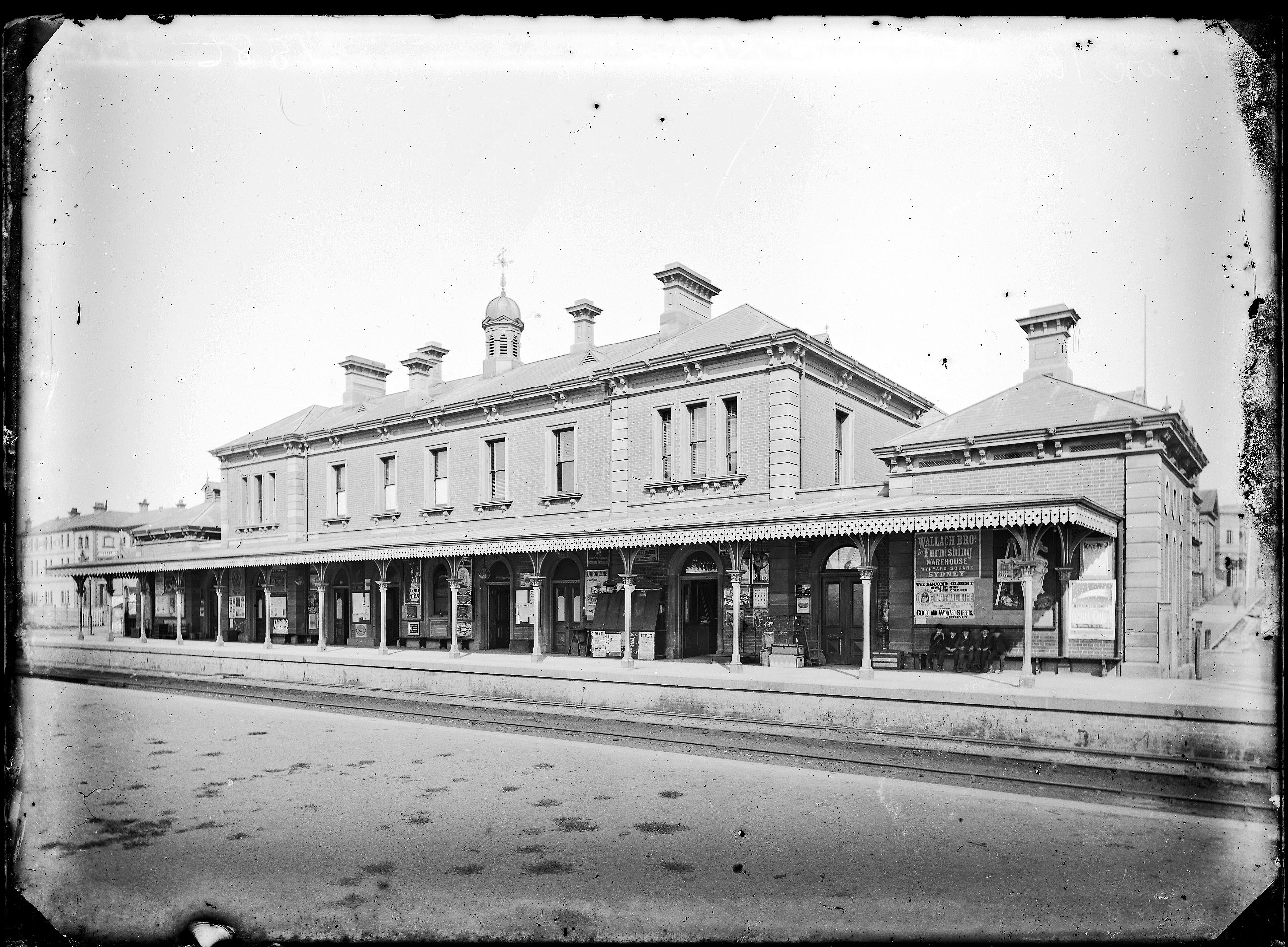
Newcastle Railway Station, Newcastle, New South Wales, 1886

=== Post-closure ===
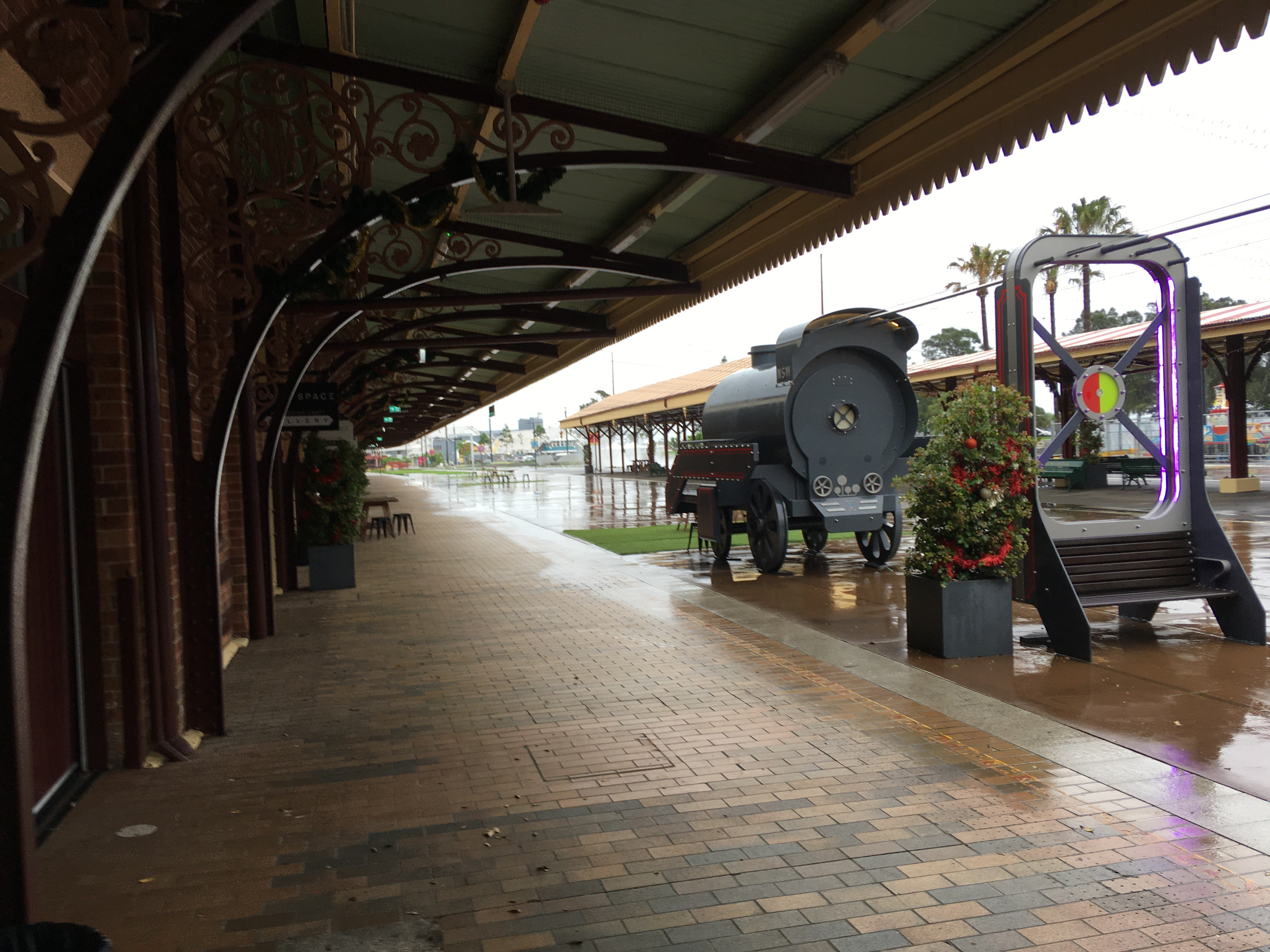
The former southernmost platform at The Station Newcastle, facing west, in January 2021

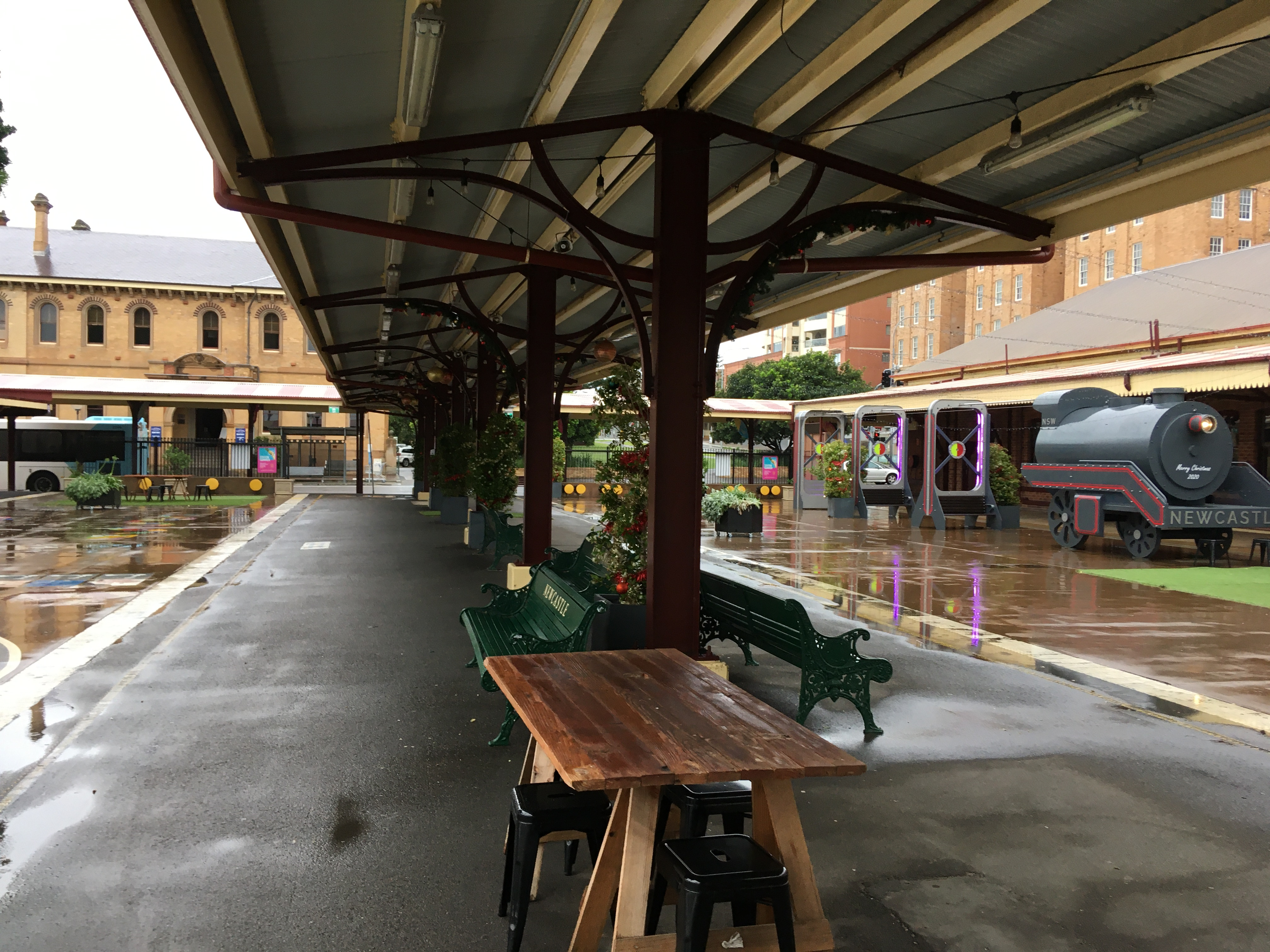
The former centre platform at The Station Newcastle, facing west in January 2021

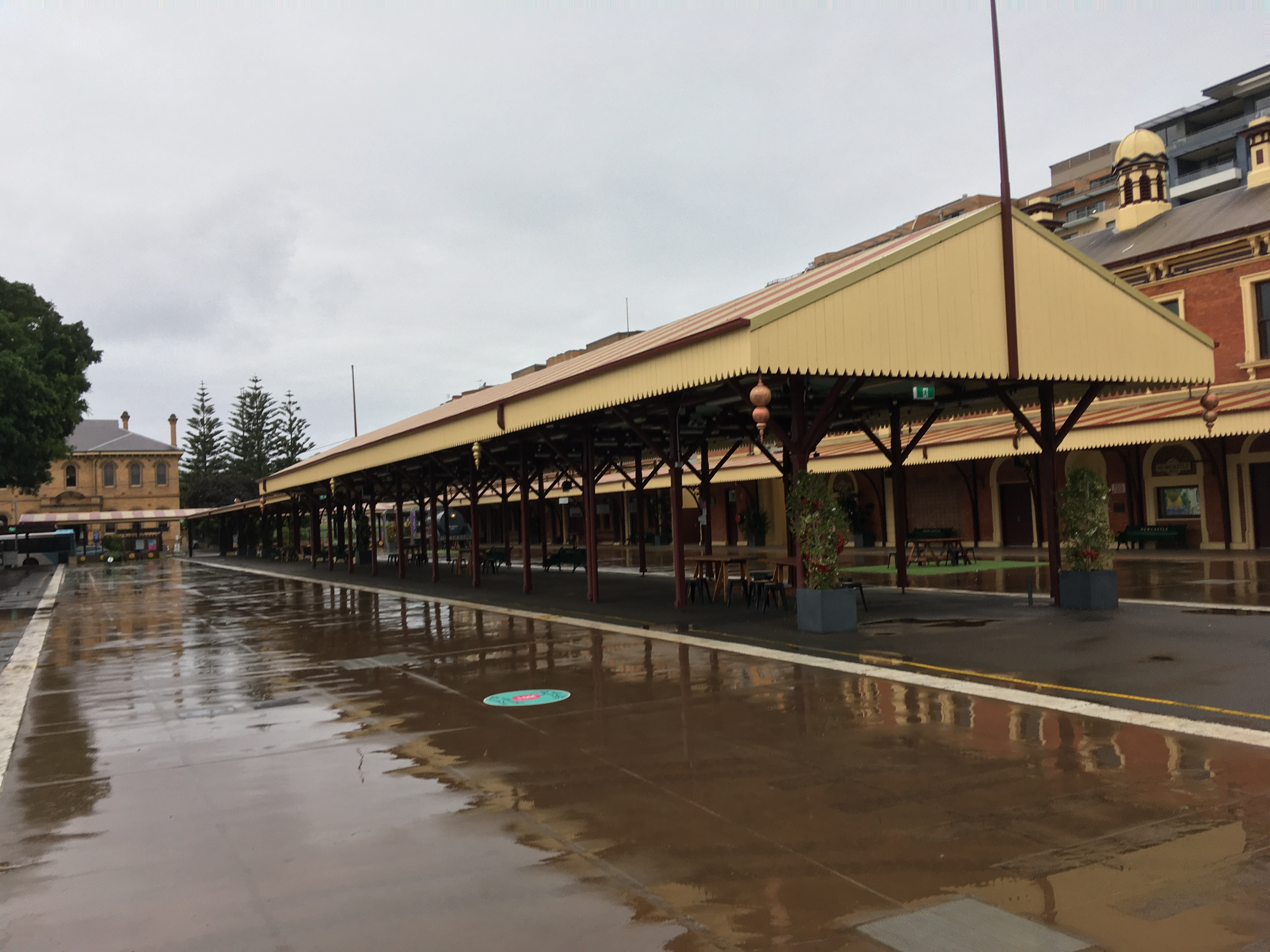
The former centre platform at The Station Newcastle, facing east, in January 2021

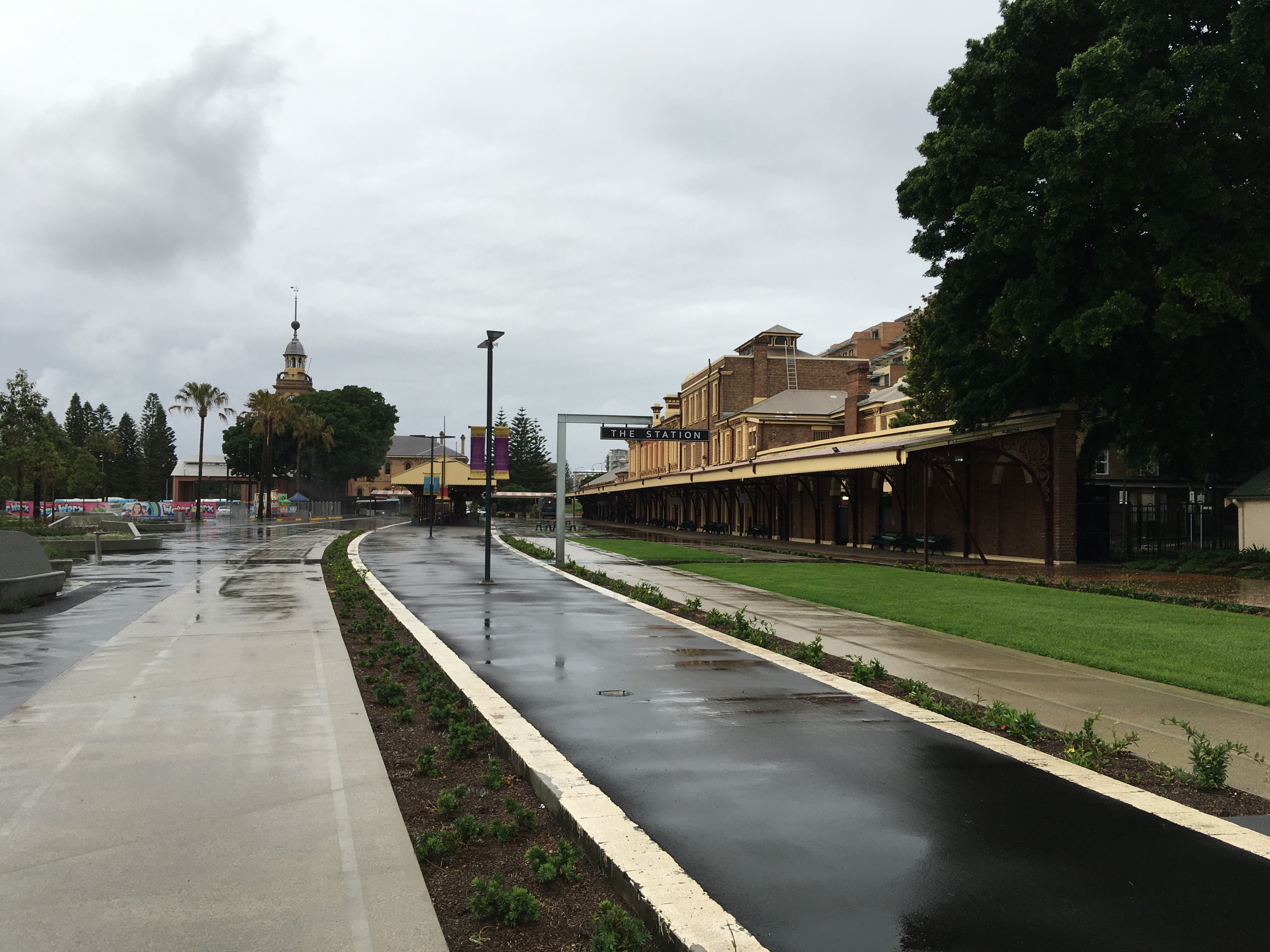
The Station Newcastle precinct, facing east, in January 2021
