= Civic railway station =

Former railway station in New South Wales, Australia

Civic
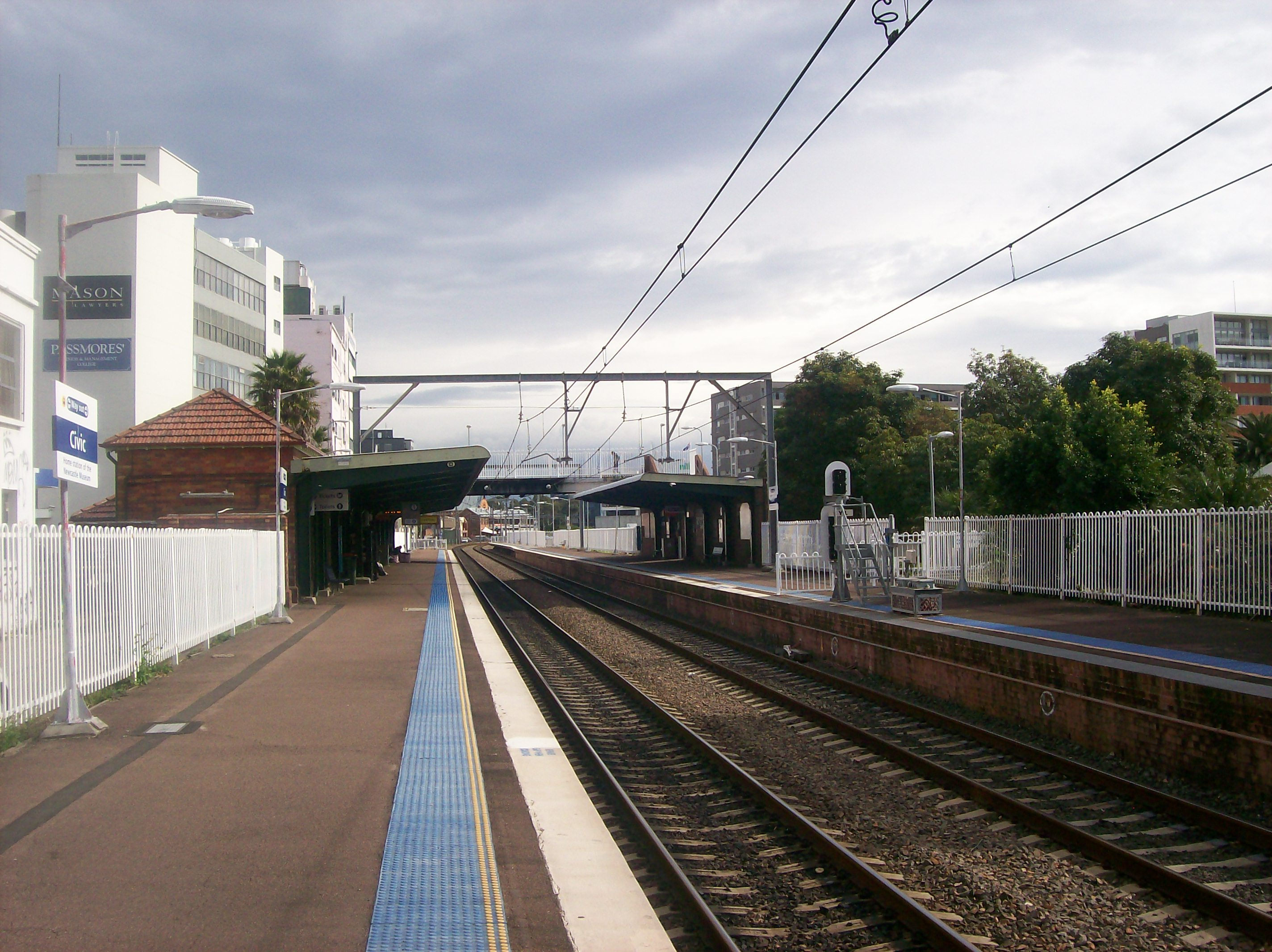
- Westbound view from Platform 1 in July 2013

General information
- Location: Hunter Street, Newcastle; Australia
- Coordinates: 32°55′36″S 151°46′20″E
- Owner: Transport Asset Manager of New South Wales
- Line: Newcastle
- Distance: 167.02 kilometres from Central
- Platforms: 2 side
- Tracks: 2

Construction
- Structure type: Ground
- Accessible: Yes

Other information
- Station code: CVI
- Website: Sydney Trains

History
- Opened: 22 December 1935
- Closed: 26 December 2014

Passengers
- 2013: 890 (daily) (NSW TrainLink)
- Rank: 163
Location

Civic railway station was located on the Newcastle line in New South Wales, Australia. It served the Civic part of Newcastle's central business district, opening on 22 December 1935. The station had the smallest signal box in the state to control the Merewether Street level crossing. The signal box closed in July 1992. Civic station closed on 25 December 2014, when the Newcastle line was truncated to terminate at Hamilton for the construction of Newcastle Interchange and the Newcastle Light Rail. Civic light rail stop is located in Hunter Street, immediately adjacent to the old station.

The station precinct was redeveloped into Museum Park, which opened in 2019; the area between the platforms was filled in and the station shelters and buildings (now occupied by the Newcastle Visitor Information Centre) preserved.

== Platforms and services ==
Civic had two side platforms that could accommodate six carriages. At the time of its closure, it was serviced by trains from Sydney Central to Newcastle and local services from Newcastle to Maitland, Muswellbrook, Scone, Telarah and Dungog.

Platform 1 was for services to Newcastle. Platform 2 was for services to Gosford, Sydney Central, Maitland, Telarah, Dungog, Muswellbrook and Scone.

In 2007, Platform 2 was extended at its western end to allow the Merewether Street level crossing to remain open while trains were stopped at the station.
