= Hilldale, New South Wales =

Country town in Australia

Coordinates: 32°30′11″S 151°39′01″E

Hilldale New South Wales
- Population: 193 (SAL 2021)
- Postcode(s): 2420
- Time zone: AEST (UTC+10)
  - Summer (DST): AEDT (UTC+11)
- LGA(s): Dungog Shire
- State electorate(s): Upper Hunter
- Federal division(s): Lyne
Localities around Hilldale:
| Lewinsbrook | Wallaringa | Wallarobba |
| Torryburn | Hilldale | Wallarobba |
| Vacy | Martins Creek | Martins Creek |

Hilldale is a small country town located between Dungog and Maitland in the Hunter Region of Australia. Hilldale had a population of 193 people in the 2021 Census.

== Transport ==
Hilldale railway station is located on the North Coast Line in New South Wales, Australia. It is served by NSW TrainLink's Hunter line services travelling between Newcastle and Dungog. There are approximately 62 local services to Hilldale each week.
