= Wirragulla, New South Wales =

Country town in Australia

Coordinates: 32°27′37″S 151°44′44″E

Wirragulla New South Wales
- Population: 25 (SAL 2021)
- Postcode(s): 2420
- Time zone: AEST (UTC+10)
  - Summer (DST): AEDT (UTC+11)
- LGA(s): Dungog Shire
- State electorate(s): Upper Hunter
- Federal division(s): Lyne
Suburbs around Wirragulla:
Hanleys Creek	Tabbil Creek	Alison
Wallaringa	Wirragulla	Alison
Wallaringa	Wallarobba	Brookfield

Wirragulla is a small country town located between Dungog and Maitland in the Hunter Region of Australia. Wirragulla had a population of 25 people in the 2021 Census.

== Transport ==
Wirragulla railway station is located on the North Coast Line in New South Wales, Australia. It is served by NSW TrainLink's Hunter line services travelling between Newcastle and Dungog. There are approximately 62 local services to Wirragulla each week.
