= Clarence Town Courthouse =

Courthouse
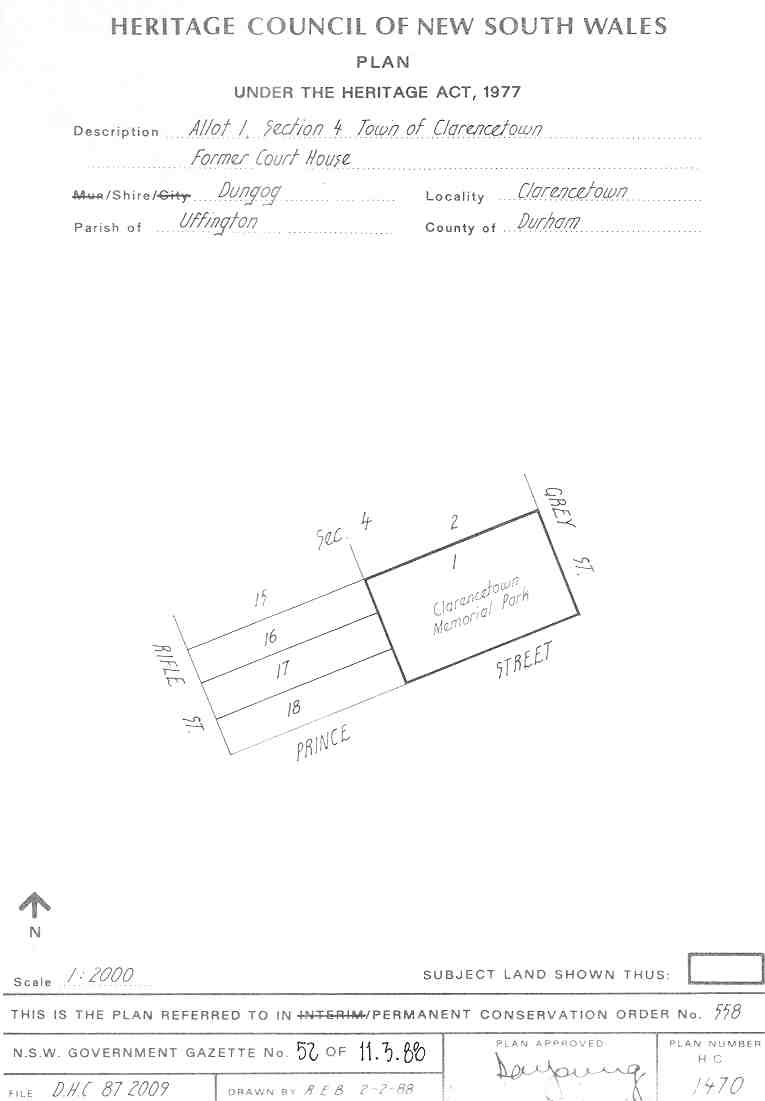
- Heritage boundaries

- Location within New South Wales Location within Australia
- 32.5854°S 151.7794°E
- Location: 49 Grey Street, Clarence Town, Dungog Shire, New South Wales, Australia

History
- Built: 1868–1869

New South Wales Heritage Register
- Official name: Courthouse and site (former); Courthouse and site
- Type: state heritage (built)
- Designated: 2 April 1999
- Reference no.: 558
- Type: Courthouse
- Category: Law Enforcement

Clarence Town Courthouse is a heritage-listed former courthouse and now museum at 49 Grey Street, Clarence Town in the Hunter region of New South Wales, Australia. It was built from 1868 to 1869. It was added to the New South Wales State Heritage Register on 2 April 1999.

== History ==
=== Clarence Town ===
The area was originally inhabited by the Wanaruah Aboriginal people who called it Erringhi. There is a hotel in the main street of Clarence Town built in 1913 called The Erringhi Hotel.

The township is most famous for building and launching the William IV paddle steamer in 1831, although the town was still called Erringhi at this time. It was later renamed in 1832 after the Duke of Clarence, who became King William IV in 1830.

Clarence Town like many places on the Hunter River, Paterson River and Williams River was first visited by timber getters, with land grants made as early as 1825. With its deep water river frontages, Clarence Town was early a place from which timber and other goods could be transported and many of the grantees further up the Williams River made application for small grants at this head of navigation to establish stores for their produce awaiting transhipment. Clarence Town was proclaimed a town in 1832, the third in the Hunter district after Newcastle and Maitland, and provided with a generous street plan. Also established here was a shipbuilding industry where Australia's first ocean-going steamer was built. The early establishment of relatively small farms on the river and the ease of river transport led to rapid growth. Along with tobacco factories and steam driven flour mills, one of the earliest National Schools was founded here in 1849.

Despite its early establishment and river traffic, Clarence Town was not provided with services as quickly as either nearby Paterson or Dungog. By the 1860s, regular coach services connected the steamer services of Clarence Town with Dungog and other rural towns, and a new courthouse was erected in 1869. In the 1880s, many of Clarence Town's most prominent public buildings and private houses were built and it was in this period that the functional river steamers began to be supplemented by pleasure cruises from Newcastle. Although the decline of Clarence Town in the 20th century is generally attributed to the railway route running through Dungog, there is evidence that even before this it was affected by the tobacco tax, four floods and the depression of the 1890s.

When Wallarobba Shire was formed in 1906, it remained based at Dungog and from the reports of its deliberations in the Dungog Chronicle rarely, if ever, concerned itself with its smaller towns such as Clarence Town or Gresford. Clarence Town seems to have been left to its own devices as far as town management was concerned and possibly had a Town Committee, though what its legal status was is unclear; certainly a Progress Association also existed to help with local improvements.

Clarence Town was the area's centre for shipping until the railway reached Dungog in 1911.

The slow decline in Clarence Town's population has reversed in recent times as it has gradually transformed into a commuter suburb for those working in Newcastle.

=== Court House ===
The Clarence Town Courthouse was built in 1868–69. The design has been attributed to either Colonial Architect James Barnet (State Heritage Register) or Clerk of Works for the Northern District of the Department of Public Works, Mortimer William Lewis Jr (Dungog Shire Conservation Management Plan).

It served as a Court of Petty Sessions for Clarence Town and District from 1869 to 1970. It then became the local police station from 1970 until 1987. In 1990, it was adapted to its current use as the Clarence Town and District Historical Museum.

The former court house building is now the site of a local history museum which focuses on Clarence Town as a terminal of navigation and river port. Its collection encompasses shipbuilding, exploration, maps, documents photographs, memorabilia, household items, timber-getting, agriculture and the history of the settlement of Williams River.

In addition to the above, a native cottage garden is in the process of being established, together with a replica pioneer settlers cottage about to be constructed, materials on site, containing names, photographs (where available), and information on Pioneer Settlers; all surrounded by native trees. In this manner there will be provided a background to Clarence Town's heritage and a support to the Historical Museum.

In April 2018, the Dungog Shire Council resolved to transfer the building to the Clarence Town Progress Association as neither the financially strapped council nor the museum could afford the cost of building maintenance. This was credited by the Dungog Chronicle with "ending years of uncertainty over the site".

== Description ==
The Clarence Town Courthouse is a two-storey timber building in the Victorian Georgian style with steep gabled corrugated galvanised iron roof and integral hipped verandah roof. It is associated with the nineteenth century police station/residence adjacent.

The courthouse is essentially unchanged from its original design, as no major additions or alterations have been undertaken throughout its history. The interior is divided into four main rooms: the court room, the police office, the magistrates' room, and storerooms (former meeting room).

== Heritage listing ==
Clarence Town Courthouse was listed on the New South Wales State Heritage Register on 2 April 1999.
