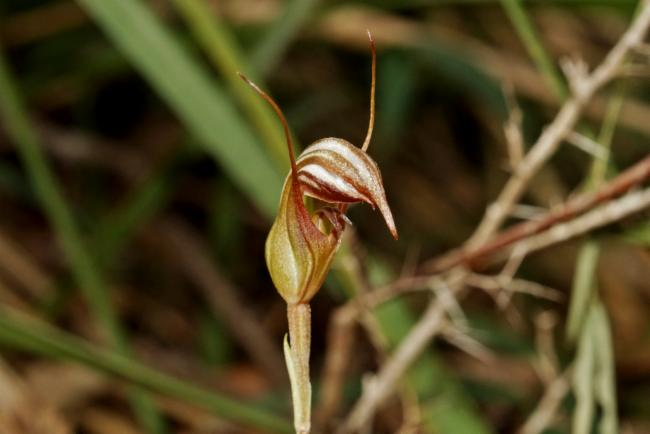
- Pterostylis collina growing near Clarence Town

Scientific classification
- Kingdom: Plantae
- Clade: Tracheophytes
- Clade: Angiosperms
- Clade: Monocots
- Order: Asparagales
- Family: Orchidaceae
- Subfamily: Orchidoideae
- Tribe: Cranichideae
- Genus: Pterostylis
- Species: P. collina

Binomial name
- Pterostylis collina (Rupp) D.L.Jones & M.A.Clem.

Synonyms
- Diplodium collinum (Rupp) M.A.Clem. & D.L.Jones; Pterostylis collina D.L.Jones nom. inval.; Pterostylis ophioglossa var. collina Rupp; Taurantha collina (Rupp) D.L.Jones & M.A.Clem.

= Pterostylis collina =

Shiny bull orchid

Species of orchid

Pterostylis collina, commonly known as the shiny bull orchid, is a species of orchid endemic to New South Wales. It has a rosette of leaves and when flowering, a single reddish-brown, green and white flower with a curved top.

== Description ==
Pterostylis collina is a terrestrial, perennial, deciduous, herb with an underground tuber and a rosette of between three and six egg-shaped leaves, each leaf 15–40 mm (0.6–2 in) long and 5–15 mm (0.2–0.6 in) wide. Flowering plants have a rosette at the base of a flowering stem with a single reddish-brown, green and white flower. The flower is 22–26 mm (0.9–1 in) long and 9–12 mm (0.4–0.5 in) wide and is borne on a flowering stem 100–200 mm (4–8 in) high. The dorsal sepal and petals are joined and curve forward in a semi-circle forming a hood called the "galea" over the column with the dorsal sepal longer than the petals. The lateral sepals are pressed against the galea and there is a broad, flat sinus between their bases. The lateral sepals have erect, thread-like tips 20–25 mm (0.8–1 in) long which spread apart from each other. The labellum is 13–15 mm (0.5–0.6 in) long, about 3 mm (0.1 in) wide and curved with a deep notch on the end. Flowering occurs between April and August.

== Taxonomy and naming ==
The shiny bull orchid was first formally described in 1929 by Herman Rupp who gave it the name Pterostylis ophioglossa var. collina. The description was published in Proceedings of the Royal Society of New South Wales from a specimen collected in the Paterson Valley north of Newcastle. In 1989 David Jones and Mark Clements raised the variety to species status with the name Pterostylis collina. The specific epithet (collina) is a Latin word meaning "of a hill" or "hilly".

== Distribution and habitat ==
Pterostylis collina grows in wet forest and on the edges of rainforest on the north coast north of Newcastle.
