= Wallarobba railway station =

Railway station in New South Wales, Australia

Wallarobba
- Station entrance, July 2026

General information
- Location: Brookfield Road, Wallarobba; Australia
- Coordinates: 32°29′46″S 151°41′44″E
- Owner: Transport Asset Manager of New South Wales
- Operator: Sydney Trains
- Line: North Coast
- Distance: 231.63 km (143.93 mi) from Central
- Platforms: 1
- Tracks: 1

Construction
- Structure type: Ground
- Accessible: Yes

Other information
- Station code: WLB
- Website: Transport for NSW

History
- Opened: 14 August 1911

Passengers
- 2023: Less than 50 every month. (Sydney Trains, NSW TrainLink)

Services
Preceding station	Intercity Trains	Following station
Wirragulla towards Dungog	Hunter Line	Hilldale towards Newcastle Interchange
Location

Wallarobba railway station is located on the North Coast line in New South Wales, Australia opening on 14 August 1911. It serves the rural locality of Wallarobba. Originally a full-length platform with wooden station buildings it was later replaced by the present short platform. It is serviced by Sydney Trains Hunter Line services travelling between Newcastle and Dungog.

== Platforms and services ==
Wallarobba consists of a single wooden platform about three metres long. It is serviced by Sydney Trains Hunter Line services travelling between Newcastle and Dungog. There are five services in each direction on weekdays, with three on weekends and public holidays. It is a request stop with passengers required to notify the guard if they wish to alight.

Platform	Line	Stopping pattern	Notes
1	HUN	services to Dungog & Newcastle (3–5 per day)	request stop

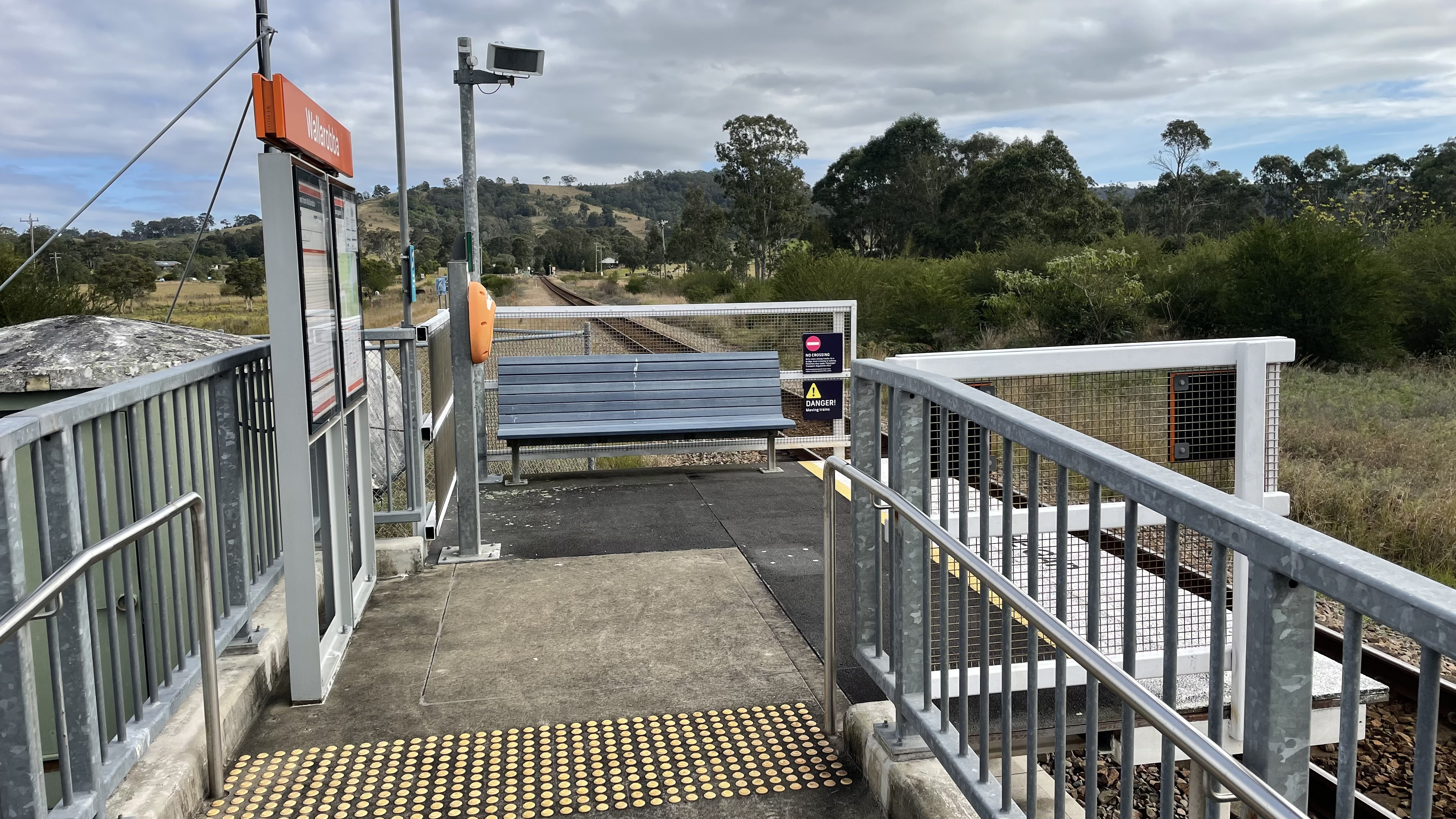
Platform

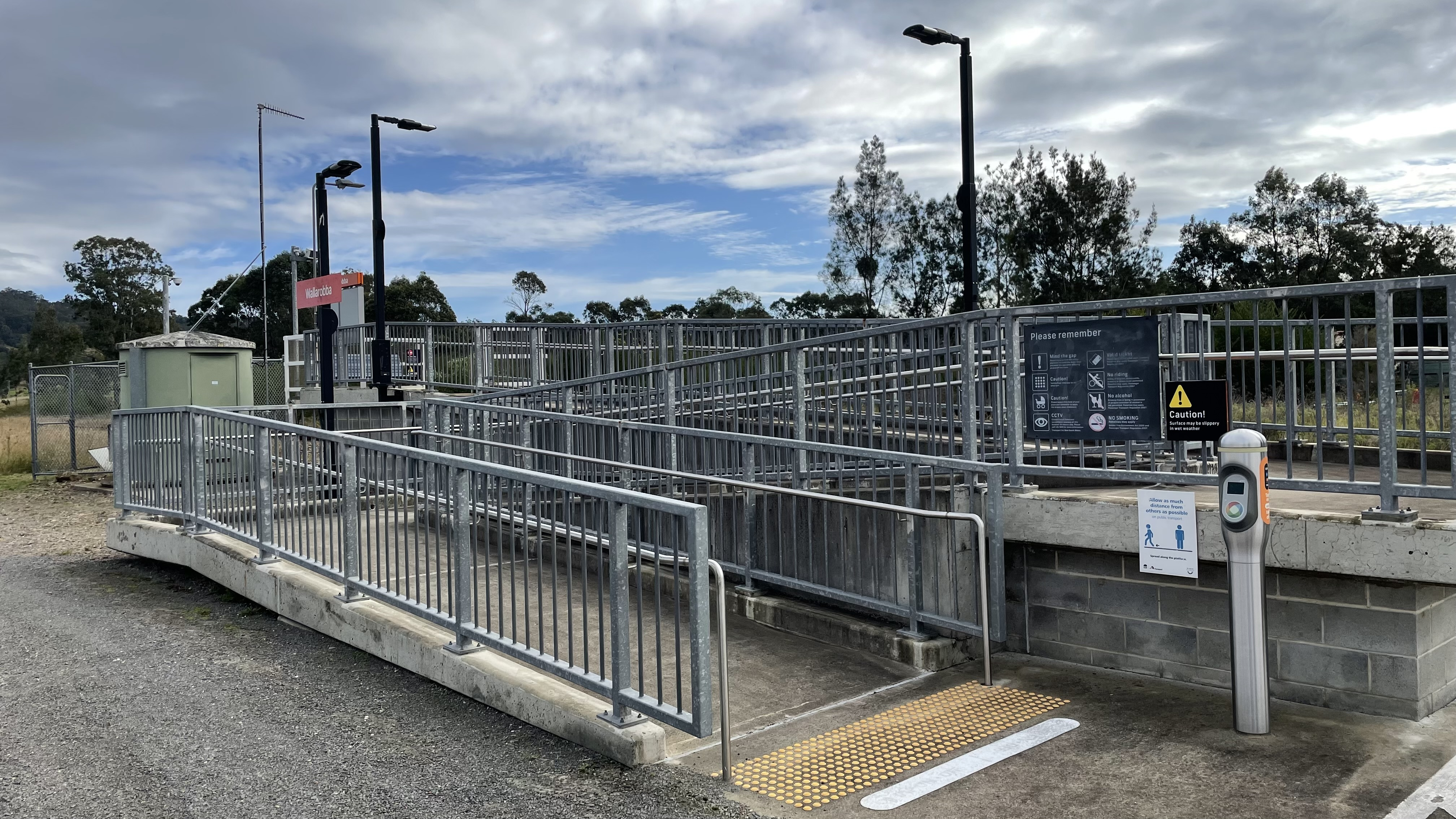
Entrance ramp

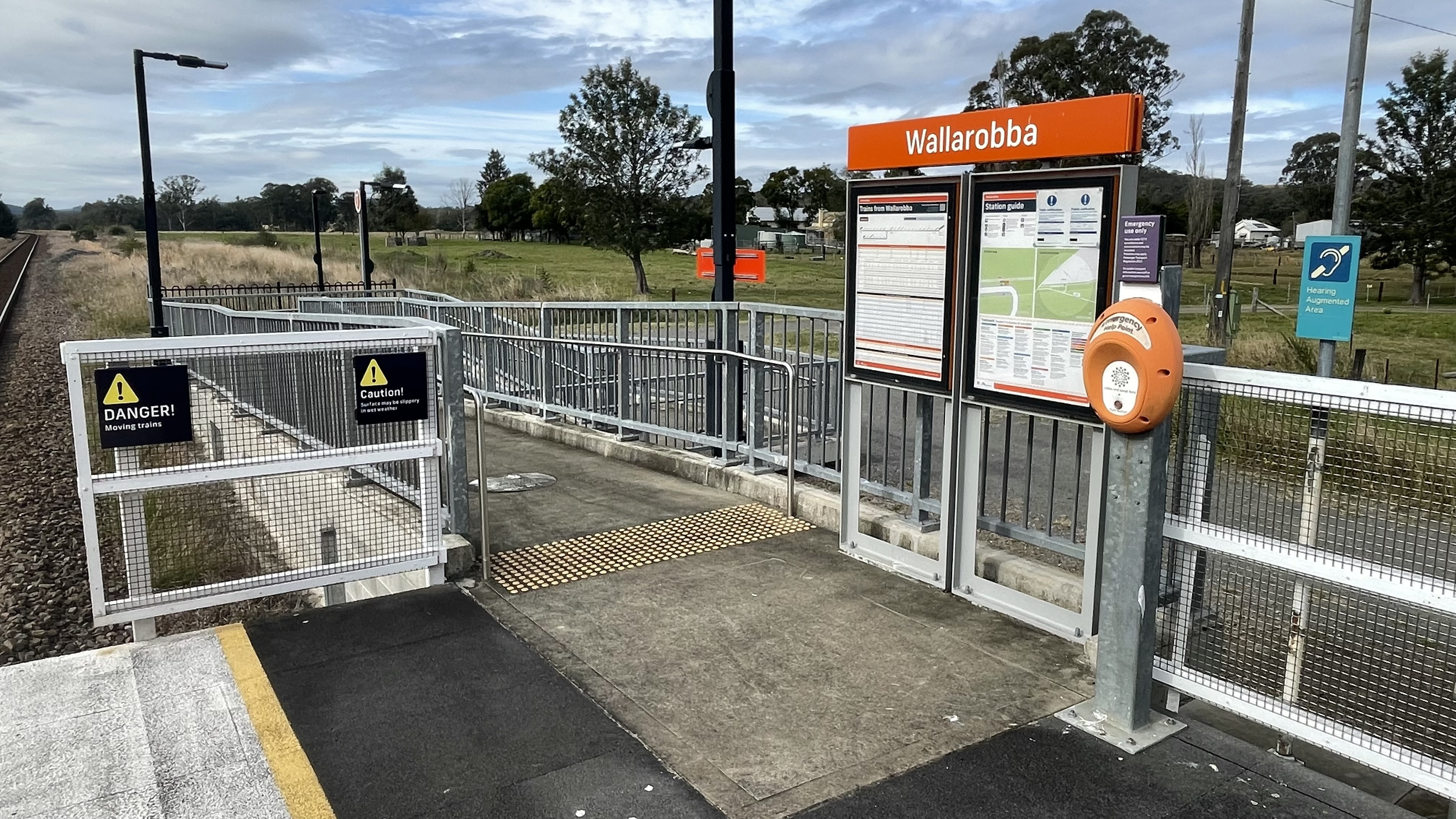
Exit view

== Accessibility ==
Although classified as wheelchair accessible, there have been complaints that the ramp is too steep and can not be used by wheelchairs. However, this was fixed in 2014 when the station received an upgrade.
