= Wallarobba, New South Wales =

Coordinates: 32°29′49″S 151°41′46″E

Wallarobba
- Suburb
- Country: Australia
- State: New South Wales
- LGA: Dungog Shire
- Location: 207 km (129 mi) NNE of Sydney; 69 km (43 mi) NNW of Newcastle; 36 km (22 mi) NE of Maitland; 42 km (26 mi) N of Raymond Terrace; 15 km (9.3 mi) SW of Dungog

Government
  - State electorate: Upper Hunter
  - Federal division: Lyne
- Elevation: 59 m (194 ft)

Population
  - Total: 174 (SAL 2021)
- Time zone: UTC+10 (AEST)
  - Summer (DST): UTC+11 (AEDT)
- Postcode: 2420
Suburbs around Wallarobba
Wallaringa	Wirragulla	Wirragulla
Hilldale	Wallarobba	Brookfield
Martins Creek	Clarence Town	Clarence Town

Wallarobba is a small country town located between Dungog and Maitland in the Hunter Region of Australia. Wallarobba had a population of 174 people in the 2021 Census. Wallarobba includes a tennis court, a memorial hall and the Wallarobba Rural Fire Brigade station.

== Transport ==
Wallarobba railway station is located on the North Coast Line in New South Wales, Australia. It is served by NSW TrainLink's Hunter line services travelling between Newcastle and Dungog. There are approximately 62 local services to Wallarobba each week.
