= Wirragulla railway station =

Railway station in New South Wales, Australia

Wirragulla
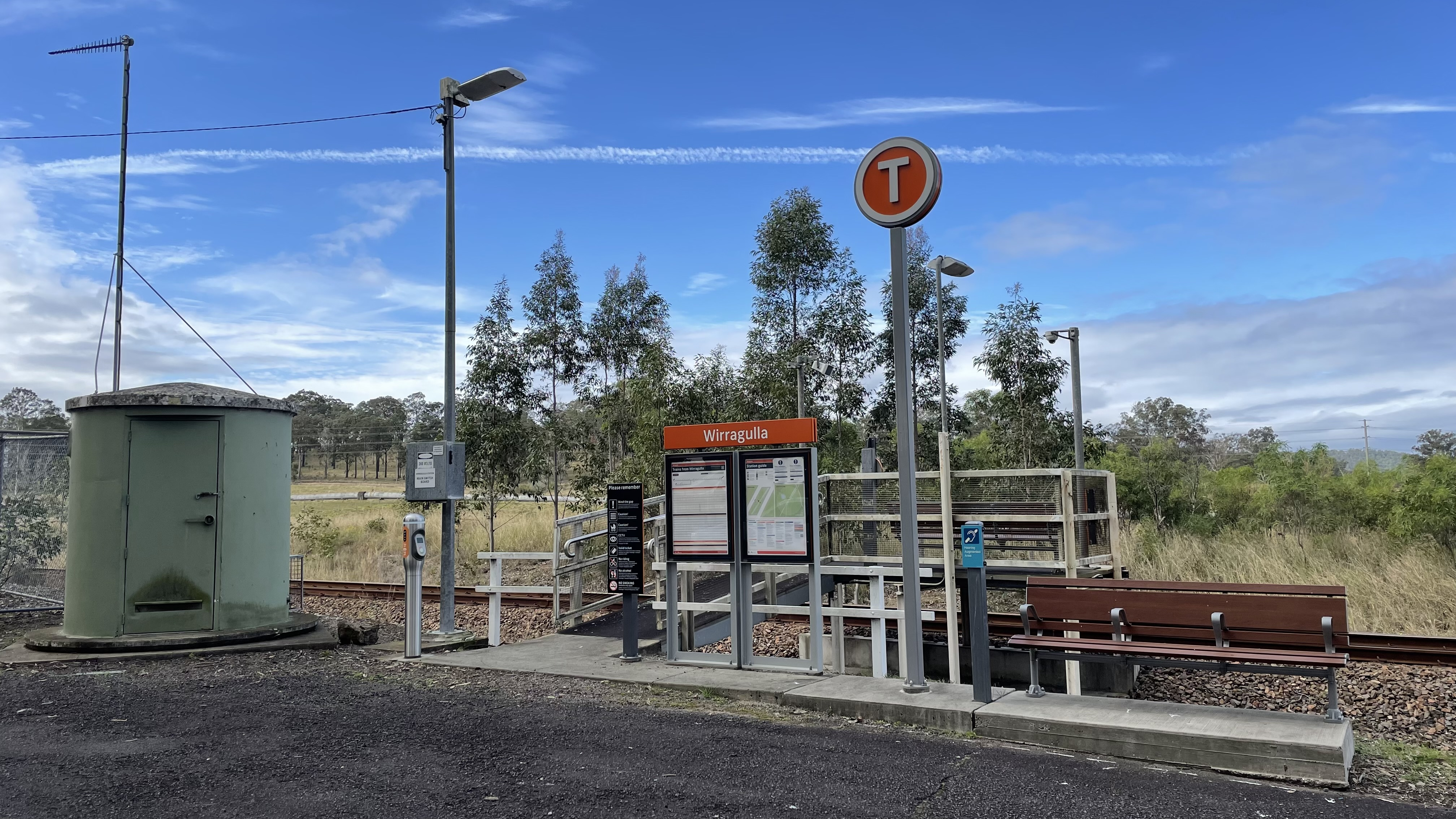
- The small station platform, June 2024

General information
- Location: Dungog Road, Wirragulla; Australia
- Coordinates: 32°27′47″S 151°44′33″E
- Elevation: 400 metres (1,300 ft)
- Owner: Transport Asset Manager of New South Wales
- Operator: Sydney Trains
- Line: North Coast
- Distance: 237.97 km (147.87 mi) from Central
- Platforms: 1
- Tracks: 1

Construction
- Structure type: Ground
- Parking: 10 spots (approx.)
- Accessible: Yes

Other information
- Station code: WGL
- Website: Transport for NSW

History
- Opened: 14 August 1911

Passengers
- 2023: Around one every few days.: Less than 50 every month. (Sydney Trains, NSW TrainLink)

Services
Preceding station	Intercity Trains	Following station
Dungog Terminus	Hunter Line	Wallarobba towards Newcastle Interchange
Location

Wirragulla railway station is located on the North Coast line in New South Wales, Australia. It serves the rural locality of Wirragulla. It is served by Sydney Trains Hunter Line services travelling between Newcastle and Dungog.

The station consists of a single concrete platform about three metres long. A ramp connects the platform with the small car park and Dungog Road.

== History ==
A station that first opened at Wirragulla on 14 August 1911 featured a proper platform. On 20 October 1975, the station was demolished and replaced with the current concrete (wooden until c. 2017) platform to reduce the maintenance costs. In the late 1990s it was proposed that Wirragulla, along with Allandale and Belford would be closed, as all three stations had extremely low patronage, and there were some safety concerns at these stations. The proposal to close these stations was later withdrawn (though Allandale and Belford stations ended up shutting in 2005).

== Platforms and services ==
Wirragulla is served by Sydney Trains Hunter Line services travelling between Newcastle and Dungog. There are five services in each direction on weekdays, with three on weekends and public holidays. It is a request stop with passengers required to notify the guard if they wish to alight.

Platform	Line	Stopping pattern	Notes
1	HUN	services to Dungog & Newcastle (3–5 per day)	request stop

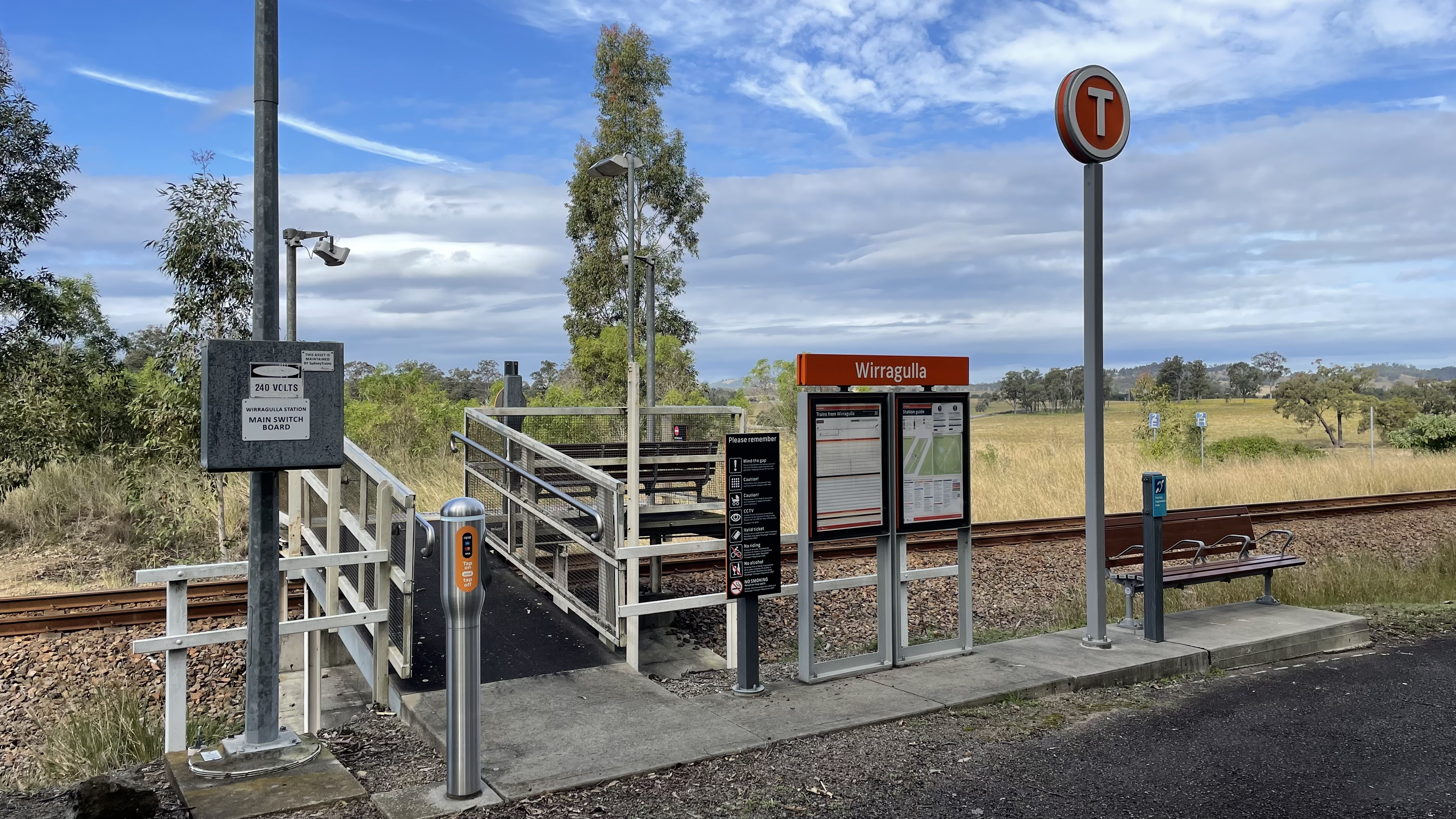
Entrance ramp

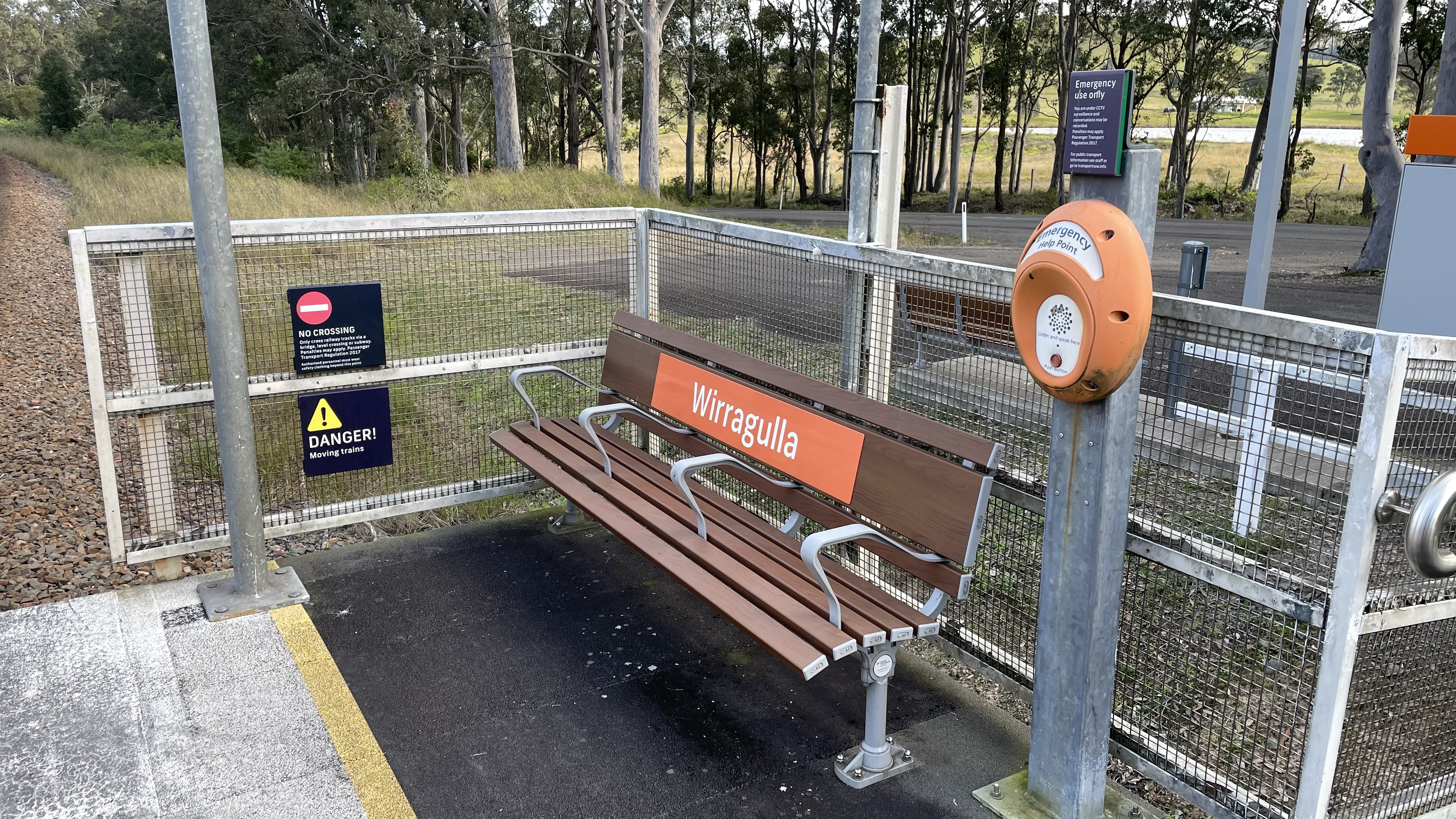
Platform
