= Minimbah railway station =

Former railway station in New South Wales

Minimbah

General information
- Location: Belford, New South Wales, New South Wales; Australia
- Coordinates: 32°39′43″S 151°14′31″E
- Line: Main North
- Distance: 226.095 km from Central
- Platforms: 2 (2 side)
- Tracks: 2

Construction
- Structure type: Ground

Other information
- Status: Demolished

History
- Opened: 28 August 1898
- Closed: c.1974

Services
Preceding station	Former services	Following station
Whittingham towards Wallangarra	Main Northern Line	Belford towards Sydney
Location

Minimbah railway station was a railway station on the Main North railway line in New South Wales. It opened in 1898 and closed around 1974. It was completely demolished after closure. Little trace remains.
