= Martins Creek railway station =

Railway station in New South Wales, Australia

Martins Creek
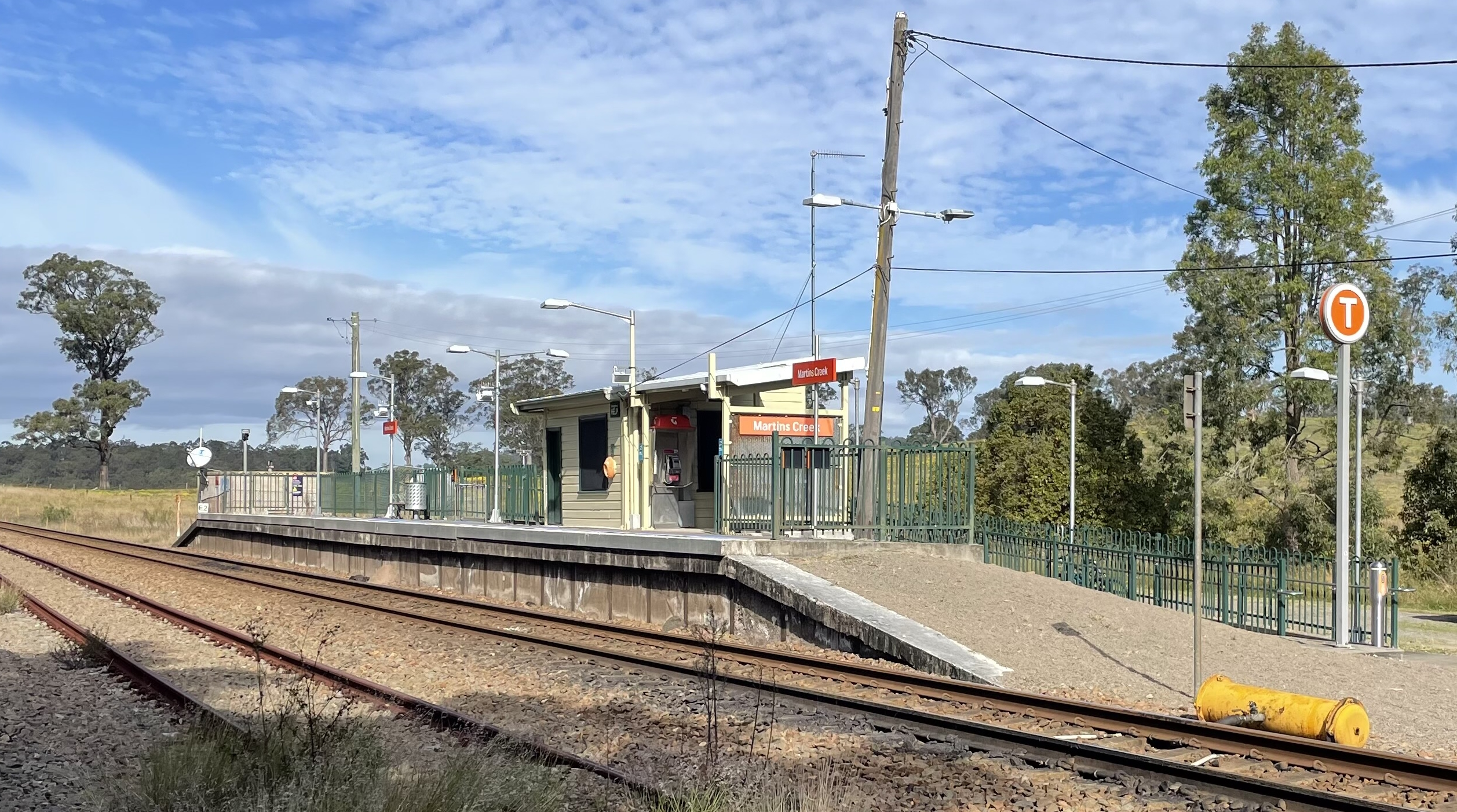
- Northbound view of the station platform, June 2024

General information
- Location: Martins Creek Road, Martins Creek; Australia
- Coordinates: 32°33′31″S 151°37′07″E
- Owner: Transport Asset Manager of New South Wales
- Operator: Sydney Trains
- Line: North Coast
- Distance: 218.53 km (135.79 mi) from Central
- Platforms: 1
- Tracks: 2

Construction
- Structure type: Ground
- Accessible: Yes

Other information
- Station code: MCR
- Website: Transport for NSW

History
- Opened: 14 August 1911

Passengers
- 2023: >260 (year) (Sydney Trains, NSW TrainLink)

Services
Preceding station	Intercity Trains	Following station
Hilldale towards Dungog	Hunter Line	Paterson towards Newcastle Interchange
Location

Martins Creek railway station is located on the North Coast line in New South Wales, Australia opening on 14 August 1911. It serves the town of Martins Creek. It is served by Sydney Trains Hunter Line services travelling between Newcastle and Dungog.

== Platforms and services ==
Martins Creek consists of a single platform. The original 1911 weatherboard building was demolished in 2009 and replaced by a waiting shelter.

It is served by Sydney Trains Hunter Line services travelling between Newcastle and Dungog. There are five services in each direction on weekdays, with three on weekends and public holidays.

Opposite the platform is a siding leading to Martins Creek Ballast Quarry. This was sold in December 2012 by RailCorp to the Daracon Group.

Platform	Line	Stopping pattern	Notes
1	HUN	services to Dungog & Newcastle (3–5 per day)	

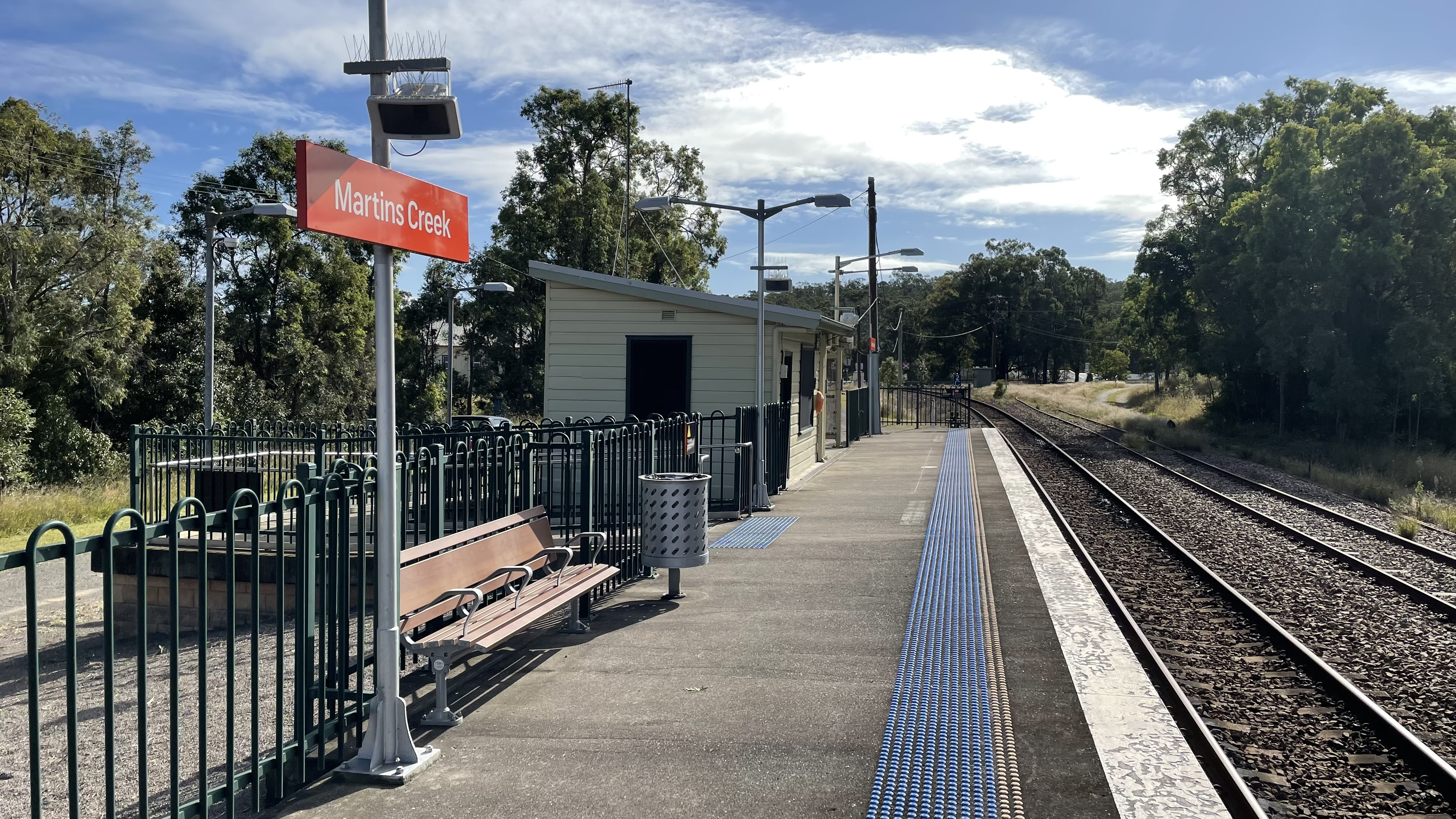
Looking north on the platform

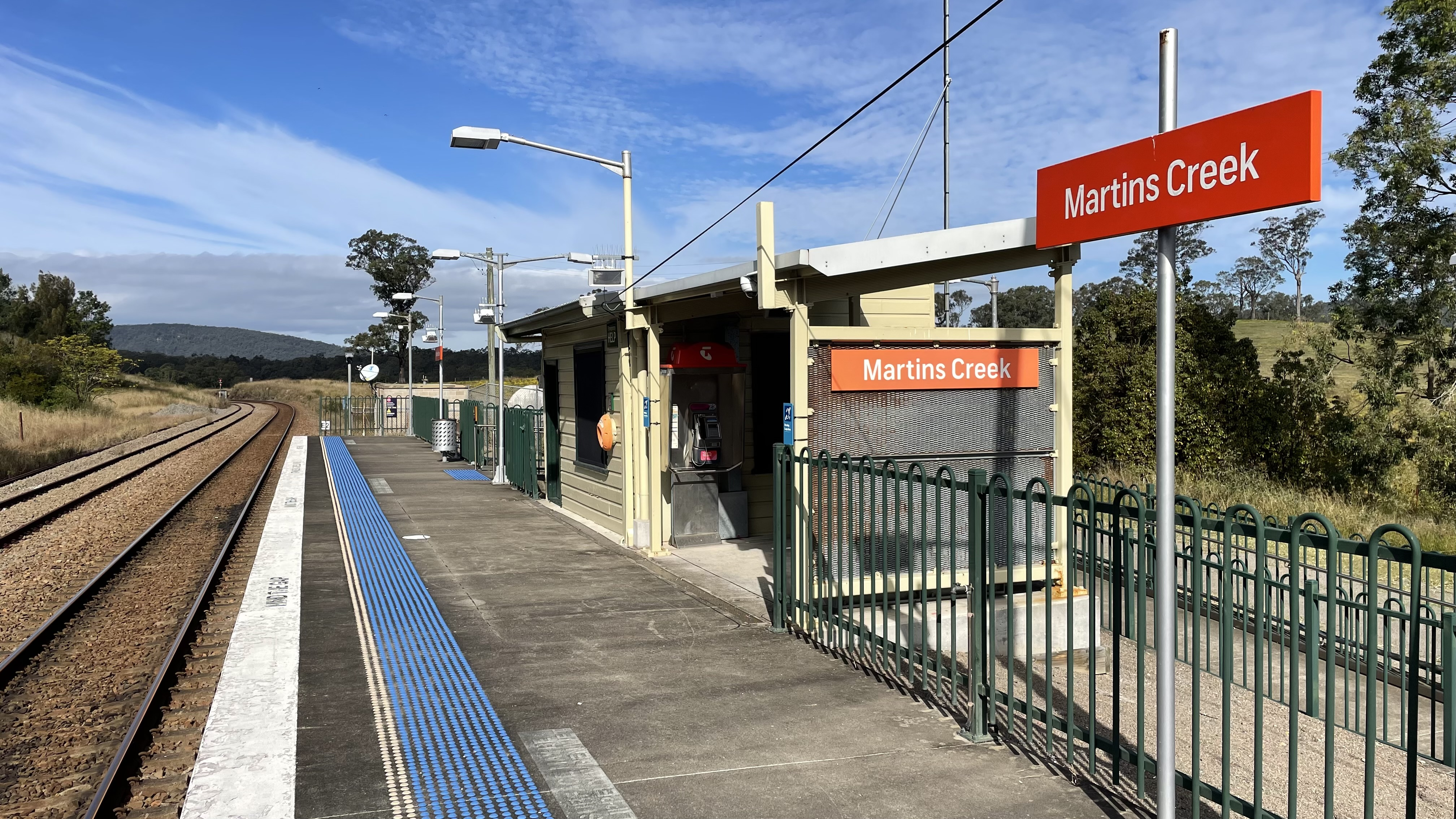
Looking south on the platform

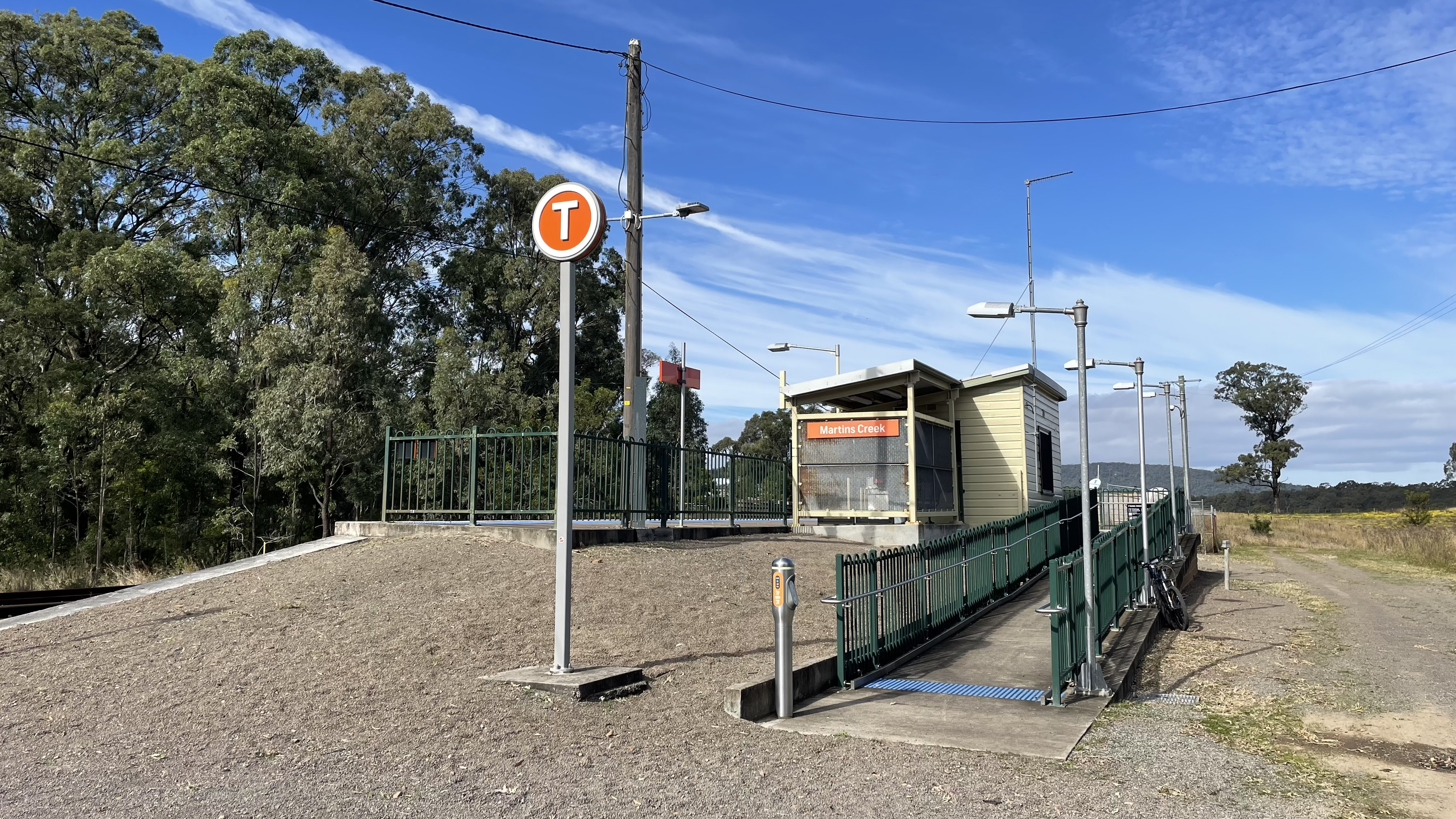
Station entrance
