= Belford railway station =

Belford railway station may refer to:

- Belford railway station, New South Wales
- Belford railway station (England), a former station on the East Coast Main Line in Northumberland
