= Hilldale railway station =

Railway station in New South Wales, Australia

Hilldale
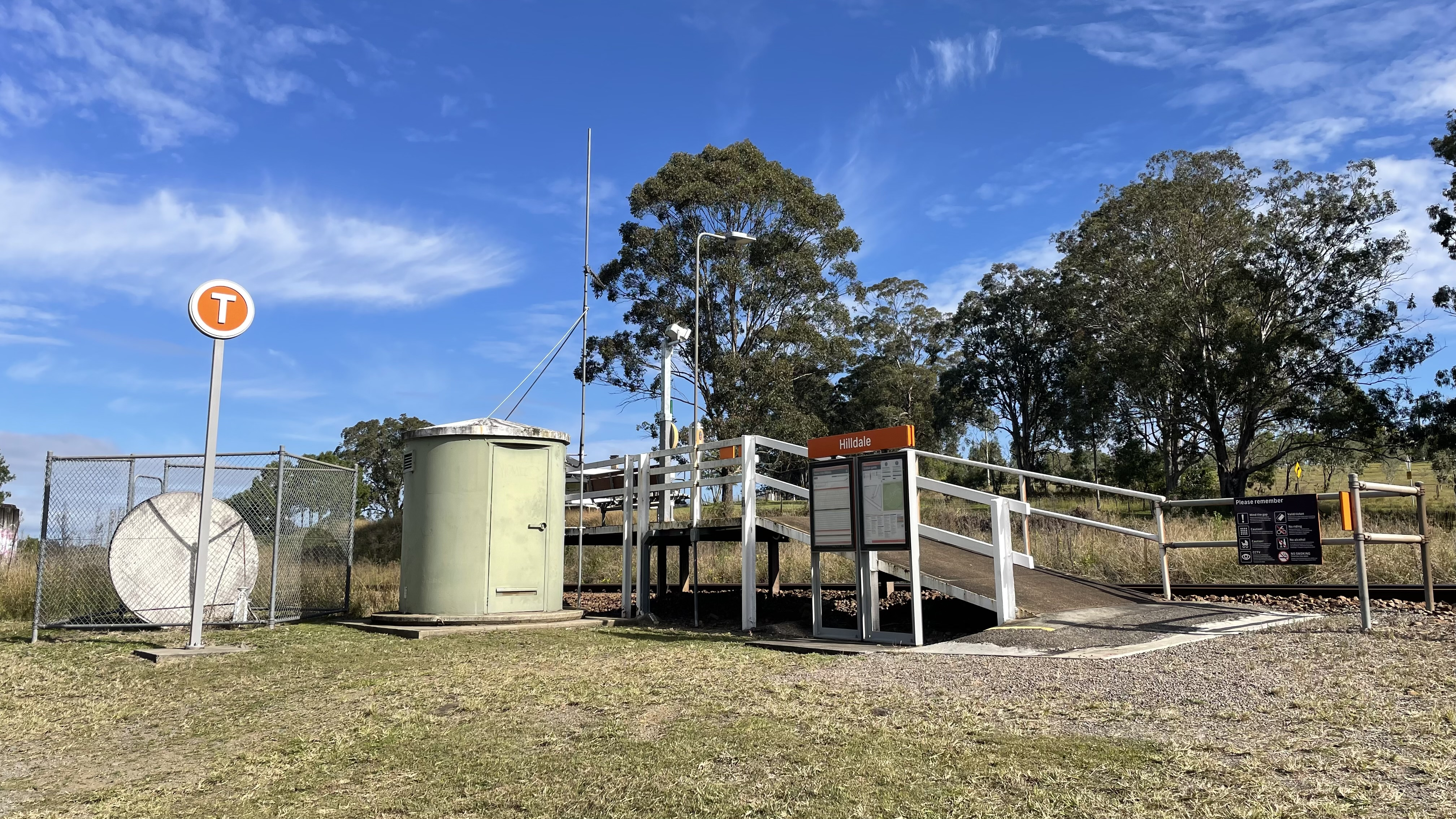
- Station entrance and small platform, June 2024

General information
- Location: Paterson Road, Hilldale; Australia
- Coordinates: 32°30′16″S 151°39′00″E
- Owner: Transport Asset Manager of New South Wales
- Operator: Sydney Trains
- Line: North Coast
- Distance: 226.37 km (140.66 mi) from Central
- Platforms: 1
- Tracks: 1

Construction
- Structure type: Ground
- Accessible: Yes

Other information
- Website: Transport for NSW

History
- Opened: 14 August 1911

Passengers
- 2023: Less than 50 every month. (Sydney Trains, NSW TrainLink)

Services
Preceding station	Intercity Trains	Following station
Wallarobba towards Dungog	Hunter Line	Martins Creek towards Newcastle Interchange
Location

Hilldale railway station is located on the North Coast line in New South Wales, Australia opening on 14 August 1911. Originally a full-length platform, it was later replaced by the present short platform. It serves the rural locality of Hilldale. It is serviced by Sydney Trains Hunter Line services travelling between Newcastle and Dungog.

== Platforms and services ==
Hilldale consists of a single wooden and concrete platform about three metres long. It is serviced by Sydney Trains Hunter Line services travelling between Newcastle and Dungog. There are five services in each direction on weekdays, with three on weekends and public holidays. It is a request stop with passengers required to notify the guard if they wish to alight and "flag" the train down if they wish to board.

Platform	Line	Stopping pattern	Notes
1	HUN	services to Dungog & Newcastle (3–5 per day)	request stop

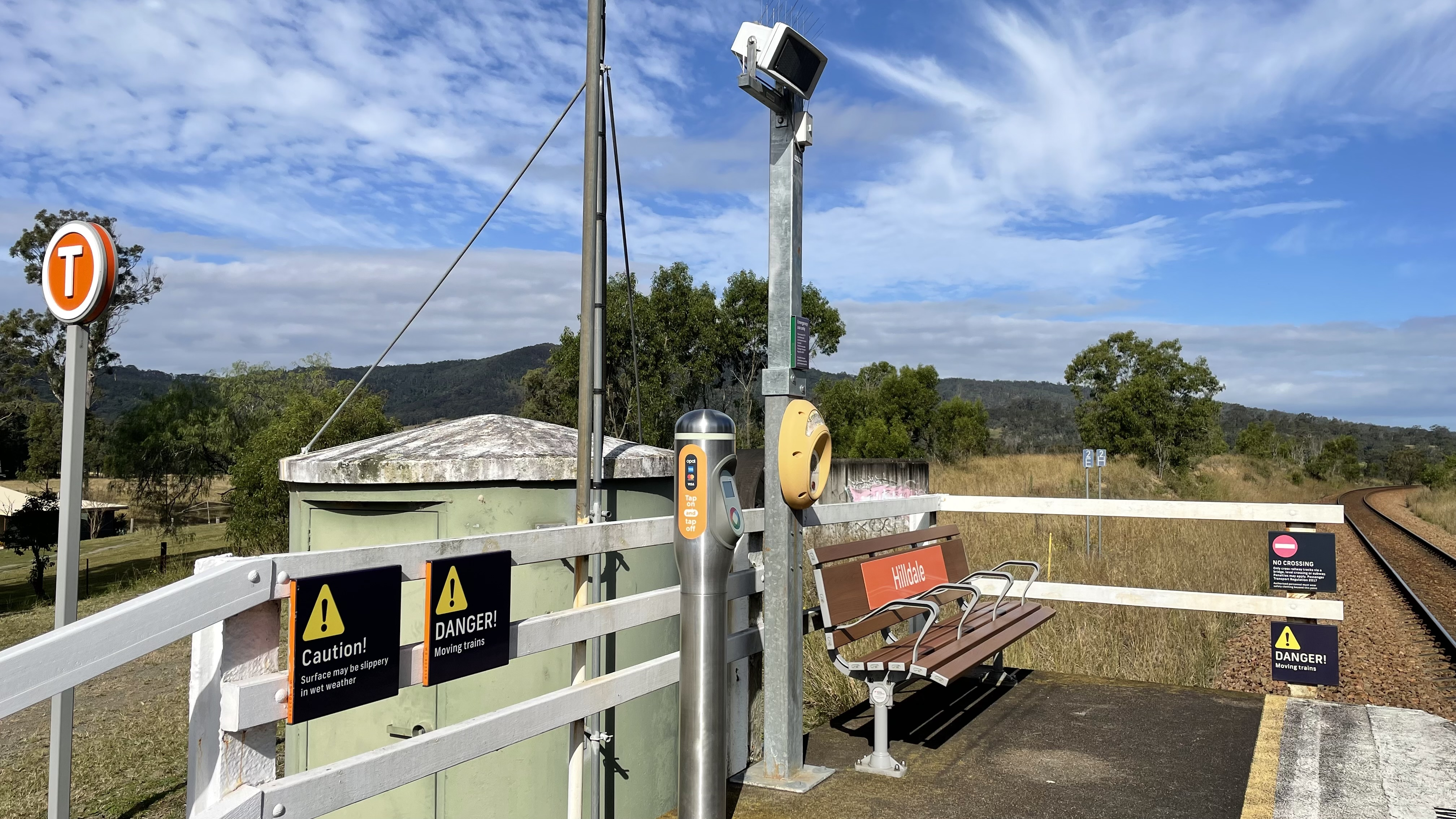
Platform

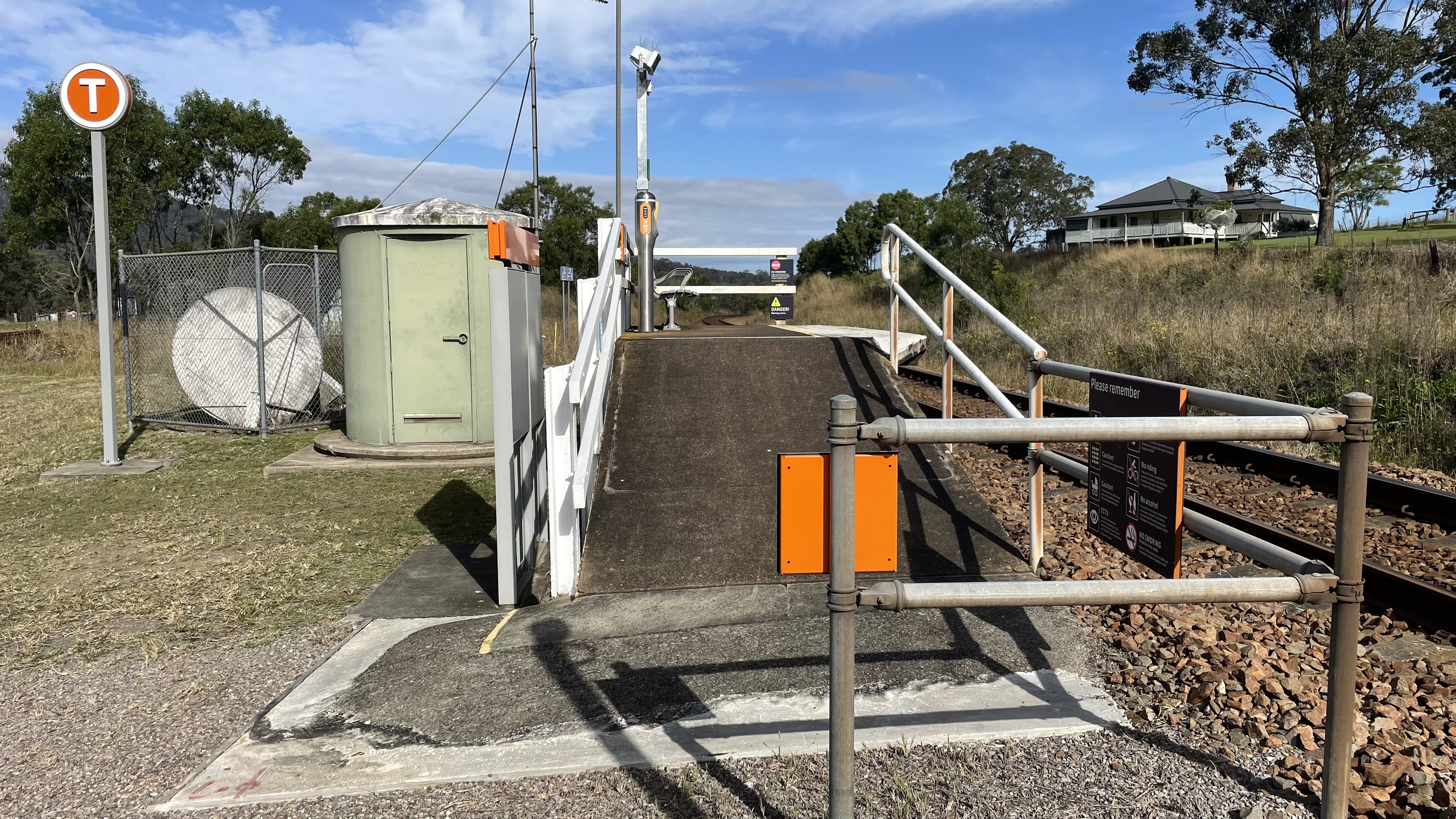
Entrance ramp
