= Tabbil Creek, New South Wales =

Country town in Australia

Tabbil Creek New South Wales
- Coordinates: 32°24′59″S 151°44′25″E
- Population: 53 (SAL 2021)
- Postcode(s): 2420
- Time zone: AEST (UTC+10)
  - Summer (DST): AEDT (UTC+11)
- LGA(s): Dungog Shire
- State electorate(s): Upper Hunter
- Federal division(s): Lyne
Suburbs around Tabbil Creek:
| Sugarloaf | Dungog | Dungog |
| Hanleys Creek | Tabbil Creek | Alison |
| Wirragulla | Wirragulla | Alison |

Tabbil Creek is a small country town located between Dungog and Maitland in the Hunter Region of Australia. Tabbil Creek had a population of 53 people in the 2021 Census. Tabbil Creek includes a cemetery and a golf club.
