= Martins Creek, New South Wales =

Town in New South Wales, Australia

Martins Creek
- Town
- Coordinates: 32°33′36.11″S 151°37′12.48″E
- Country: Australia
- State: New South Wales
- Region: Hunter
- LGA: Dungog
- Location: 195 km (121 mi) N of Sydney; 57 km (35 mi) NW of Newcastle; 26 km (16 mi) SW of Dungog; 29 km (18 mi) NNE of Maitland

Government
  - State electorate: Upper Hunter
  - Federal division: Lyne

Area
  - Total: 33.8 km^{2} (13.1 sq mi)
- Elevation: 27 to 370 m (89 to 1,214 ft)

Population
  - Total: 388 (2016 census)
  - Density: 11.48/km^{2} (29.73/sq mi)
- Time zone: UTC+10 (AEST)
  - Summer (DST): UTC+11 (AEDT)
- Postcode: 2420
- County: Durham
- Parish: Barford
- Mean max temp: 30 °C (86 °F)
- Mean min temp: 6.2 °C (43.2 °F)
- Annual rainfall: 934.2 mm (36.78 in)
Localities around Martins Creek
	Hilldale	Wallarobba
Vacy	Martins Creek	Clarence Town, Glen Oak
	Paterson	Duns Creek

Martins Creek is a small country town located between Dungog and Maitland in the Hunter Region of Australia.

The town is centered on Cory Street, which snakes its way through the centre of the town.

Martins Creek includes a NSW Government Primary School, church, tennis court and club house, public hall, rock quarry and the "skipline" Park, as well as the Martins Creek Rural Fire Brigade station. The Martins Creek railway station lies on the North Coast railway line and has three to five daily NSW TrainLink services south-east to Newcastle and north to Dungog.

== Gostwyck Butter Factory ==
The factory was located on 112 Dungog Road. The site was owned by Raymond Co-Operative Dairy Company. Opened on 18 June 1908. In 1915 Peters American Delicacy Company purchased the butter factory. In 1926 Peters sold the factory back to Raymond Co-Operative Dairy Company. In 1927 the factory closed.
