= Clarence Town, New South Wales =

Clarence Town
- Suburb
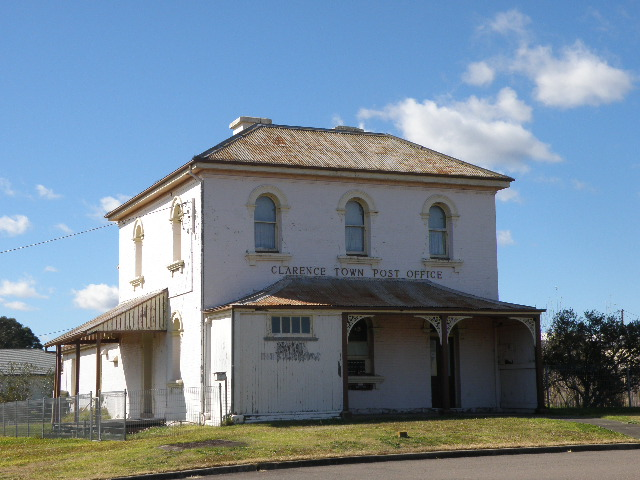
- Clarence Town Post office

- Interactive map of Clarence Town
- Coordinates: 32°35′6.1″S 151°46′39.9″E
- Country: Australia
- State: New South Wales
- Region: Hunter
- LGA: Dungog Shire
- Location: 193 km (120 mi) N of Sydney; 54 km (34 mi) NNW of Newcastle; 34 km (21 mi) NE of Maitland; 28 km (17 mi) N of Raymond Terrace; 23 km (14 mi) S of Dungog

Government
  - State electorate: Upper Hunter
  - Federal division: Lyne
- Elevation: 13 m (43 ft)

Population
  - Totals: ~2,100 (locality) (2006 census)^{Note1} 794 (township) (2006)
- Time zone: UTC+10 (AEST)
  - Summer (DST): UTC+11 (AEDT)
- Postcode: 2321
- County: Durham
- Parish: Uffington
Suburbs around Clarence Town
Wallarobba	Glen Martin	Limeburners Creek
Martins Creek, Glen Oak	Clarence Town	Limeburners Creek, Twelve Mile Creek
Glen Oak	Glen Oak, East Seaham, Balickera	Twelve Mile Creek

Clarence Town is both a primarily rural locality and a township in the Dungog Shire local government area in the Hunter Region of New South Wales, Australia. It is 193 kilometres (120 mi) north of Sydney, 54 km (34 mi) north-north-west of Newcastle, and 28 km (17 mi) from the Pacific Highway at Raymond Terrace. The locality is bisected by the Williams River. The township sits just to the west of the river about 32 km (20 mi) upstream from where it flows into the Hunter River at Raymond Terrace.

== History ==
The area was originally inhabited by the Wanaruah Aboriginal people who called it Erringhi.

The first Europeans to arrive in Clarence Town were William Paterson and explorer Francis Barrellier in 1801 exploring the Hunter River. Convicts were utilised to cut timber in the area. In 1826 after a number of cedar cutters moved to the area a village was created.

The township is most famous for building and launching the William IV paddle steamer in 1831, although the town was still called Erringhi at this time. It was renamed in 1832 after the Duke of Clarence, who became King William IV in 1830.

In 1886 the town was described as:

The land on the river-banks, consisting chiefly of alluvial flats, is remarkably fertile. This is largely due to the floods of past ages. wheat, maize, barley, oats and potatoes are produced in abundance. Tobacco is now grown and the grape and orange are cultivated with success. The population is 370.

There is a hotel in the main street of Clarence Town built in 1913 called The Erringhi Hotel.

== Heritage listings ==
Clarence Town has a number of heritage-listed sites, including:

- 49 Grey Street: Clarence Town Courthouse
- 567 Main Road: Clarence Town Bridge over Williams River

== Demographics ==
In the 2006 census the locality had a population of approximately 2,100 while the township, which is the largest population centre in the area, had a population of 794.

== Township ==
Clarence Town has its own post office (built about 1880), Medical Centre (Clarence Town Medical Centre), a Pharmacy, a Home Hardware store, a Supermarket (IGA), a primary school, several churches, a school of arts hall (which hosts many local events), a soccer club (home of the Clarencetown Cobras), a football field come cricket pitch, a fire station, police station, butcher shop, club, pub and restaurant, a vet, a caravan park on the river and a swimming pool (home of the Clarencetown Comets swimming team). There are also several picnic spots and old houses and buildings to see.

Just out of town a little way is the Good Samaritan Donkey Sanctuary, which cares for mistreated donkeys. Visitors are welcomed; however appointments are required, except on advertised open days.

== Disasters ==
In 2007 devastating floodwaters caused havoc in the Hunter Valley and claimed the lives of two people on a bridge into Clarence Town from Seaham, New South Wales.

== Notes ==
1. The population statistics provided by the Australian Bureau of Statistics for the suburb/locality include persons not actually resident in Clarence Town as well as excluding some Clarence Town residents so the figure shown is an approximation only.
