= Belford railway station, New South Wales =

Former railway station in New South Wales, Australia

Belford
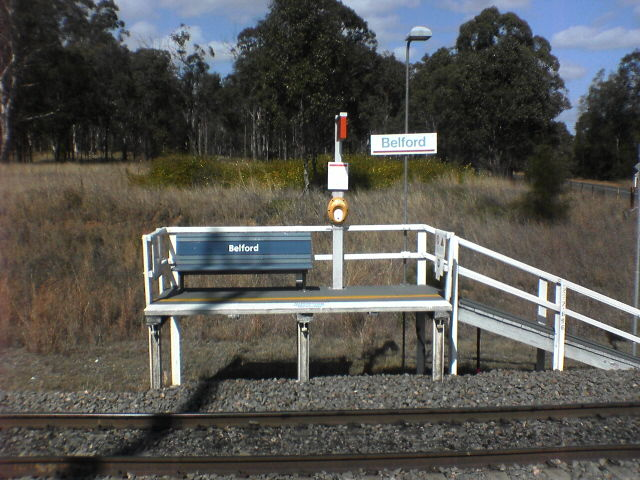

General information
- Coordinates: 32°39′21″S 151°16′30″E
- Line: Main North
- Platforms: 2
- Tracks: 2

Other information
- Status: Closed

History
- Opened: 6 September 1869
- Closed: 4 September 2005

Services
| Preceding station | Former services | Following station |
|---|---|---|
| Minimbah towards Wallangarra | Main Northern Line | Branxton towards Sydney |
Location

Belford railway station was a railway station on the Main North railway line. It served the settlement of Belford in the Hunter Region of New South Wales, Australia. Services were provided by CityRail's Hunter line until 4 September 2005, when the station was closed for safety reasons.

The station consisted of two platforms about three metres long. Until it was closed, the station contained safety features, including lighting and security cameras. Passengers would have to cross the tracks to access both platforms. There is no sign of the station now, which was near the level crossing of Hermitage Road. Nearby is the New England Highway which links Newcastle and Brisbane.
