= Dungog Chronicle =

Twice-weekly newspaper in Dungog, New South Wales, Australia

Dungog Chronicle, originally published as the Durham Chronicle and Dungog & Williams River Advertiser, is a twice weekly English language newspaper published in Dungog, New South Wales, Australia.

== History ==
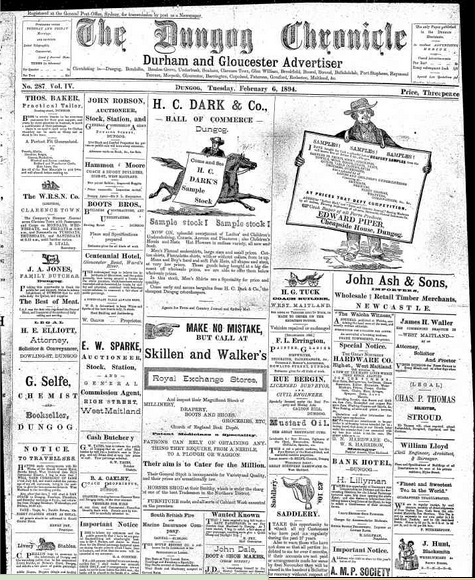
Dungog Chronicle cover, 6 February 1894

The paper was established by Walter Bennett, and under its original title of Durham Chronicle and Dungog and Williams River Advertiser was first published on 12 June 1888. It continued to be published under this title until 28 February 1893. On 7 March 1893 the paper appeared for the first time under its new name The Dungog Chronicle: Durham and Gloucester Advertiser. Early editions of the paper noted that it was "the only paper published in the Durham electorate". In June 2008 the Dungog Chronicle celebrated 120 years since it was first published. It is delivered in paper and electronic format.

In September 2024, Australian Community Media announced it will shutter the paper. However, as of March 2025, it is still being published six times a week.

== Digitisation ==
The paper has been digitised as part of the Australian Newspapers Digitisation Program of the National Library of Australia.

== See also ==
- List of newspapers in Australia
- List of newspapers in New South Wales
