= Belford, New South Wales =

Town in New South Wales, Australia

Coordinates: 32°40′S 151°17′E

Belford is a town in the Hunter Region of New South Wales, Australia. In 2016 it had a population of 171, and a median age of 36.

== Transport ==
Hunter Valley Buses operates one bus route through the town of Belford:

- 180: Singleton Heights to Green Hills Shopping Centre via Branxton, Greta, Lochinvar and Maitland
