= Dungog, New South Wales =

Dungog
- Town
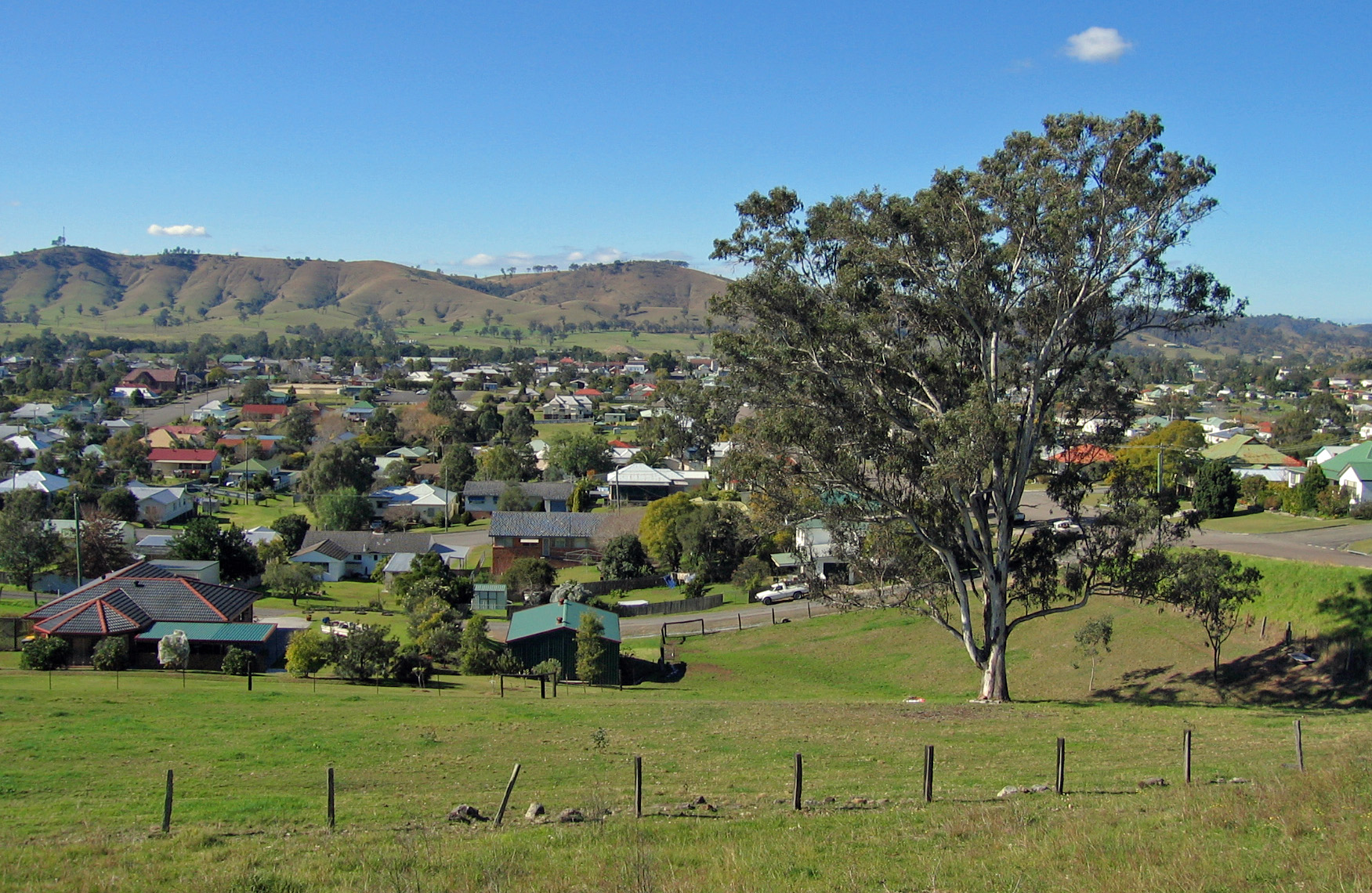
- View of Dungog from Hospital Road

- Coordinates: 32°23′54″S 151°45′09″E
- Country: Australia
- State: New South Wales
- Region: Hunter, Mid North Coast
- LGAs: Dungog Shire; Mid-Coast Council
- Location: 215 km (134 mi) N of Sydney; 76 km (47 mi) NNW of Newcastle; 52 km (32 mi) NNE of Maitland; 51 km (32 mi) N of Raymond Terrace; 61 km (38 mi) SSW of Gloucester
- Established: 1972

Government
  - State electorate: Upper Hunter
  - Federal division: Lyne
- Elevation: 61 m (200 ft)

Population
  - Total: 2,169 (UCL 2021)
  - Density: 7.31/km^{2} (18.9/sq mi)
- Time zone: UTC+10 (AEST)
  - Summer (DST): UTC+11 (AEDT)
- Postcode: 2420
- County: Durham
- Parish: Dungog
- Mean max temp: 28.3 °C (82.9 °F)
- Mean min temp: 3.6 °C (38.5 °F)
- Annual rainfall: 1,151.8 mm (45.35 in)
Localities around Dungog
Sugarloaf	Bendolba, Fosterton	Alison
Tabbil Creek	Dungog	Alison
Tabbil Creek	Tabbil Creek	Alison

Dungog is a country town on the Williams River in the Hunter region and a small part of the Mid North Coast region of New South Wales, Australia. Located in the middle of dairy and timber country, it is the centre of the Dungog Shire Local Government Area and at the 2021 Census it had a population of 9,541. The area includes the Fosterton Loop, 22 kilometres (14 mi) of road, used in the annual Pedalfest. A small portion of Dungog lies in the Mid-Coast Council Local Government Area.

== History ==
The traditional owners of the area now known as Dungog are the Gringai clan, who shared a common language and culture with the neighbouring Worimi and Wonnarua people.

From around 1815, cedar-getters and then pastoralists with their convict labourers taking up land grants, made their way up the river, displacing and killing the Gringai, with most survivors being forced into the margins of colonial society or into the upper reaches of the river. British settlements such as Raymond Terrace, Clarence Town and Dungog replaced their communities.

By 1827 the region had been explored by the British as far as the Barrington area, while surveyor Thomas Florance named the Chichester River. Two years later George Boyle White explored the sources of the Allyn and Williams rivers. Grants along the Williams followed to men such as Duncan Mackay, John Verge, James Dowling (later a NSW Chief Justice) and others, who, with their assigned convicts, began clearing land and building houses around a district that was by the early 1830s centred on a small settlement first known as Upper William. With a Court of Petty Sessions in 1833 and gazetted in 1838 as the village of Dungog (a local Gringai word, possibly meaning "clear hills"), it had a court house, lockup and an increasing number of inns, shops and houses.

By 1834 it was estimated that up to 500 Gringai people had perished since the onset of colonisation and that the survivors faced "certain annihilation". In 1835 a Gringai man, known only as Charley, was arrested for his role in the death of five convict shepherds working for Robert Mackenzie, later premier of Queensland, at Rawdon Vale, north of Dungog. A large number of Gringai in the Barrington region were subsequently massacred in retribution. Charley was spared, faced court and was sentenced to death. It was decided that he should be hanged in Dungog. In the only legal execution enacted at Dungog, Charley was publicly hanged outside the courthouse on 4 September 1835.

Lord Street, as were Dowling, Mackay, Chapman, Hooke, Brown and Myles, were all named after landowners at the time surveyor Francis Rusden drew up his generous 1838 grid plan of Dungog's streets. The descendants of some of these, notably the Dowlings, Mackays and Hookes, still live in and around Dungog. Others, such as John Lord, went bankrupt or, as did Myles, sold out early and moved to Sydney.

Dungog village gradually grew from a mere 25 houses in the 1846 Census (three of stone or brick). By 1854, four licences for publicans were granted in Dungog: James Stephenson, Dungog Inn; Joseph Finch, Settlers' Arms; Joseph Robson, Trades' Arms; and Edward Tate, Durham Hotel. Two of these continue to operate today.

The plan and street pattern of 1838 gave Dungog generous sized lots that, over the years, have allowed people to build homes with ample space in between, as well as to enjoy cow and horse paddocks close by. Before the 1920s there was relatively little building beyond Lord St. John Wilson, born in Dungog in 1854, described the town as a 'sea of bush and scrub, with a house here and there', and with bullock teams and drays having 'to wend their way between stumps and saplings'. Even in 1892, at the opening of Dungog Cottage Hospital on Hospital Hill to the west, the trek up was largely through open countryside.

As British colonisation of the region consolidated, the Gringai became fringe dwellers, camping on the edges of towns such as Dungog. Some Gringai identities such as "Doughboy Billy", "Brandy" and "Nancy Green" were designated as the so-called "King of their tribe" or "Last of their tribe". When they died most were buried at the "blacks' cemetery" on the Violet Hill property of the Abbott family behind the old rectory building on what is now the corner of Myles and Verge Streets in Dungog. The surviving younger generation of Gringai at this time were deemed a nuisance. Two young boys who were begging on Fosterton Road near Dungog were poisoned to death when they were given food deliberately laced with toxic substances. This event was not regarded as important enough for an enquiry.

Boosted by the dairy industry, which began to develop in the 1890s, Dungog grew more rapidly, receiving a further boost with the arrival of the railway in 1911. Many of the finest houses and commercial buildings still to be seen here were built between the end of the nineteenth and the first two decades of the following century. Coolalie (206 Dowling St) and Coimbra (72 Dowling St), as well as the then Angus & Coote, now J A Rose building (146-148 Dowling St) and the Dark stores (184-190 Dowling St) all date from this period of expansion. All, as the Dungog Chronicle continuously proclaimed, were 'up to date', and as the Dungog Chronicle also pointed out, modern improvements such as the 'water service and electric light service has made Dungog a desirable place to live in'. The architects and builders used for these projects were locals; such as C H Button, Town Clerk and architect, or J A Hall, builder, as well as those from Maitland, such as architect J A Pender.

Around 1926, Dowling Street was first fully kerbed and the present alignment of the shop facades was established. Money and new businesses were entering the town at this time. While things may have slowed a little thereafter, many new buildings and houses continued to be built in the following years. The Catholic community built a new place of worship in Brown St in 1933, replacing the church that had stood in Dowling St since 1870 (where the Tall Timbers Motel now stands). In 1935 the Bank of NSW replaced its old building on the corner of Dowling and Mackay Streets with one in the, then, very modern Georgian Revival Style.

World War II was just beginning when the Dungog Chronicle reported: "Recent weeks have seen a progressive building campaign in Dungog. Apart from the palatial new building for the Royal Hotel erected and furnished at a cost of some £20,000, and remodelling of the Court House Hotel and Bank Hotel, nine new residences have been completed within the past month. In addition to these works, the Education Department is clearing and grading the playing grounds at the public school, and has erected an ornate brick fence along those grounds on the Dowling-street frontage, whilst the Municipal Council has had two chains of kerbing and guttering carried out in Mary-street."

Since the 1950s, few new public buildings and shops have been erected but homes have continued to be built in weatherboard, brick, fibro or concrete; following the fashions of the time. While dairying has declined, the beef industry has remained, and although most timber is now locked up in national parks, many visitors come these days to enjoy the area's natural beauty. This trend has also meant that numerous older homes have been saved from deterioration by 'tree-changers', who have increasingly bought and renovated older homes in Dungog and its surrounding countryside.

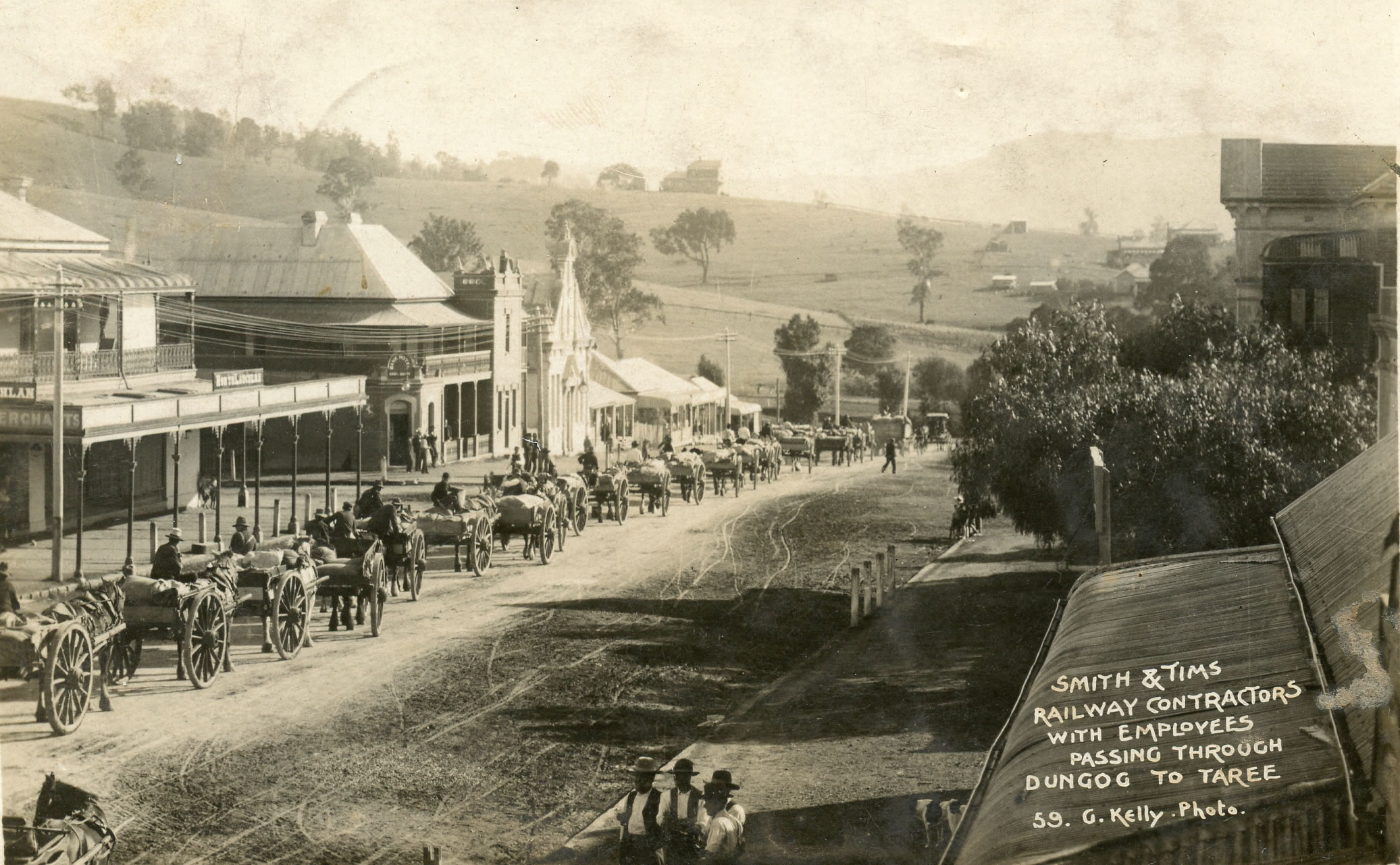
Smith & Tims railway contractors with employees passing through Dungog to Taree, 1909.

== Heritage listings ==
Dungog has a number of heritage-listed sites, including:

- 101 Main Road: Cooreei Bridge over Williams River
- Lord Street: Dungog Courthouse and Residence
- 6 Brown Street: Dungog Picture Theatre (James Theatre)

== Climate ==
Dungog has a mild humid subtropical climate (Cfa) with warm summers and cool winters.

Climate data for Chichester Dam, 1938–1956
Month	Jan	Feb	Mar	Apr	May	Jun	Jul	Aug	Sep	Oct	Nov	Dec	Year
Mean daily maximum °C (°F)	26.2 (79.2)	24.9 (76.8)	23.3 (73.9)	20.2 (68.4)	17.4 (63.3)	14.2 (57.6)	13.7 (56.7)	15.5 (59.9)	19.1 (66.4)	21.4 (70.5)	24.1 (75.4)	26.6 (79.9)	20.6 (69.1)
Mean daily minimum °C (°F)	16.7 (62.1)	16.7 (62.1)	16.2 (61.2)	12.7 (54.9)	9.7 (49.5)	7.0 (44.6)	6.2 (43.2)	6.9 (44.4)	9.8 (49.6)	12.1 (53.8)	14.9 (58.8)	17.2 (63.0)	12.2 (54.0)
Average precipitation mm (inches)	161.9 (6.37)	180.9 (7.12)	173.6 (6.83)	101.3 (3.99)	91.9 (3.62)	103.8 (4.09)	52.1 (2.05)	59.4 (2.34)	61.1 (2.41)	90.8 (3.57)	106.5 (4.19)	124.8 (4.91)	1,311.3 (51.63)
Average precipitation days	12.4	13.0	13.2	10.4	10.5	11.4	9.4	8.4	8.4	10.3	11.1	11.7	130.2

== Demographics ==
According to the 2021 census, there were 2,169 people in Dungog.

- Aboriginal and Torres Strait Islander people made up 9.5% of the population.
- 90.8% of people were born in Australia; the next most common countries of birth included England 1.6%, Germany 0.4%, Scotland 0.4%, New Zealand 0.3%, and the United States of America 0.3%.
- 95.1% of people spoke only English at home; the next most common languages spoken at home included Afrikaans 0.1%, and Mandarin 0.1%.
- The most common responses for religion included No Religion 33.2%, Anglican 23.7%, Catholic 17.5%, and Presbyterian and Reformed 6.1; a further 6.4% of respondents for this area elected not to disclose their religious status.

Historical population
Year	Pop.	±%
1921	1,770	—
1933	2,128	+20.2%
1947	2,041	−4.1%
1954	2,154	+5.5%
1961	2,211	+2.6%
1966	2,101	−5.0%
1971	2,122	+1.0%
1976	2,175	+2.5%
1981	2,126	−2.3%
1986	2,106	−0.9%
1991	2,187	+3.8%
1996	2,181	−0.3%
2001	2,116	−3.0%
2006	2,102	−0.7%
2011	2,132	+1.4%
2016	2,159	+1.3%
2021	2,169	+0.5%
Source: Australian Bureau of Statistics data.

== Culture ==
Popular Dungog events are the Dungog Film Festival hosted at the James Theatre, the Dungog Agricultural Show, Pedalfest, the Dungog Rodeo, and the Thunderbolt Rally. Each of these events showcase local produce and talent and bring tourists to the region.

=== James Theatre ===
Dungog is the home of the James Theatre, the oldest fully enclosed purpose-built cinema continuously operating in Australia, located at 6 Brown Street. It receives new movie releases soon after cinemas in more populated areas. The Dungog Film Society has been operating from the cinema since 1992 and screens fine films monthly to locals as well as bringing Flickerfest to Dungog and an AGOG weekend of foreign films in September. The theatre is the venue for the Dungog Film Festival, which is held annually.

The theatre was first opened on land of James Stuart in December 1912. Originally an open-air theatre, it was roofed by 1914 and in 1918 an enclosed hall built. In order to accommodate "talkie" movies and to provide improved dance facilities, Stuart commissioned major reconstruction works that commenced in 1930. These works were designed by the Newcastle architect, William Jeater.

The reconstruction works included construction of a stage, remodelling the street façade into the Spanish Mission Style, a new dance floor, new northern entrance, a projection room above the foyer and seating arrangement for 400.

It retains the simplicity of a Picture Theatre built in a small country town during the Great Depression. The building is architecturally significant as one of only four Picture Theatres in the New South Wales with Spanish Mission Style facades. The James Theatre Dungog Community Centre has been owned by the Dungog Shire Council since 1979.

=== Dungog Film Festival ===
The Dungog Film Festival, inaugurated on 31 May 2007, was a film festival which served the dual purposes of encouraging the local tourism industry and showcasing Australian cinema. It used to take place over four days and some of the proceeds went towards preserving the James Theatre. It used to be held annually in May and was open to Australian filmmakers only. It did not operate in 2013 and in 2014 was replaced by the broader festival of the arts, the Dungog Festival, which is now held on the October Long Weekend.

In 2014, the State Government announced a three year investment to keep the Dungog Film Festival running. As of 2024 the Dungog Film Festival is no longer active.

The screenings were shown in local venues including the James Theatre and the RSL auditorium.

=== Gentlemen of the Road ===
Dungog hosted the 'Gentlemen of the Road' music festival on 20 October 2012. The Gentlemen of the Road is a single performance special event organised by band Mumford and Sons, for which they select a remote town in the country they are touring and hold a day-long music festival featuring local artists and bands with which they are friends. The "Dungog Stopover" featured Husky, Matt Corby, Willy Mason, Sarah Blasko, Yacht Club DJs, Edward Sharpe and the Magnetic Zeros, and headline act Mumford and Sons. Over 13,000 people attended the event held in the town's showground. Attendees were accommodated on campgrounds at the edge of the town, while the band members and entourages stayed at motels and pubs in Dungog.

== Education ==
Dungog High School has approximately 680 students, Children from nearly all of the surrounding towns (e.g.: Clarence Town, Gresford, Paterson, Vacy, Wallarobba, Martins Creek, East Gresford, and Glen Martin) attend.

== Historical Society and museum ==
Founded in 1963, Dungog Historical Society is located in the former School of Arts building which also houses the Dungog Museum. The wide collection showcases Dungog's history and heritage, including information and material about local aboriginal people and family history.

The core of the display is Dungog: The Making of a Community, telling the story of Dungog via different themes. The colourful panels were produced with a grant from the NSW Ministry of the Arts. Temporary exhibitions are also held.

== Rail transport ==
The town's railway station has been served by the North Coast railway line since 1911. The Great White Train visit in August 1926 was attended by a large crowd. There are three to five intercity Hunter Line and four long-distance NSW TrainLink XPT services from Dungog each day.

== Sport ==
=== Dungog Soccer Club – "The Boomerangs" ===
Dungog is the home of Dungog Soccer Club. Nicknamed the "Boomerangs", Dungog compete in the Zone League competitions in the Northern NSW Football Federation. The Club has a strongly established juniors-base with 10 teams competing in competitions across the Hunter Valley.

=== Other sports ===
Dungog also has a Rugby League club called the Dungog Warriors which has teams competing in junior and senior competitions. Additionally, Dungog has a Pony Club, a Cricket Club and a Netball Association who play a Port Stephens Netball Association in Raymond Terrace.

The town has 6 tennis courts which serve for children's tennis coaching in addition to primary and high school competitions. Many residents ride horses and compete in local rodeos.

== Notable persons ==
- Kevin Bacon – Olympic equestrian
- Alyson Best – Actress
- Tallis Duncan – Rugby league player
- Reginald Golledge – Geographer
- Patrick Kenniff – Bushranger
- Henry Porter – Rugby league player and coach
- Dave Sands – One of Australia's well known boxers, was killed near Dungog in 1952 aged 26.
- Tony Townsend – Rugby league player
- Doug Walters – Cricketer
