= Dungog railway station =

Railway station in New South Wales, Australia

Dungog
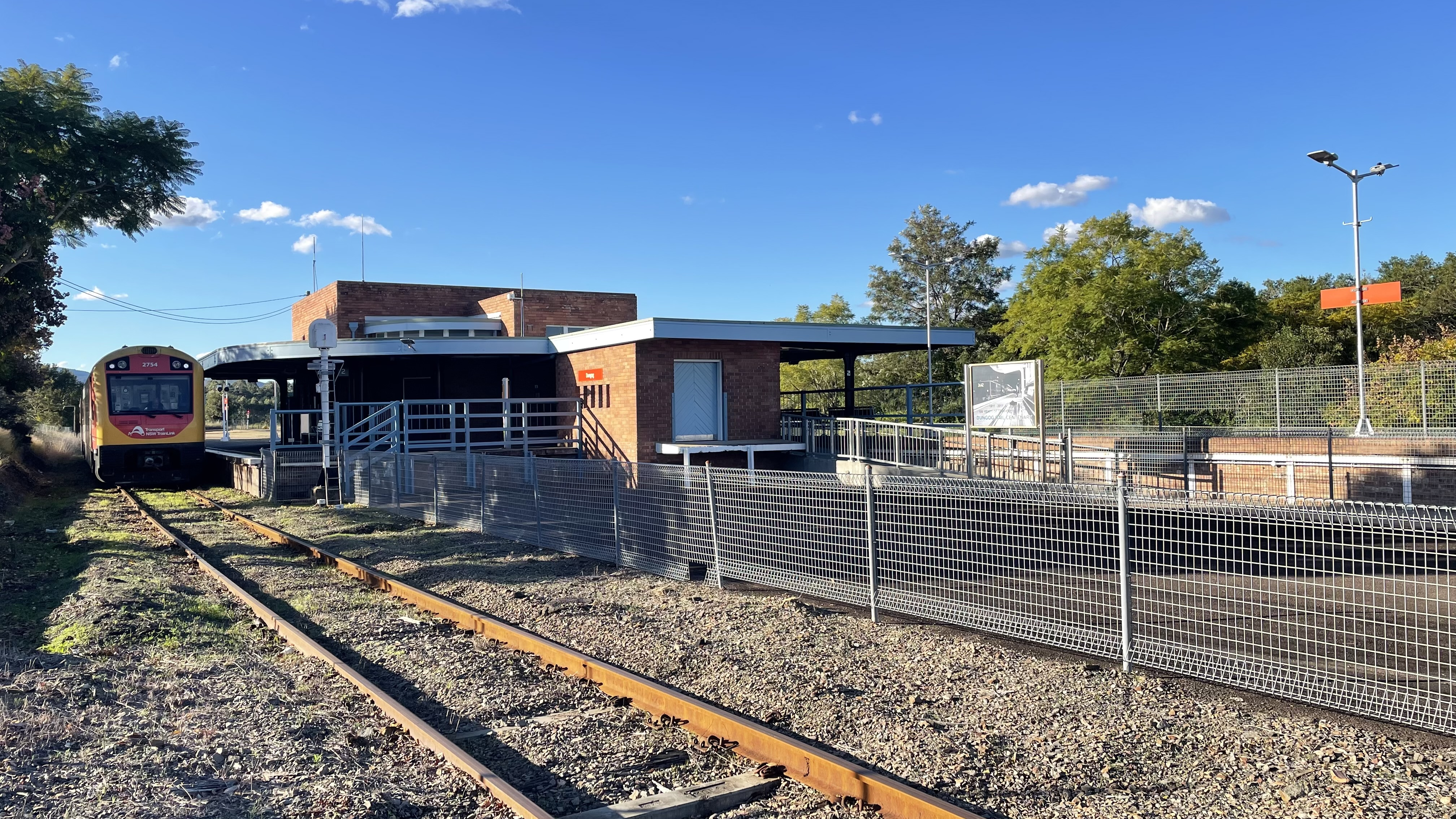
- Station platforms, June 2024

General information
- Location: Brown Street, Dungog; Australia
- Coordinates: 32°24′07″S 151°45′34″E
- Elevation: 2 metres (6 ft 7 in)
- Owner: Transport Asset Manager of New South Wales
- Operator: Sydney Trains
- Line: North Coast
- Distance: 245.20 km (152.36 mi) from Central
- Platforms: 2 (1 island)
- Tracks: 3

Construction
- Structure type: Ground
- Parking: 22 spots
- Accessible: Assisted access

Other information
- Status: Weekdays: Staffed: 6am–11am, 2pm–7.30pm: Weekends and public holidays: Unstaffed
- Station code: DGG
- Website: Transport for NSW

History
- Opened: 14 April 1911; 115 years ago

Passengers
- 2025: 10,346 (year); 28 (daily) (Sydney Trains, NSW TrainLink)

Services
Preceding station	Intercity Trains	Following station
Terminus	Hunter Line	Wirragulla towards Newcastle Interchange
Preceding station	NSW TrainLink	Following station
Gloucester towards Grafton, Casino or Brisbane	NSW TrainLink North Coast Line	Maitland towards Sydney
Former services
Preceding station	Former services	Following station
Dingadee towards Brisbane	North Coast Line (1913–1975)	Wirragulla towards Maitland
Location

Dungog railway station is located on the North Coast line in New South Wales, Australia. It serves the town of Dungog opening on 14 August 1911. Originally built with only one face, in 1944 the platform was converted to an island platform and the present station building constructed.

== Platforms and services ==
Dungog has an island platform with two faces. It also has a passing loop to the east of the station. It is the terminating point for Hunter Line services from Newcastle and a stopping point for NSW TrainLink XPT services. There are five local services to/from Newcastle on weekdays, with three per day on weekends and public holidays. Each day northbound XPT services operate to Casino and Brisbane, with two southbound services operating to Sydney. This station is a request stop for the southbound Casino XPT, so this service stops here only if passengers booked to board/alight here.

Platform	Line	Stopping pattern	Notes
1	North Coast Region	services to Casino & Brisbane (all 1 per day) & Sydney (2 per day)	southbound Casino XPT request stop (booked passengers only)
2	HUN	services to Newcastle (3–5 per day)	1 afternoon weekday service does not stop at Mindaribba
2	HUN	Terminating services	

== Gallery ==
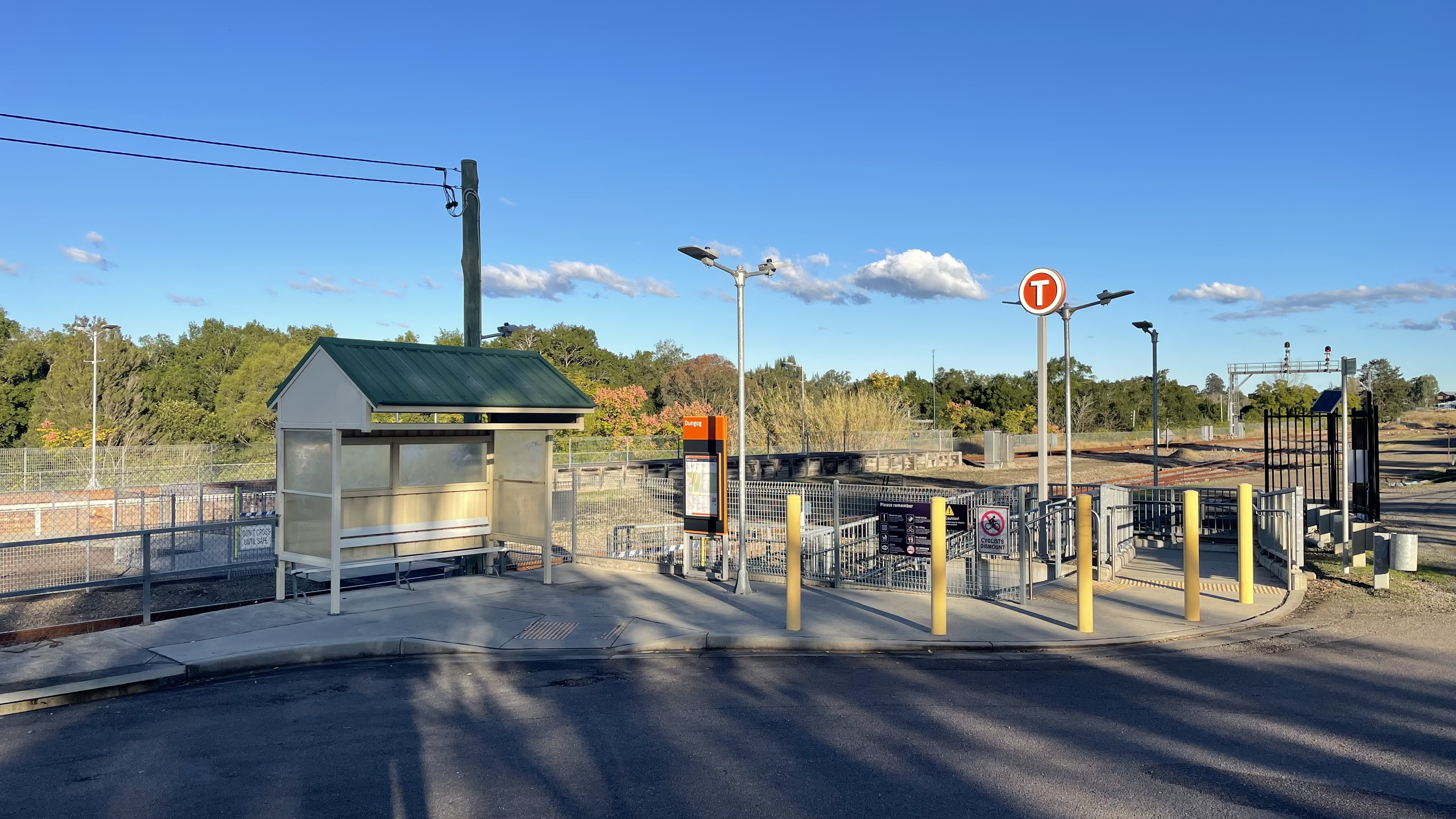
Bus stop & Entrance

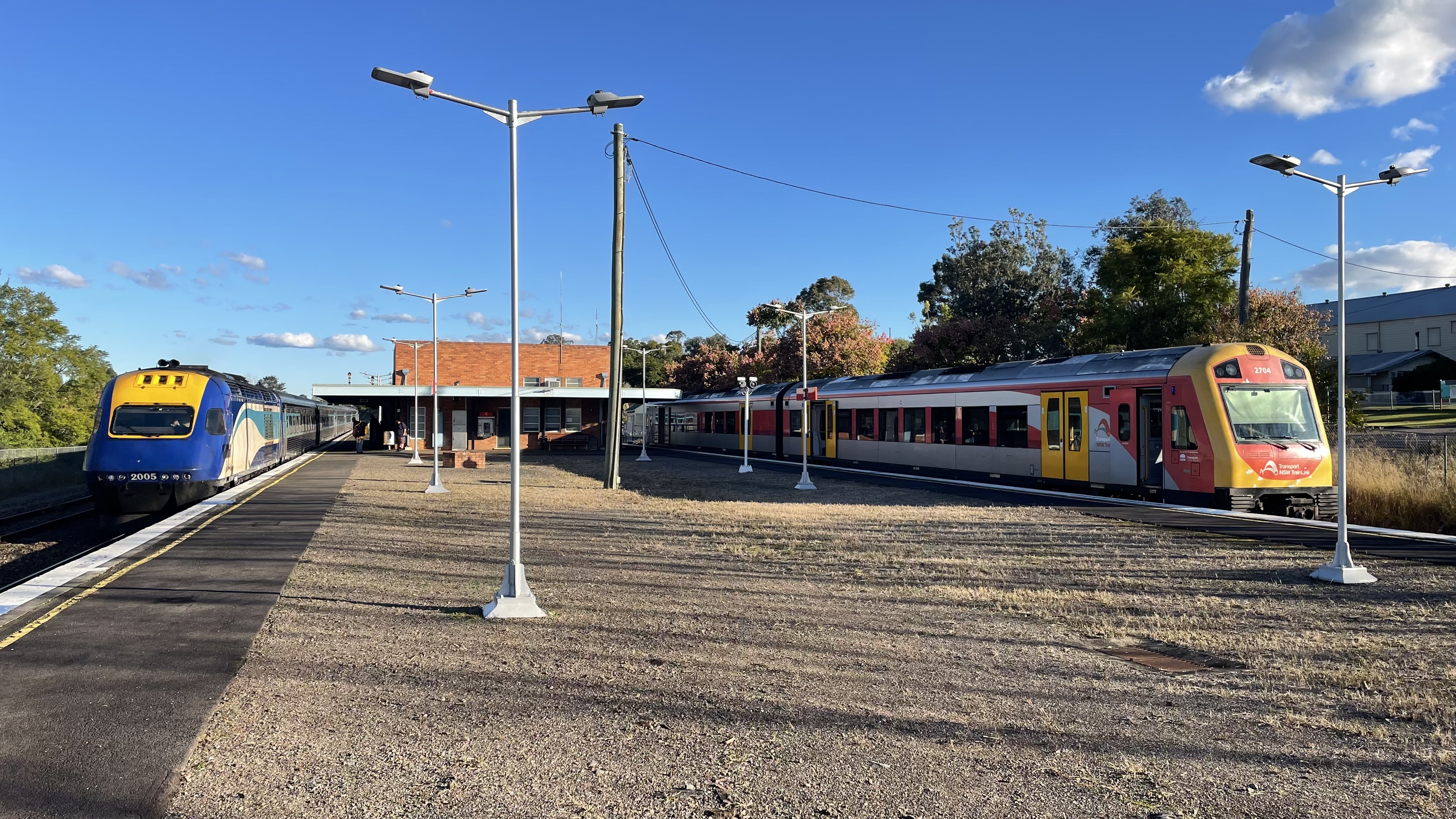
Southbound view with XPT on Platform 1 & Hunter Railcar on Platform 2

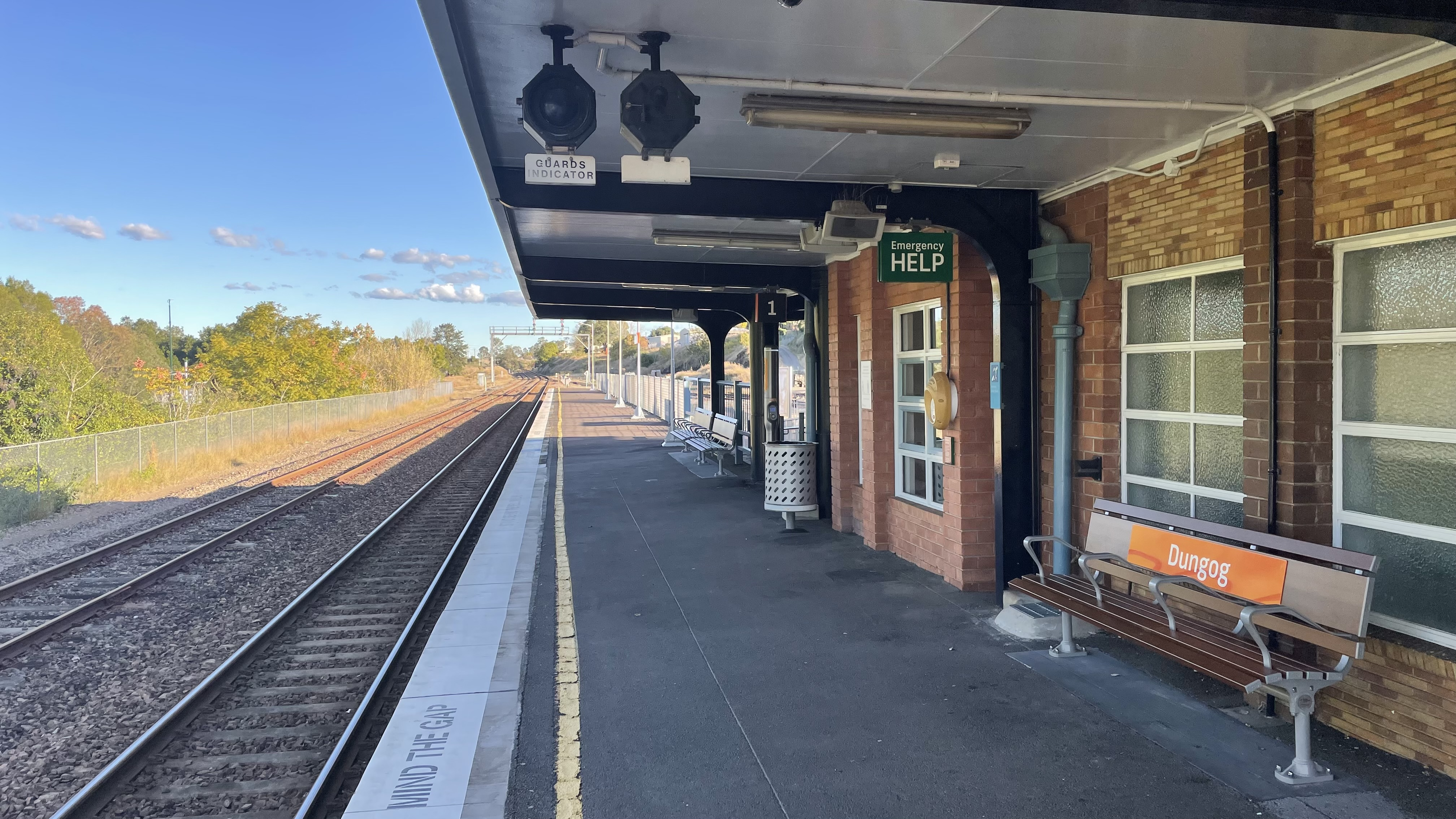
Platform 1 looking southbound

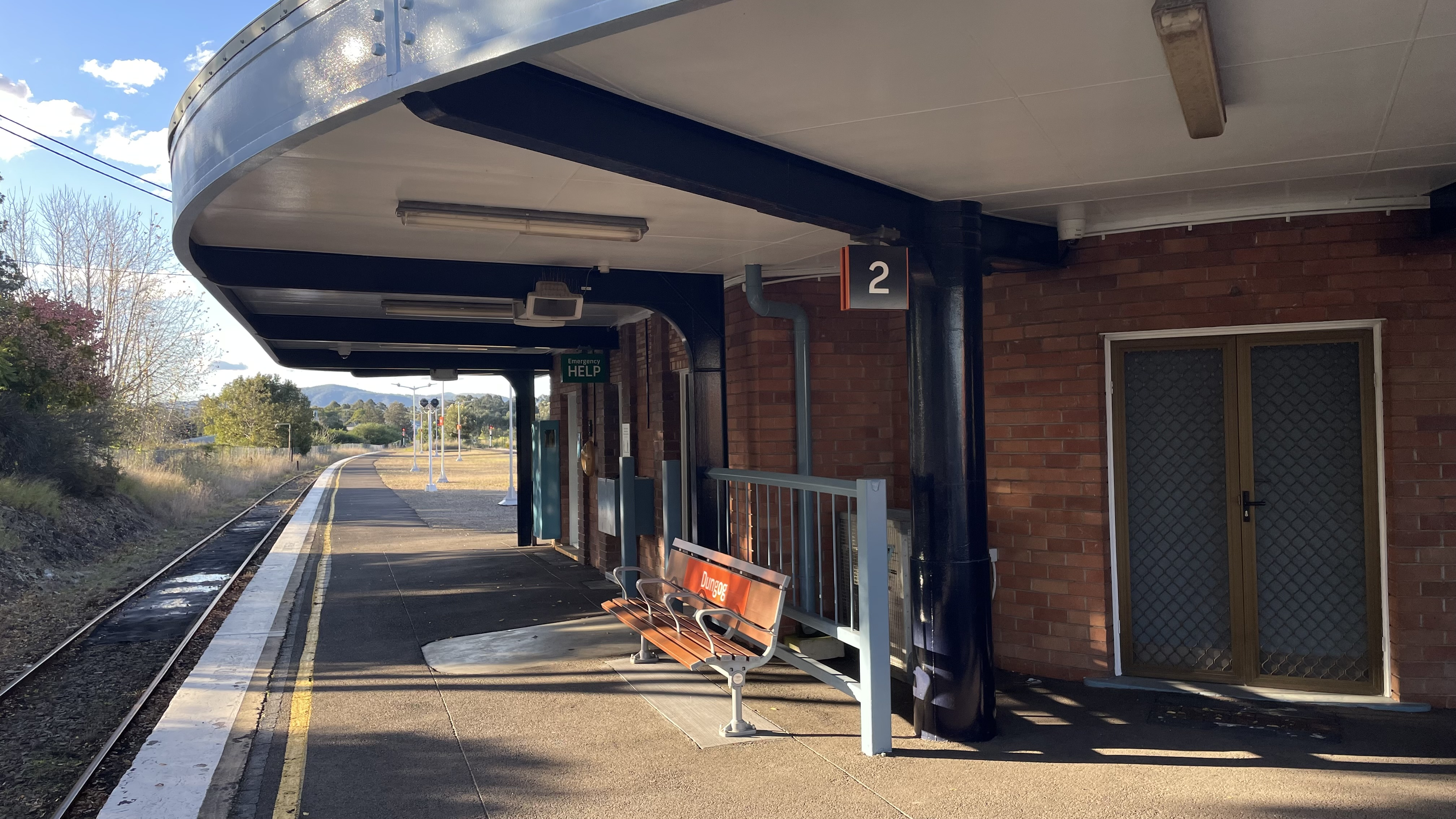
Platform 2 looking northbound

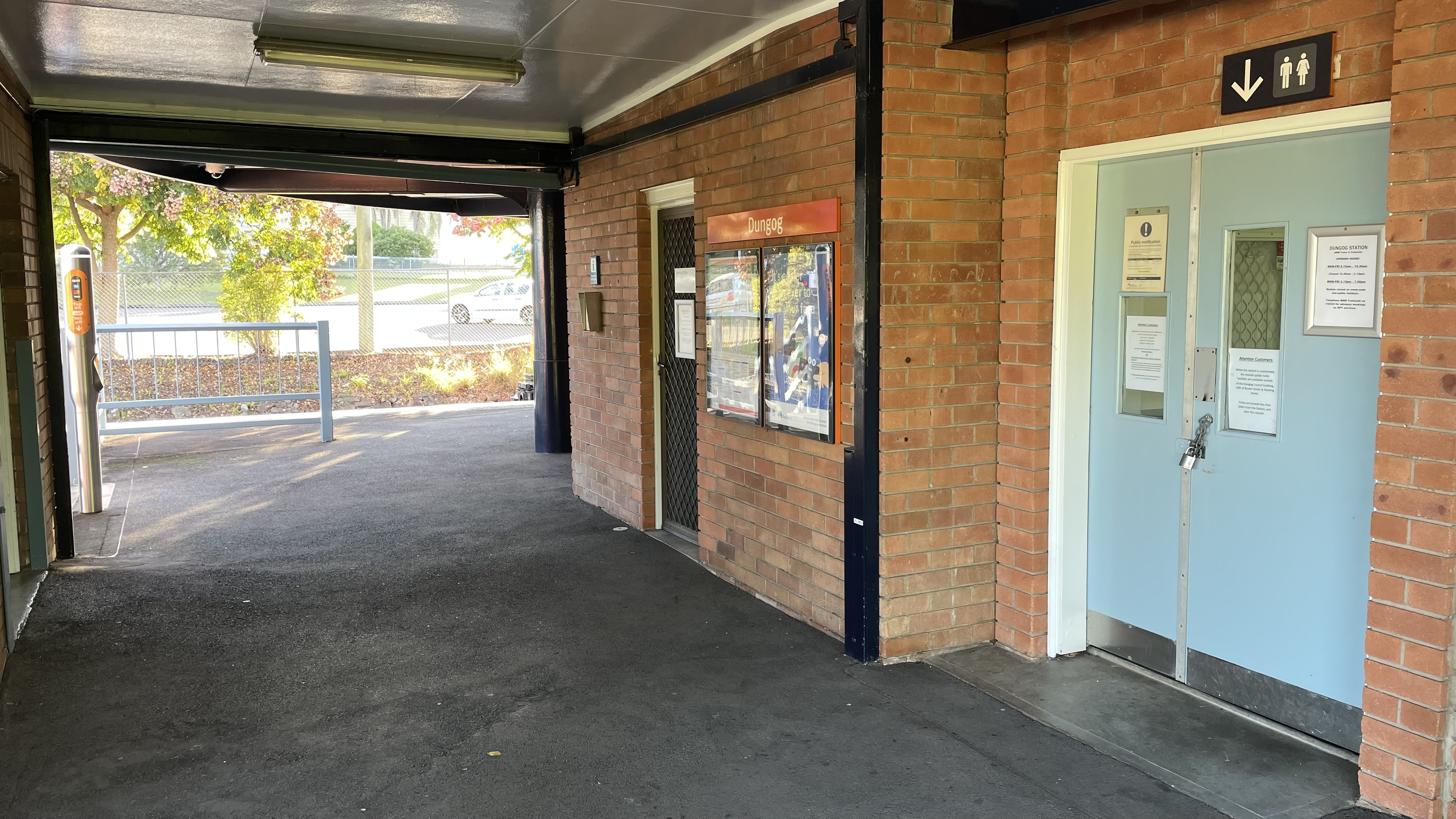
Undercover area linking platforms & entrance to station building

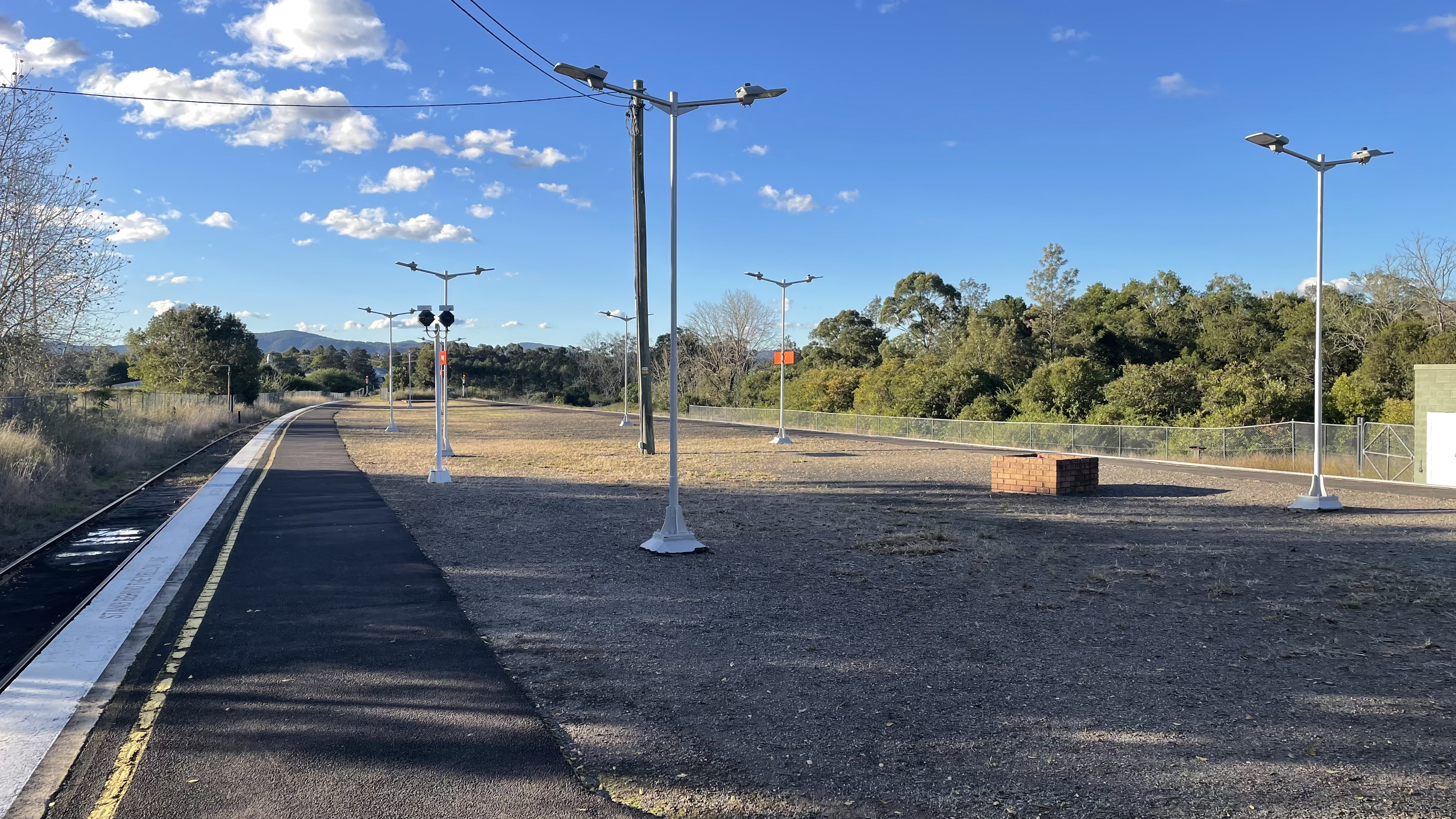
Northbound view from Island platform
