= Main Northern railway line =

Train line in New South Wales, Australia

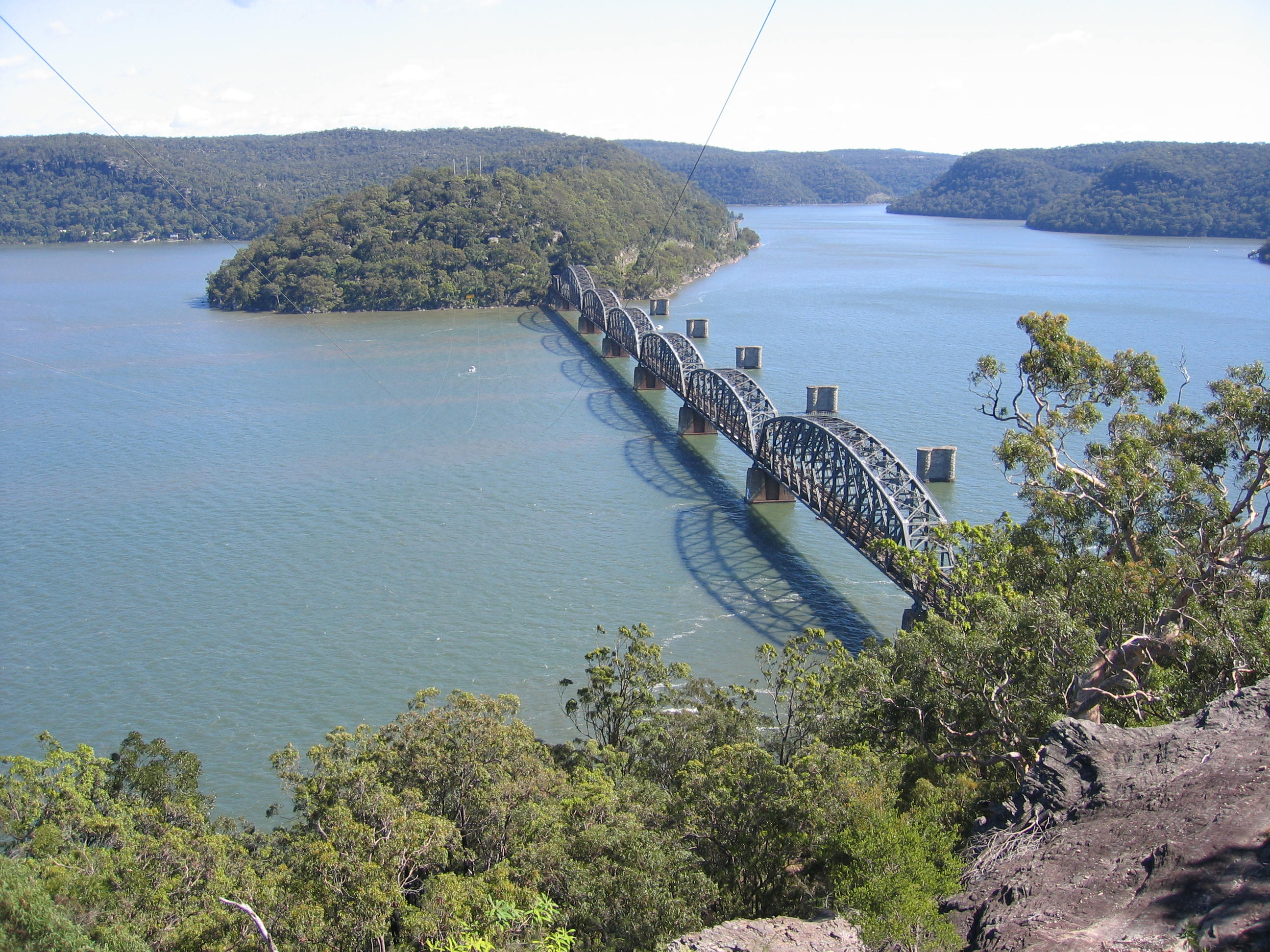
- Hawkesbury River Railway Bridge

Overview
- Termini: Strathfield; Armidale

Technical
- Line length: 781 km (485 mi)
- Track gauge: 1,435 mm (4 ft 8 1/2 in)
- Electrification: 1,500 V DC (up to Islington Junction)
- Highest elevation: 1,363 m (4,472 ft)

The Main Northern railway line, also known as the Great Northern Railway, is a major railway in New South Wales, Australia, running from Strathfield in Sydney to Armidale.

The 1980s saw the line closed progressively north of Armidale; passenger services north of Tamworth were cancelled in 1990 but were reintroduced as far as the former two years later.

The Sydney–Brisbane rail corridor now branches off the Great Northern Railway after Maitland and follows the North Coast line.

== Description of route ==
The line starts as a branch off the Main Suburban line at Strathfield in Sydney. The line heads north as a quadruple track electrified line to Rhodes, crossing the John Whitton Bridge over the Parramatta River as a double track line. At West Ryde the line again expands out to four tracks through to Epping. The line is then largely double track through the northern suburbs of Sydney, crossing the Hawkesbury River Railway Bridge, before passing through the Central Coast.

At Fassifern, a former branch line to Toronto divided off in an eastwards direction until being closed in 1990. The line continues north to Broadmeadow in the inner western suburbs of Newcastle. North of Broadmeadow is the junction with the Newcastle branch line, where electrification of the main line ends. However, electrification continues along the branch line to Newcastle Interchange terminus at Wickham, with the branch line beyond Wickham to the former Newcastle station having been closed and lifted from December 2014.

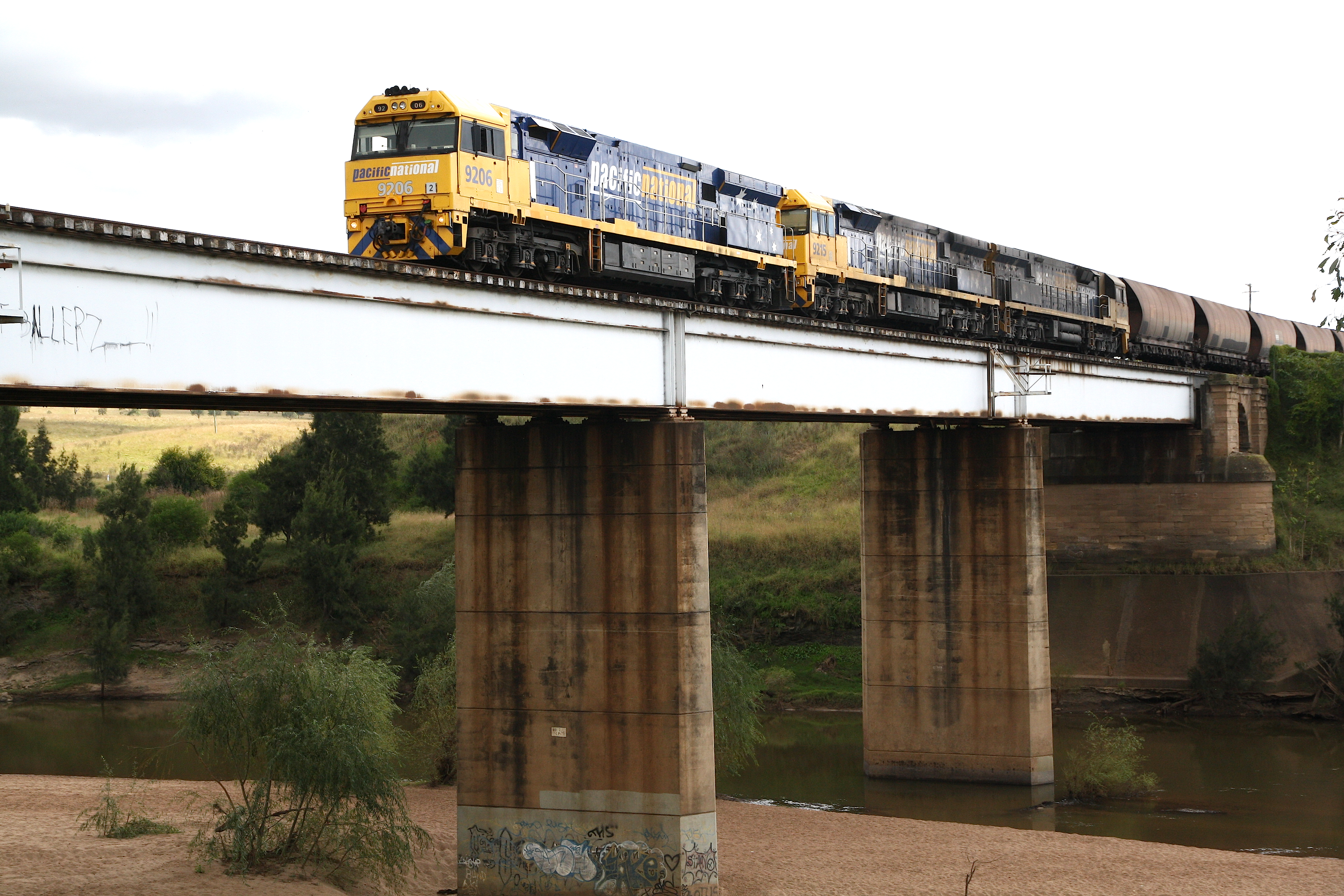
Pacific National 92 class locomotives hauling a coal train over the Hunter River at Singleton

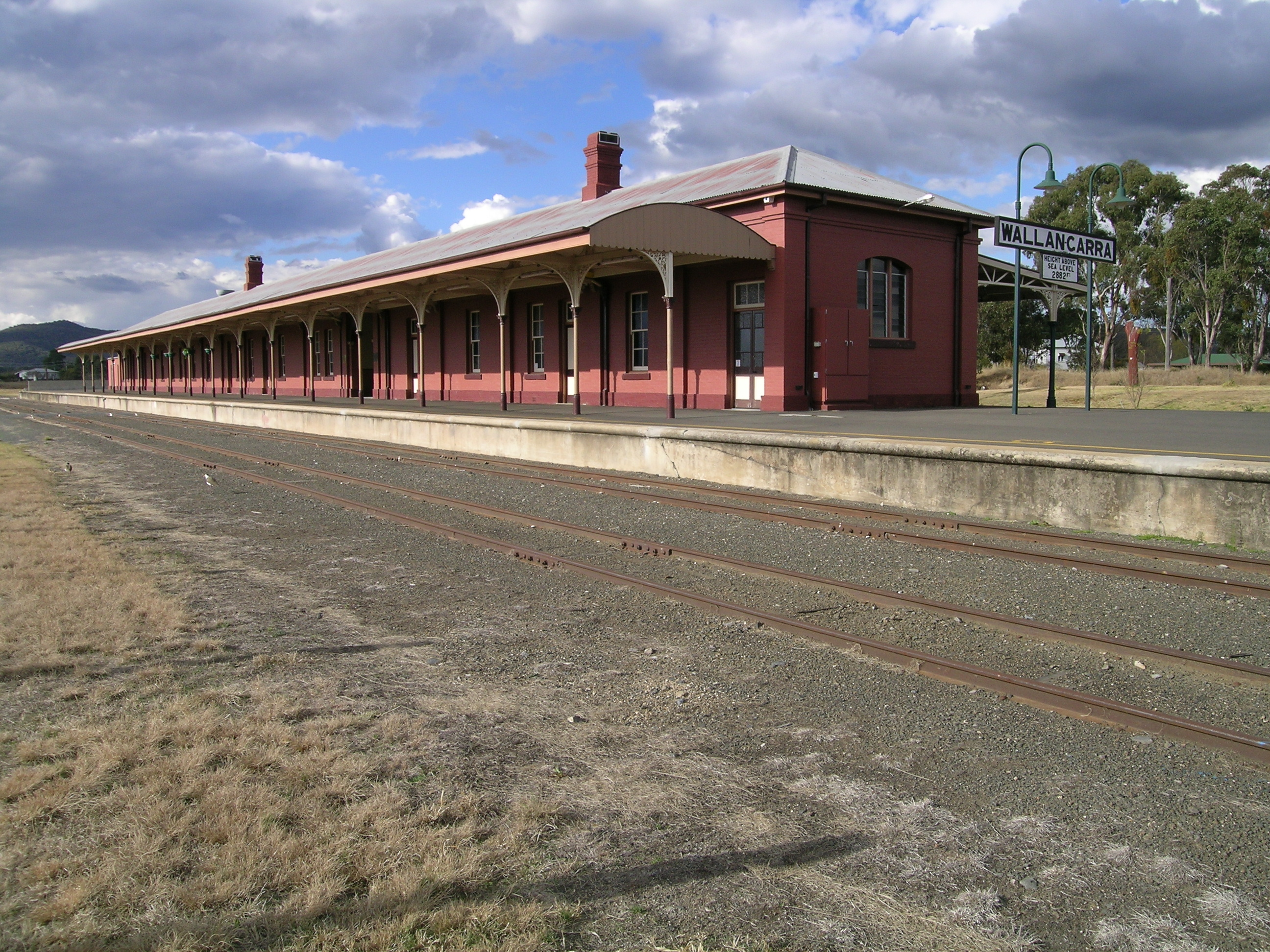
Wallangarra station

The line then swings westwards as four tracks; two main line and two coal roads traverse the outer suburbs of Newcastle to Maitland. The two coal roads run to the Newcastle coal lines, which serve a number of collieries along the route. Maitland is the junction of the North Coast line which continues to Brisbane and the Main North line. The line becomes double track immediately west of Maitland and heads through the Upper Hunter Valley townships of Branxton, Singleton and Muswellbrook where the double track ends.

Muswellbrook is the junction point for the branch to Merriwa, which forms part of the cross country line to Gulgong. The Main North continues northwards through the Ardglen Tunnel to Werris Creek, where the Mungindi Line branches off to Moree, and a former cross country branch continues to Binnaway and ultimately Dubbo.

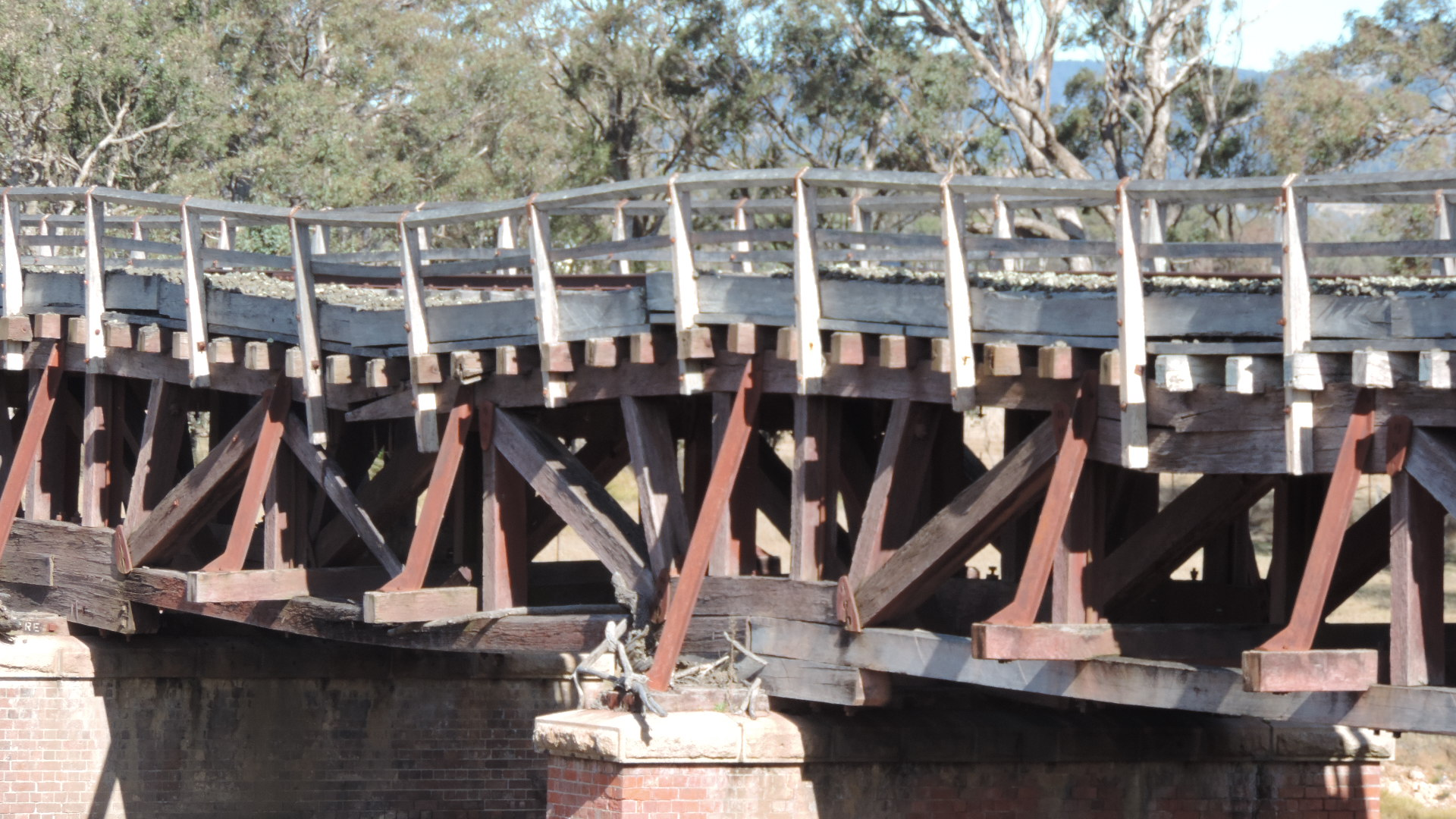
Sunnyside rail bridge over Tenterfield Creek has fallen into disrepair, 2015

The line continues north, but sees limited traffic beyond Werris Creek. The line reaches the major New England towns of Tamworth and Armidale, the latter being the northernmost extent of service on the line. Until the mid-2000s freight traffic continued to the disused station at Dumaresq which is home to a now-also-disused agricultural fertilizer depot. There is now wire across the corridor at several points between Armidale and Dumaresq, after which the line is closed. A block is placed across the tracks a short distance from Dumaresq, at the 590 kilometre mark. North of Glen Innes the line, and particularly its bridges, have fallen into disrepair. In December 1991 the line was severed when the Roads & Traffic Authority built a deviation of the New England Highway over the line at Bluff Rock south of Tenterfield. At Wallangarra, the line met Queensland Railways' Southern railway line.

== History ==
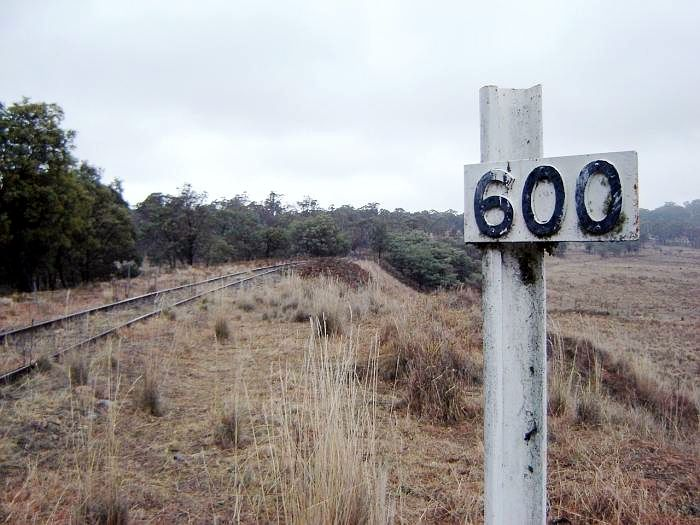
Abandoned section of the Main North line north of Armidale with a post marking the distance from Sydney Central station

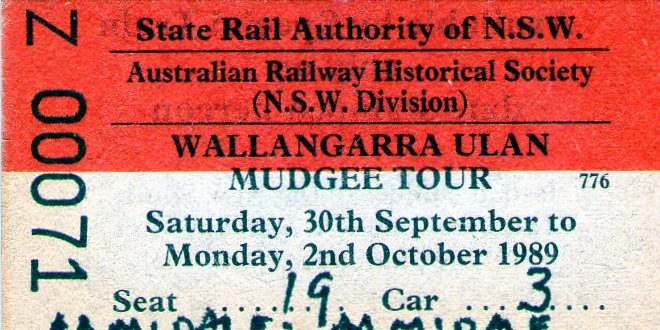
Wallangarra rail ticket 1989

The Great Northern Railway was the original mainline between Sydney and Brisbane. The first section of the Main North line opened in 1857 from the port of Newcastle to East Maitland as the Hunter River Railway Company's line. At a public meeting for the company's establishment in 1853, William Charles Wentworth envisioned the line's extension to Scone up north and Sydney down south. The line was then extended to Victoria Street, Maitland in 1858. It was extended to Singleton in 1863, Muswellbrook in 1869, Scone in 1871 and Murrurundi in 1872.

The GNR was then extended beyond Scone to Werris Creek and West Tamworth in 1878, Armidale in 1883, and reached the Queensland border at Wallangarra in 1888. The North Coast line to Brisbane, via the North Coast was opened in stages between 1905 and 1930, but a ferry carried trains across the Clarence River until the Grafton Bridge was completed in 1932. The Newcastle rail network remained independent of the main network radiating from Sydney until 1889, when the line between Sydney and Newcastle was completed with the opening of the Hawkesbury River Railway Bridge. Thus Newcastle was connected by rail with Wallangarra before it was connected with Sydney, such was the difficulty and expense of reaching and bridging the Hawkesbury River.

The Sydney to Newcastle section, Homebush to Waratah, had difficult topography to overcome, including crossing the Hawkesbury River, traversing the Mullet Creek bank and constructing the Woy Woy Tunnel. From the south, the line was opened between Homebush and Hornsby in 1886, then extended to Hawkesbury River in 1887. From the north, the line opened between Waratah and Gosford in 1887. Progress in the construction of the last section between Hawkesbury River and Gosford occurred when the Woy Woy Tunnel opened in 1887, then Mullet Creek to Gosford in 1888 and finally Hawkesbury River to Mullet Creek in 1889 when the original Hawkesbury River Railway Bridge was built.

In 1892, the line was duplicated from Strathfield to Hornsby, and electrified in 1926 as part of the Bradfield electrification scheme. The line was further electrified to Gosford in January 1960, Wyong in April 1982 and Newcastle in June 1984. Freight trains were hauled by electric locomotives until March 1998.

== Branch lines ==
Several lines branch from the Main North Line, including:

- Newcastle Branch Line from Broadmeadow to Newcastle Interchange (used to go further to old Newcastle station until it was closed in December 2014)
- Richmond Vale railway line from Hexham to Weston (closed 1987)
- South Maitland Railway from Maitland to Pelton
- Merriwa line to Sandy Hollow and on to the Sandy Hollow to Gulgong line
- Mungindi line from Werris Creek to Narrabri and Moree
- Toronto line from Fassifern to Toronto (closed 1990 and converted to cycleway)
- Belmont line from Adamstown to Belmont (closed 1991 and converted to a cycleway called The Fernleigh Track)
- Morpeth Line from East Maitland to Morpeth (closed 1953)
- Barraba line from West Tamworth to Barraba (closed 1980s)

== Services ==
The line was serviced by the overnight Northern Mail until it ceased in November 1988. The Northern Tablelands Express provided a daylight service to Glen Innes, with some journeys extended to Tenterfield until being truncated in October 1985 to Armidale and in February 1990 to Tamworth.

NSW TrainLink operates regional and intercity passenger services along the Main North line. A daily North Western train operates from Sydney to Werris Creek before dividing, one operating along the Main North line to Armidale, the other section operating along the North-West line to Moree. Central Coast & Newcastle Line intercity passenger services operate between Sydney and Newcastle. The Hunter Line operates between Newcastle, Maitland and Scone, with a branch to Dungog on the North Coast line. Sydney Trains operates suburban passenger services in the section between Strathfield and Berowra.

The section between Strathfield and Maitland forms part of the interstate line between Sydney and Brisbane and sees intermodal freight traffic carried between the two cities. The section of line in the Hunter Valley sees intensive coal train working, with the section between Broadmeadow and Maitland one of the busiest freight lines in Australia.

== Developments ==
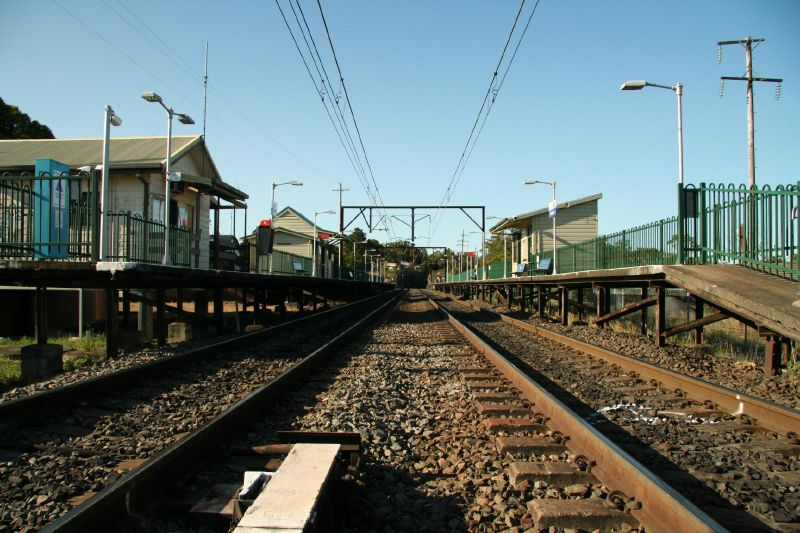
Cowan station

The line was hampered by the rugged terrain and a change of gauge at Wallangarra for traffic to Queensland. The line was superseded as the principal route to Brisbane by the completion of the North Coast Line in 1930. Despite being bypassed, the line remained busy for many years afterwards, with the line instead becoming the major freight link to the wheat and wool regions of northern and north-west New South Wales.

In 1988, the newly elected state government of Nick Greiner commissioned a report into the State Rail Authority by Booz Allen Hamilton. As a result, the line between Tenterfield and Wallangarra was closed. The last train to operate north of Tenterfield was an Australian Railway Historical Society charter on 15 January 1988 hauled by diesel locomotive 4487. The last train to operate north of Glen Innes was hauled by steam locomotive 3001 on 22 October 1989 after which the line was formally suspended from operations.

Following the Northern Tablelands Express being truncated in February 1990, the line north of Tamworth saw little use until the Xplorer service was introduced to Armidale in October 1993. The line to Glen Innes was still open in July 1992 when diesel locomotive 4499 operated a crew training service.

There have been attempts to revive freight or tourist traffic to as far as Glen Innes, although these plans have not yet succeeded.

A section of the line between Waratah and Maitland is quadruple track, with one pair being used exclusively for coal trains within the Hunter Valley coal trains and the other pair being used by passenger trains and general freight. The coal tracks from Port Waratah join the line on the eastern side of the other tracks at Scholey Street Junction and pass underneath the other tracks at Hanbury Dive just west of Maud Street, continuing to Maitland on the western side of the other tracks.

In November 1989, a fourth track was added between Eastwood and West Ryde. In the mid-1990s a loop was constructed at Cowan.

The Sandgate Flyover was constructed in 2006 to allow the two tracks to rise and pass over the coal tracks that branch off to Kooragang Island in order to eliminate a capacity restriction caused by the long coal trains crossing the other tracks at grade. Because of the location of the overpass relative to the branch to Kooragang Island, a short section of the line has six parallel tracks. The bridge carrying Sandgate Road over the lines had to modified to allow for the additional lines. Sandgate station is flanked by a pair of coal tracks on each side.

As part of the Rail Clearways Program, in August 2006 an additional platform was opened at Berowra, and in March 2009 an additional platform and passing loop was opened at Hornsby.

In 2011, the Northern Sydney Freight Corridor project commenced to improve access for freight trains. This has seen the completion of a loop at Hexham in June 2012, two loops between Gosford and Narara in February 2015, plus an underpass and loop between North Strathfield and Rhodes in June 2015. A third track between Epping and Thornleigh was completed in June 2016.

== Engineering heritage award ==
The Great Northern Railway received a Historic Engineering Marker from Engineers Australia as part of its Engineering Heritage Recognition Program.

== See also ==
- Central Coast & Newcastle Line, passenger service using this railway line
- Rail transport in New South Wales
- Sydney–Brisbane rail corridor
- Woy Woy Tunnel
