= Blackalls Park railway station =

Former railway station in New South Wales, Australia

Coordinates: 33.0013°S 151.5856°E

Blackalls Park
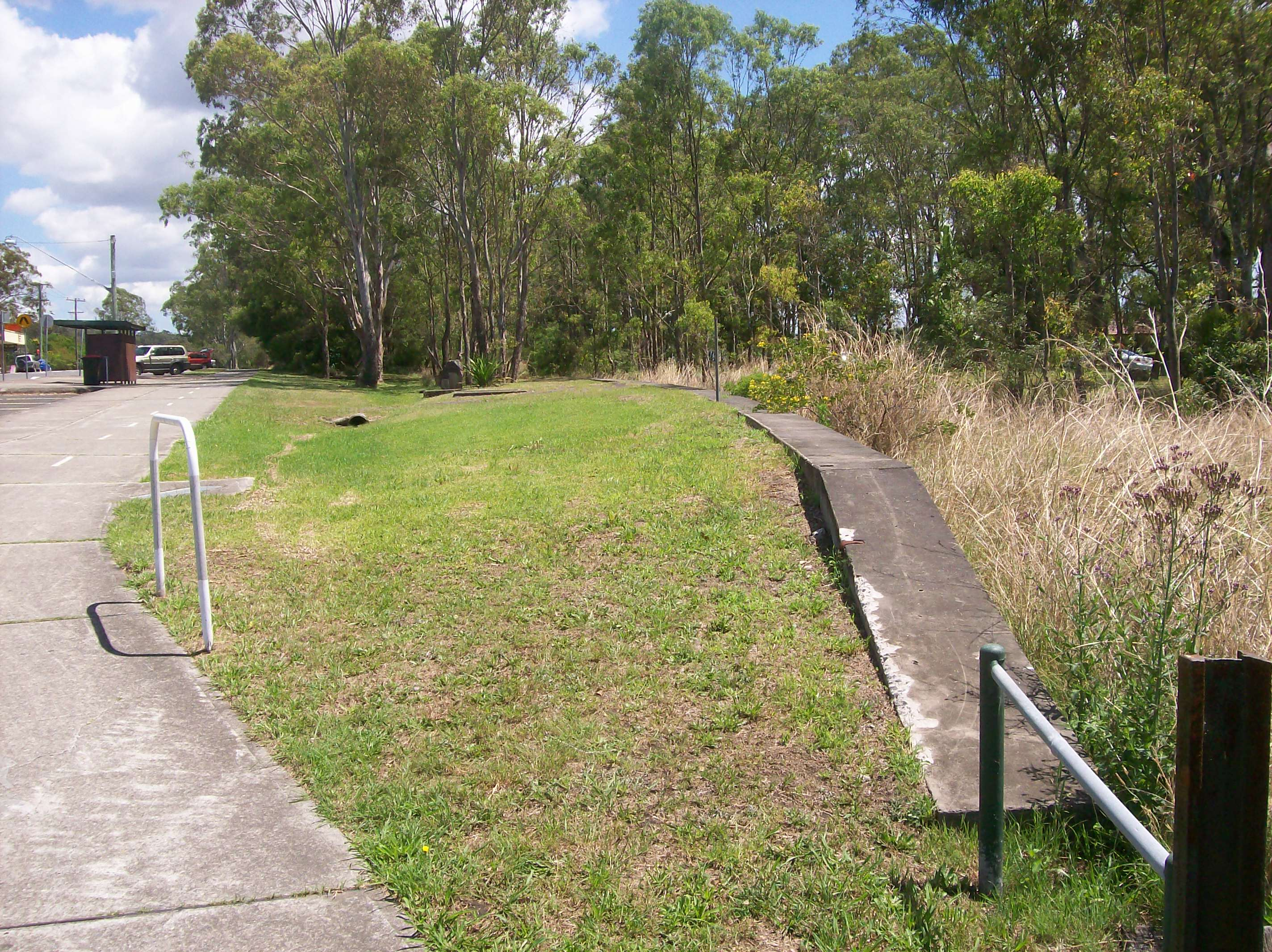

General information
- Line: Toronto Line
- Platforms: 1
- Tracks: 1

Other information
- Status: Closed

History
- Opened: 7 March 1891
- Closed: 1990

Former services
Preceding station	Former services	Following station
Fassifern Terminus	Toronto Line	Toronto Terminus
Location

Blackalls Park was a railway station in the suburb of Blackalls Park, on the former Fassifern–Toronto branch line in New South Wales, Australia.

The station was closed in 1990. As of 2024, the track and its one platform at the station is still largely intact, albeit overgrown. Since its closure, the station and its branch line have been converted into a rail trail.

== Image gallery ==
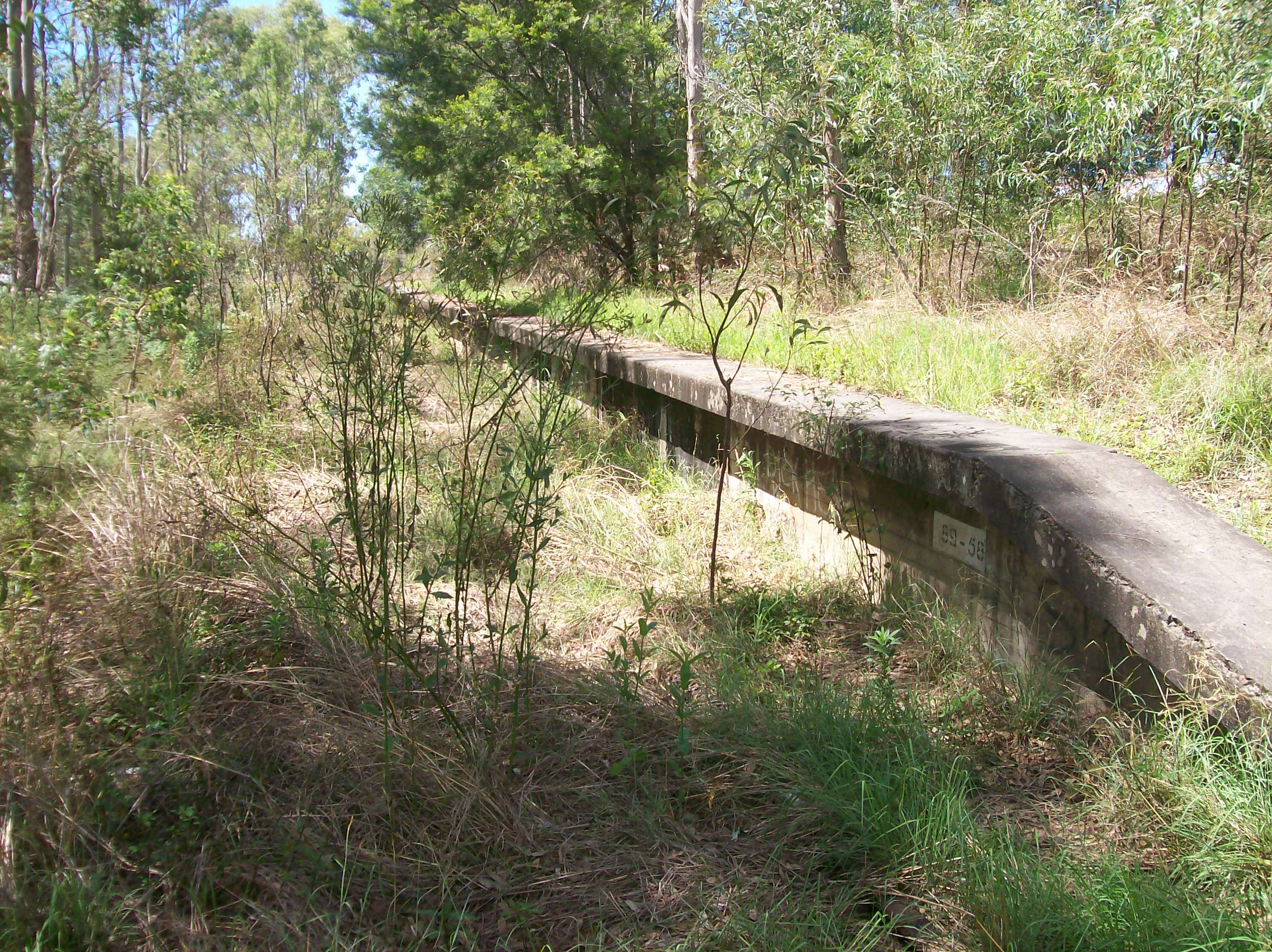
End of platform, looking toward Toronto direction

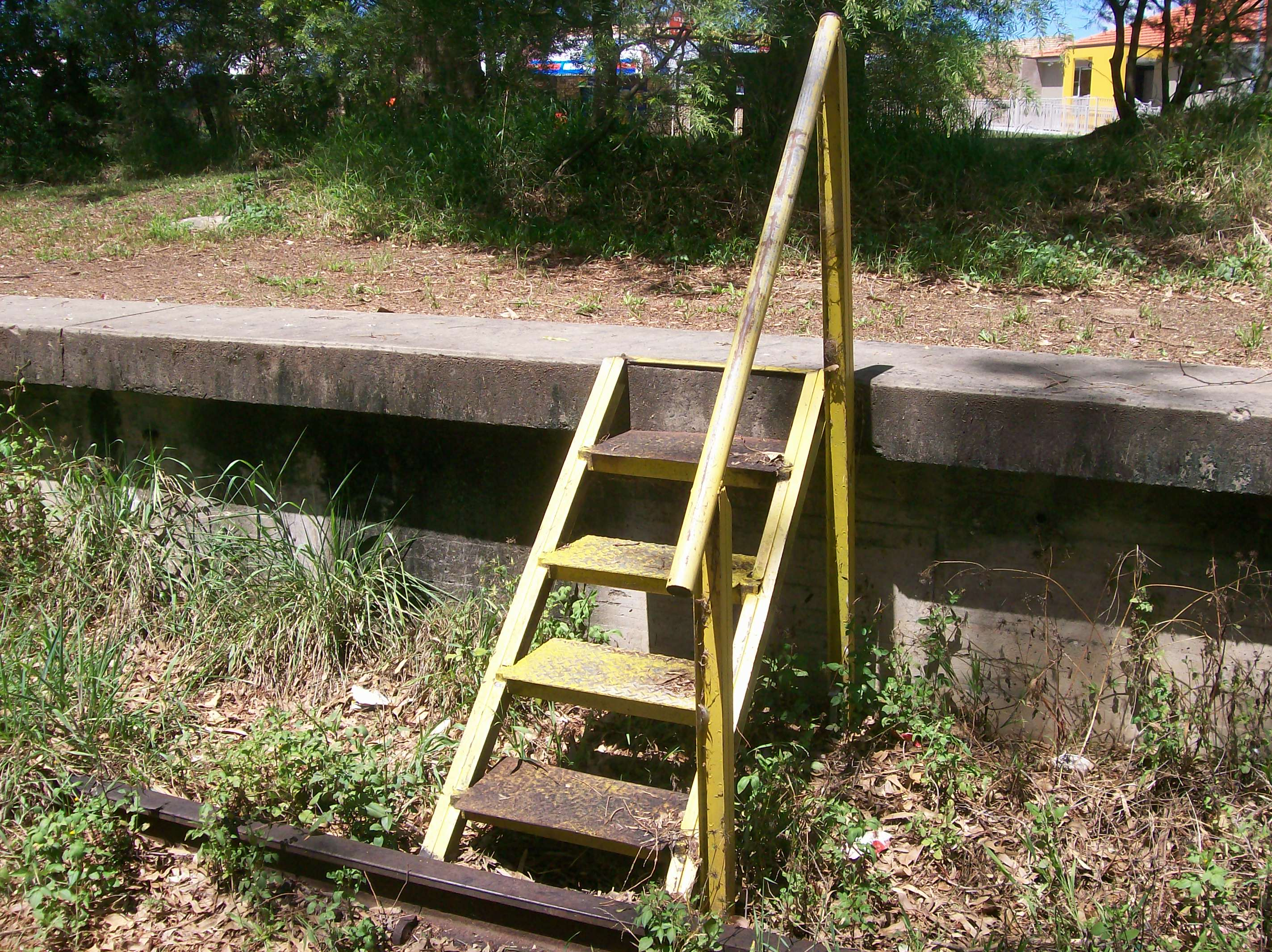
Steps from platform to track

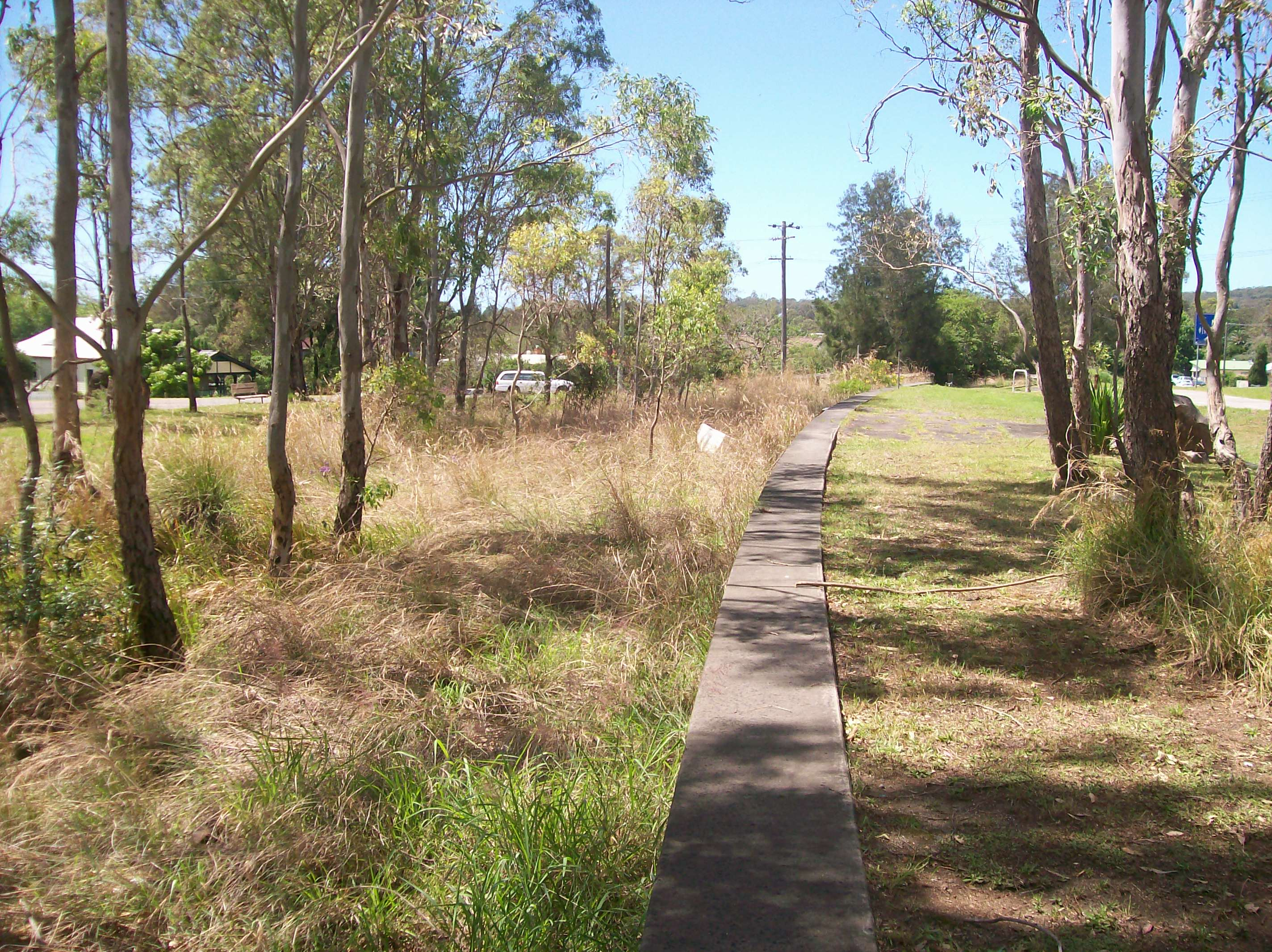
Looking down the platform, toward Toronto

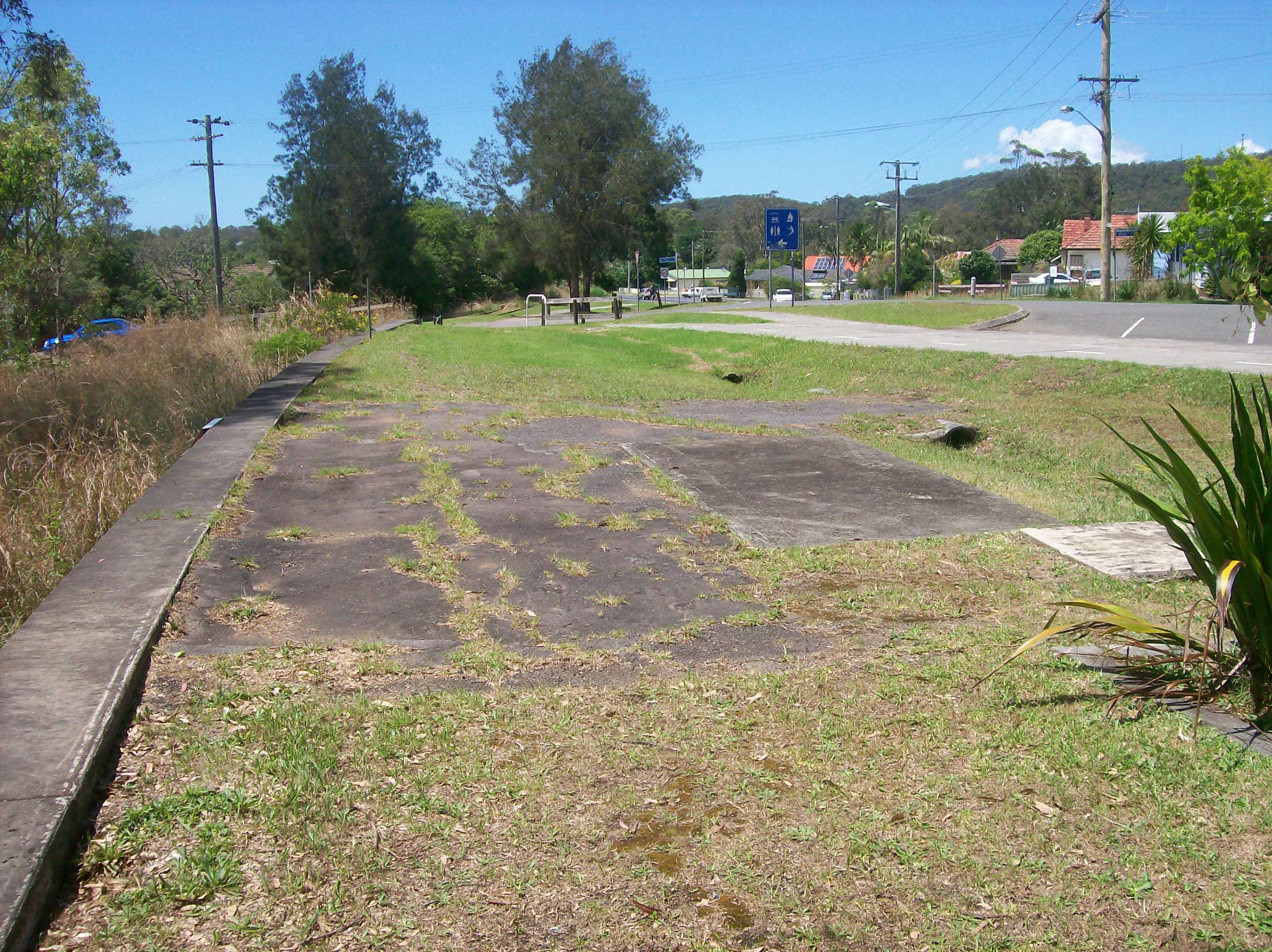
Location of the former toilet block

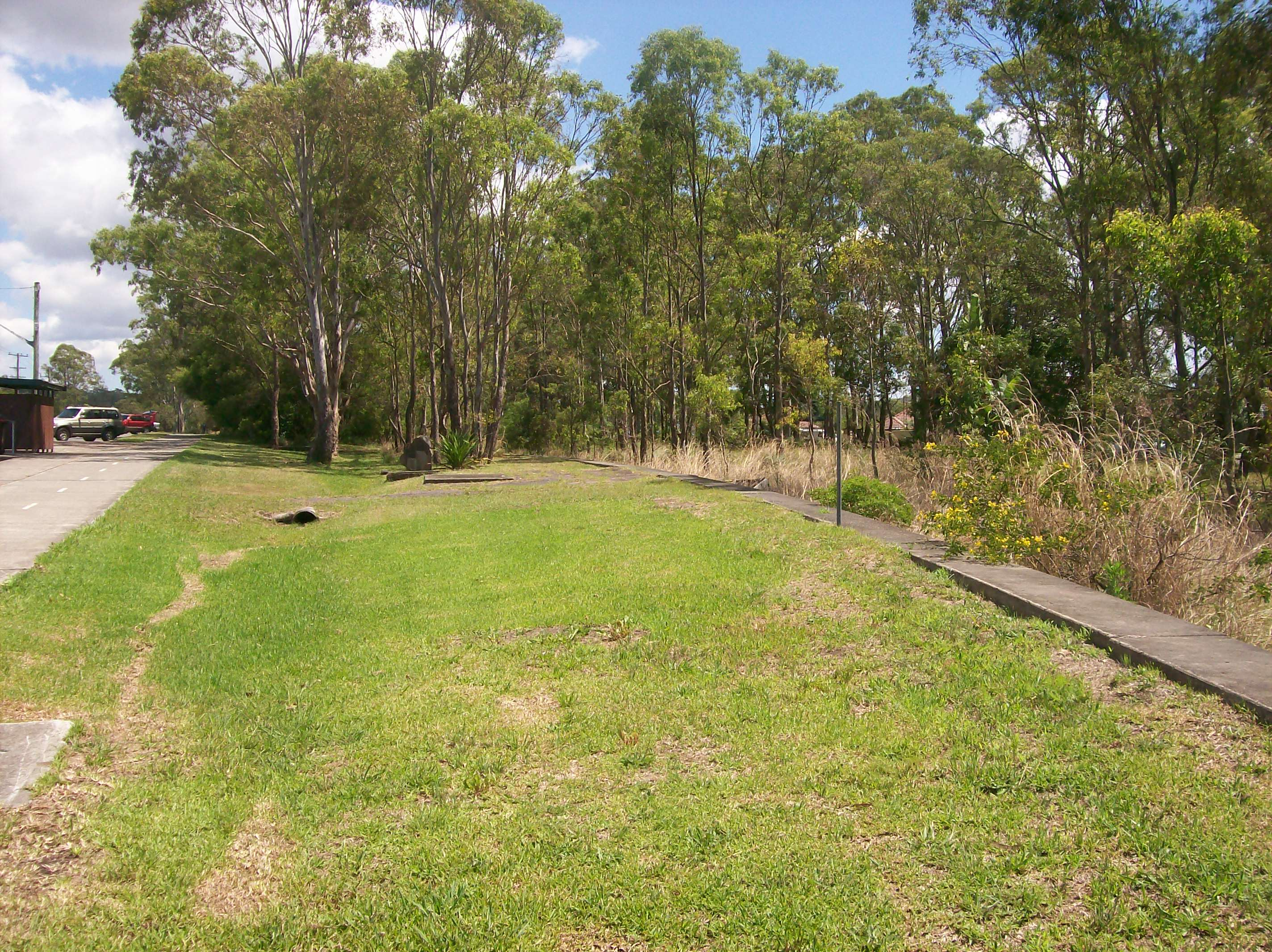
Platform area

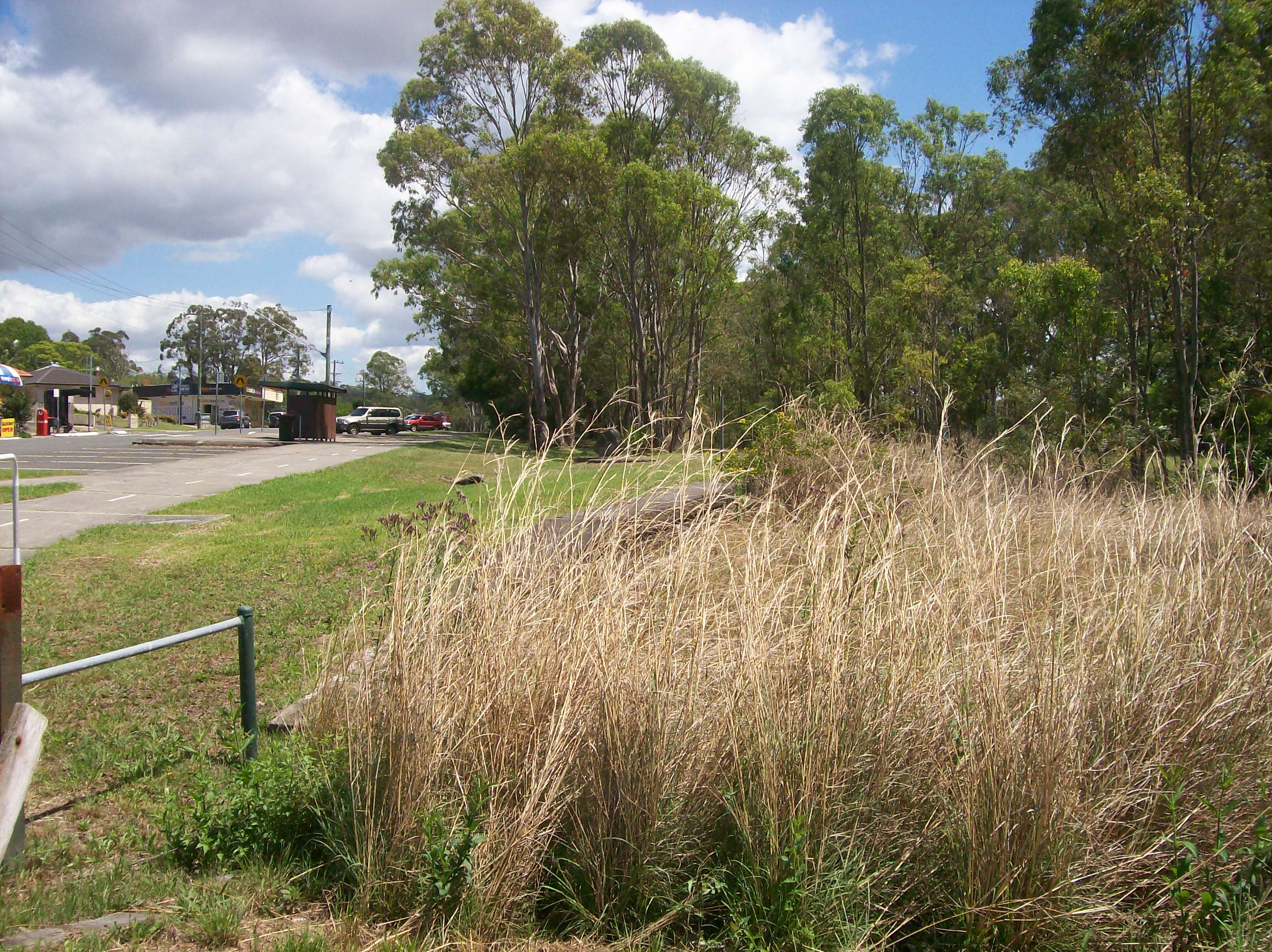
Overgrown area on tracks

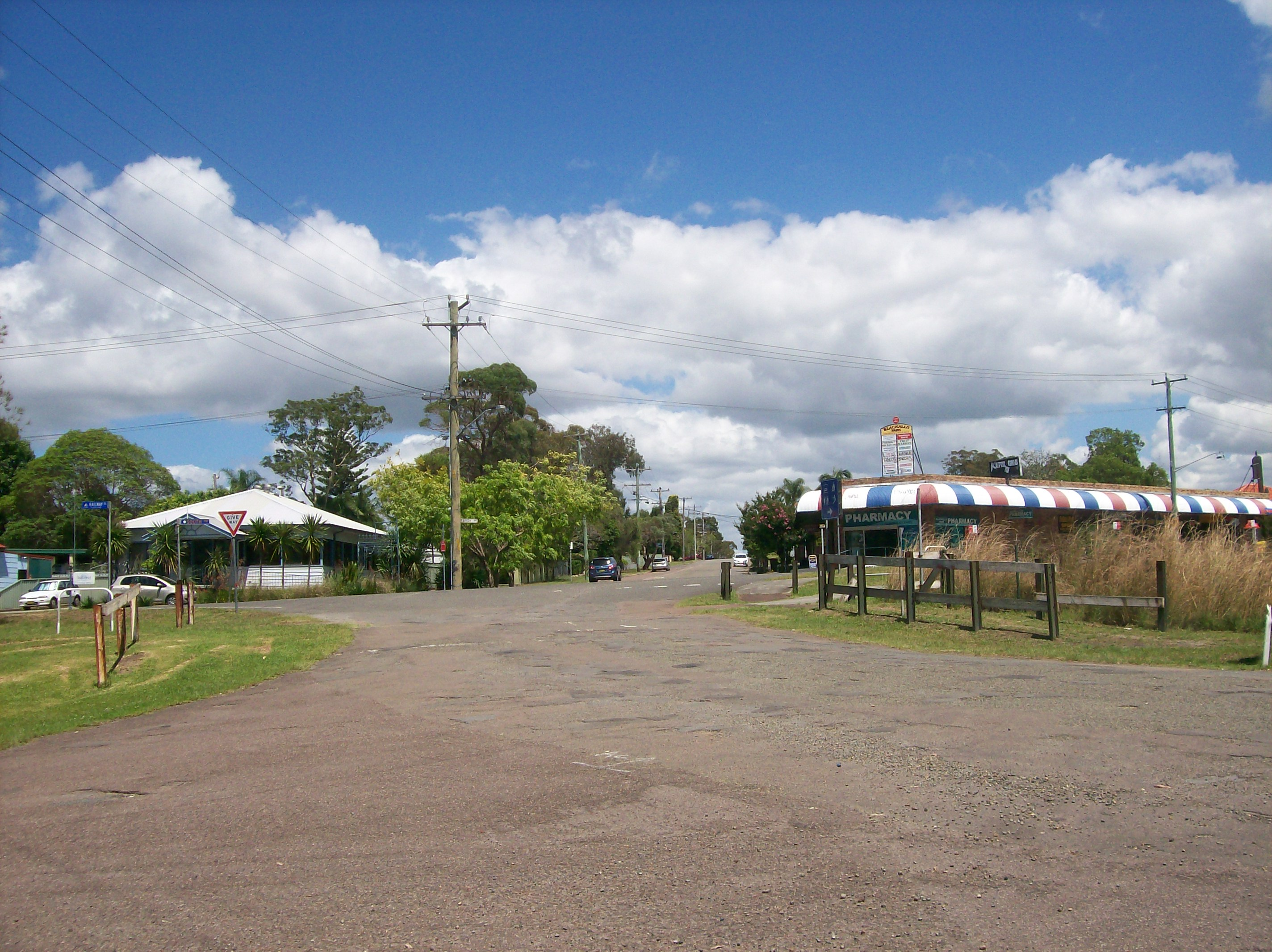
Location of the former railway crossing, next to station

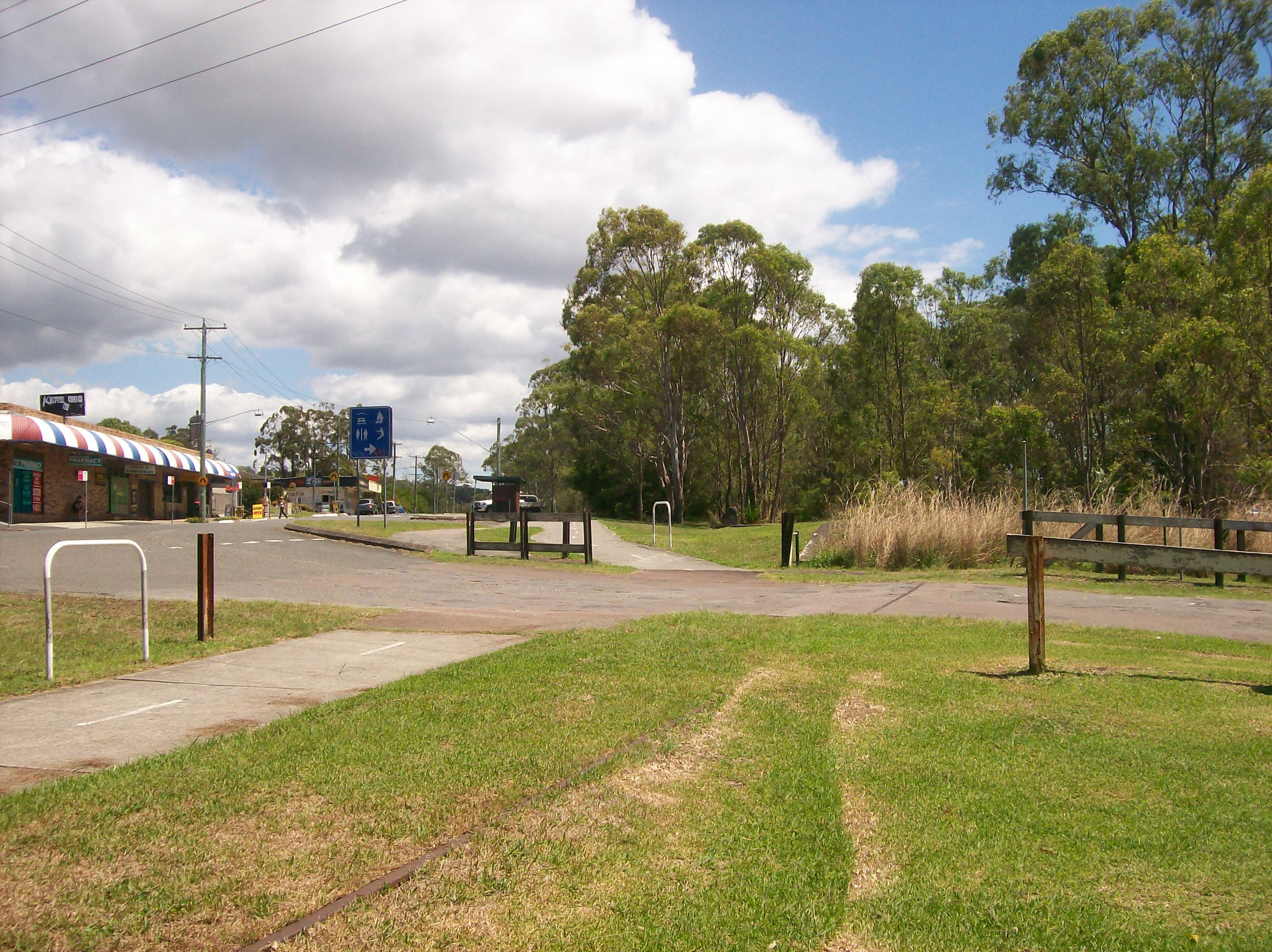
Looking toward former railway crossing and station
