= Fassifern railway station =

Railway station in New South Wales, Australia

Fassifern
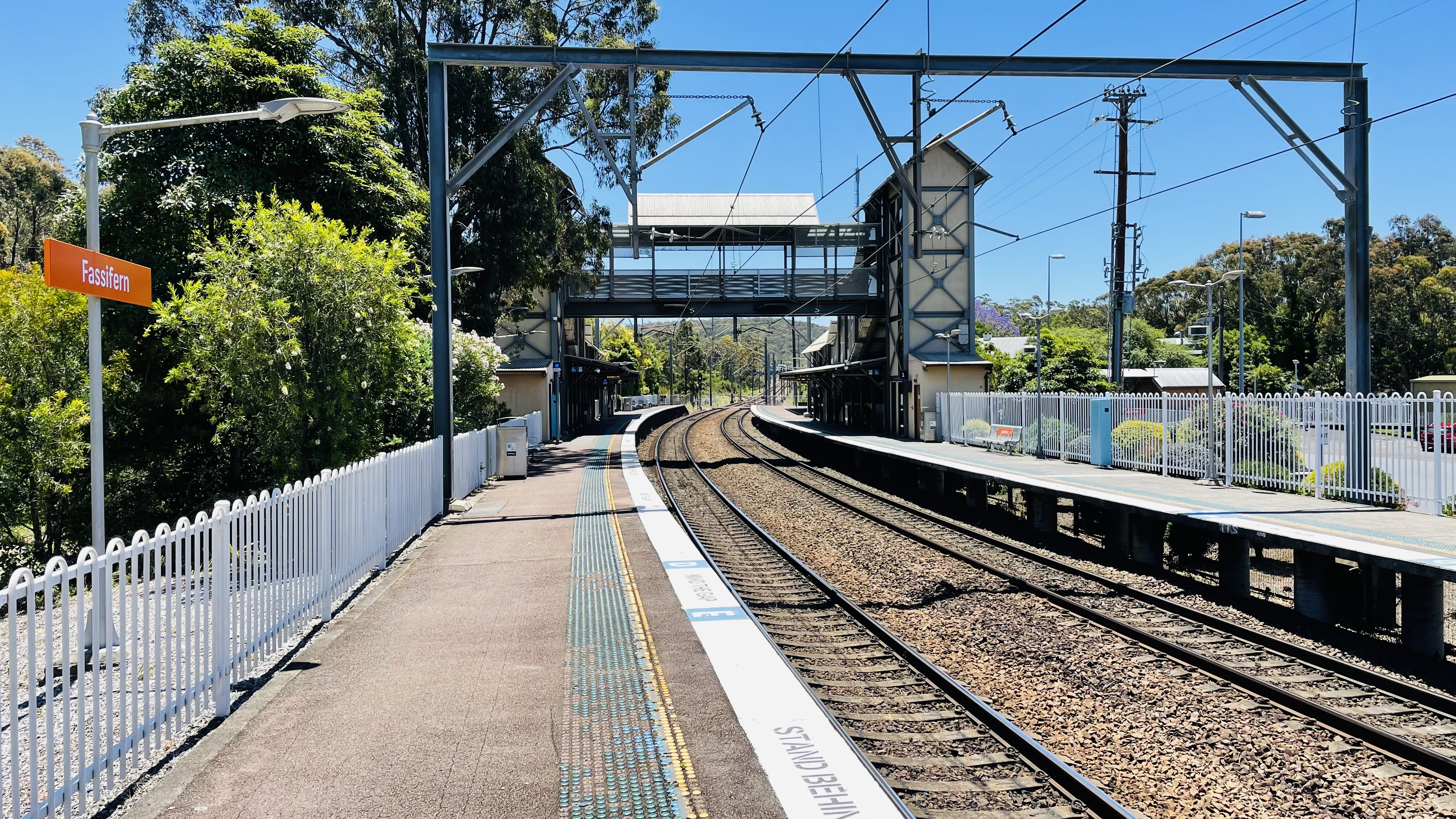
- Northbound view from Platform 2, November 2022

General information
- Location: Fassifern Road, Fassifern; Australia
- Coordinates: 32°59′07″S 151°34′52″E
- Owner: Transport Asset Manager of New South Wales
- Operator: Sydney Trains
- Line: Main Northern
- Distance: 142.31 km (88.43 mi) from Central
- Platforms: 2 side, 1 isolated side
- Tracks: 2
- Connections: Bus

Construction
- Structure type: Ground
- Accessible: Yes

Other information
- Status: Weekdays: Staffed: 4.30am to 9.30pm: Weekends and public holidays: Staffed: 5.30am to 9pm
- Station code: FSN
- Website: Transport for NSW

History
- Opened: 1888; 138 years ago

Passengers
- 2025: 221,789 (year); 608 (daily) (Sydney Trains, NSW TrainLink)

Services
| Preceding station | Intercity Trains | Following station |
|---|---|---|
| Booragul towards Newcastle Interchange | Central Coast & Newcastle Line | Awaba towards Central |
| Cardiff towards Newcastle Interchange | Central Coast & Newcastle Line Express | Morisset towards Central |
| Preceding station | NSW TrainLink | Following station |
| Broadmeadow towards Grafton, Casino or Brisbane | NSW TrainLink North Coast Line | Wyong towards Sydney |
| Broadmeadow towards Moree or Armidale | NSW TrainLink North Western Line | Wyong towards Sydney |
Former service
| Preceding station | Former services | Following station |
|---|---|---|
| Terminus | Toronto Line | Blackalls Park towards Toronto |
Location
- Location within New South Wales

Fassifern railway station is a heritage-listed railway station located on the Main Northern line in New South Wales, Australia. It serves the City of Lake Macquarie suburb of Fassifern, opening in 1888.

The station has three platforms, although only two are in use, the third being the former branch-line platform for the Toronto line that closed in 1990. North of the line is a balloon loop for the Newstan Colliery that is served by Southern Shorthaul Railroad hauled trains.

In 1984, a footbridge was installed as part of the electrification of the line. It was replaced in 1994 when lifts were added.

== Platforms and services ==
Fassifern has two operational side platforms and one closed side platform. It is serviced by Sydney Trains Central Coast & Newcastle Line services travelling between Sydney Central, Gosford and Newcastle.

It is also serviced by NSW TrainLink Xplorer and XPT long-distance services between Sydney, Armidale, Moree, Casino and Brisbane.

| Platform | Line | Stopping pattern | Notes |
| 0 | Not in use | Former services to Toronto Station | Closed |
| 1 | CCN | Services to Gosford & Sydney Central | |
| 1 | North Coast Region | Services to Sydney Central | Set down only |
| 1 | North Western Region | Services to Sydney Central | Set down only |
| 2 | CCN | Services to Newcastle | |
| 2 | North Coast Region | Services to Casino & Brisbane | Pick up only |
| 2 | North Western Region | Services to Armidale/Moree | Pick up only |

== Transport links ==
Hunter Valley Buses operates three bus routes via Fassifern station, under contract to Transport for NSW:

- 270: Newcastle University to Toronto West
- 271: Stockland Glendale to Toronto
- 273: to Toronto via Blackalls Park
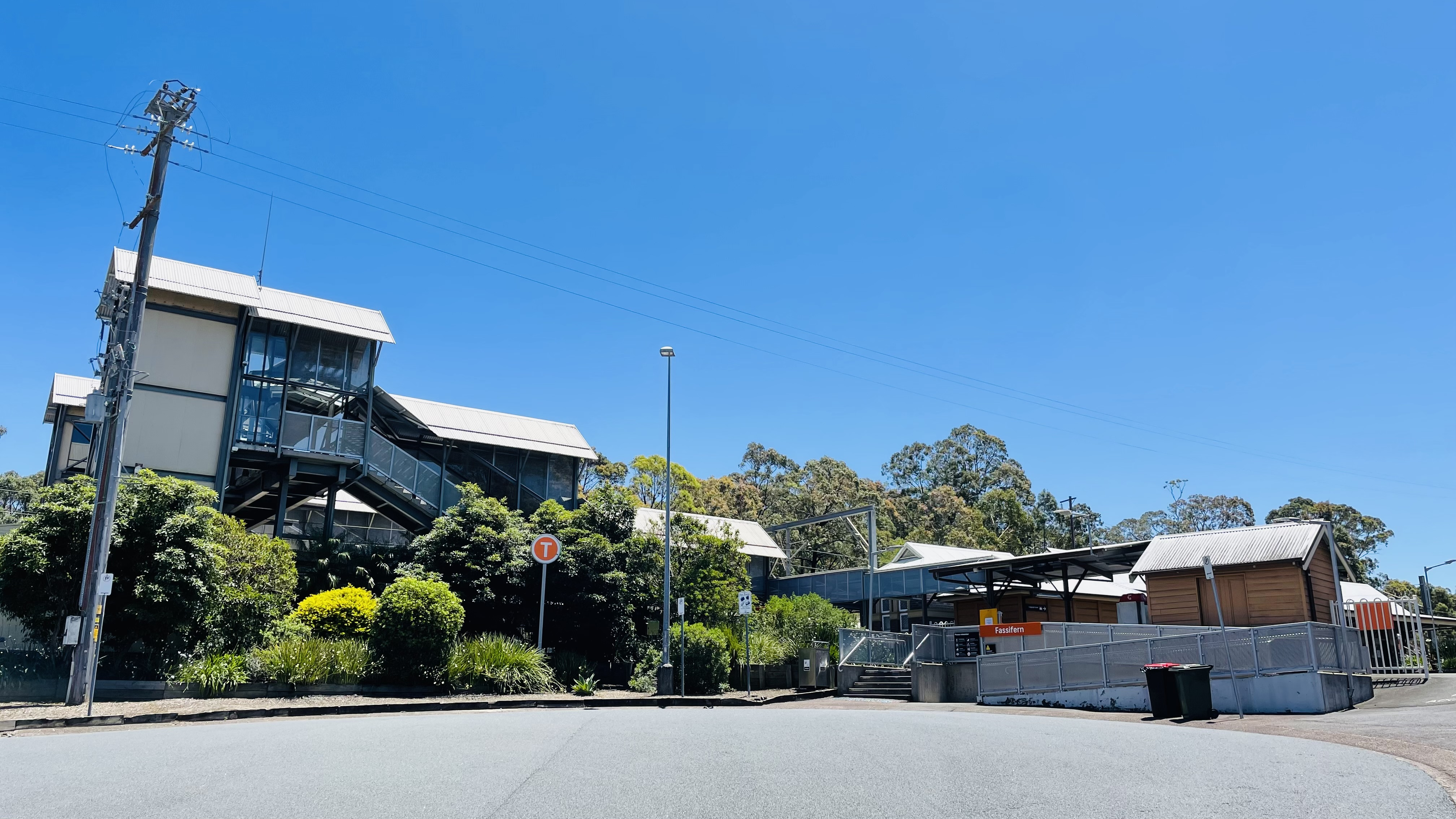
Entrance

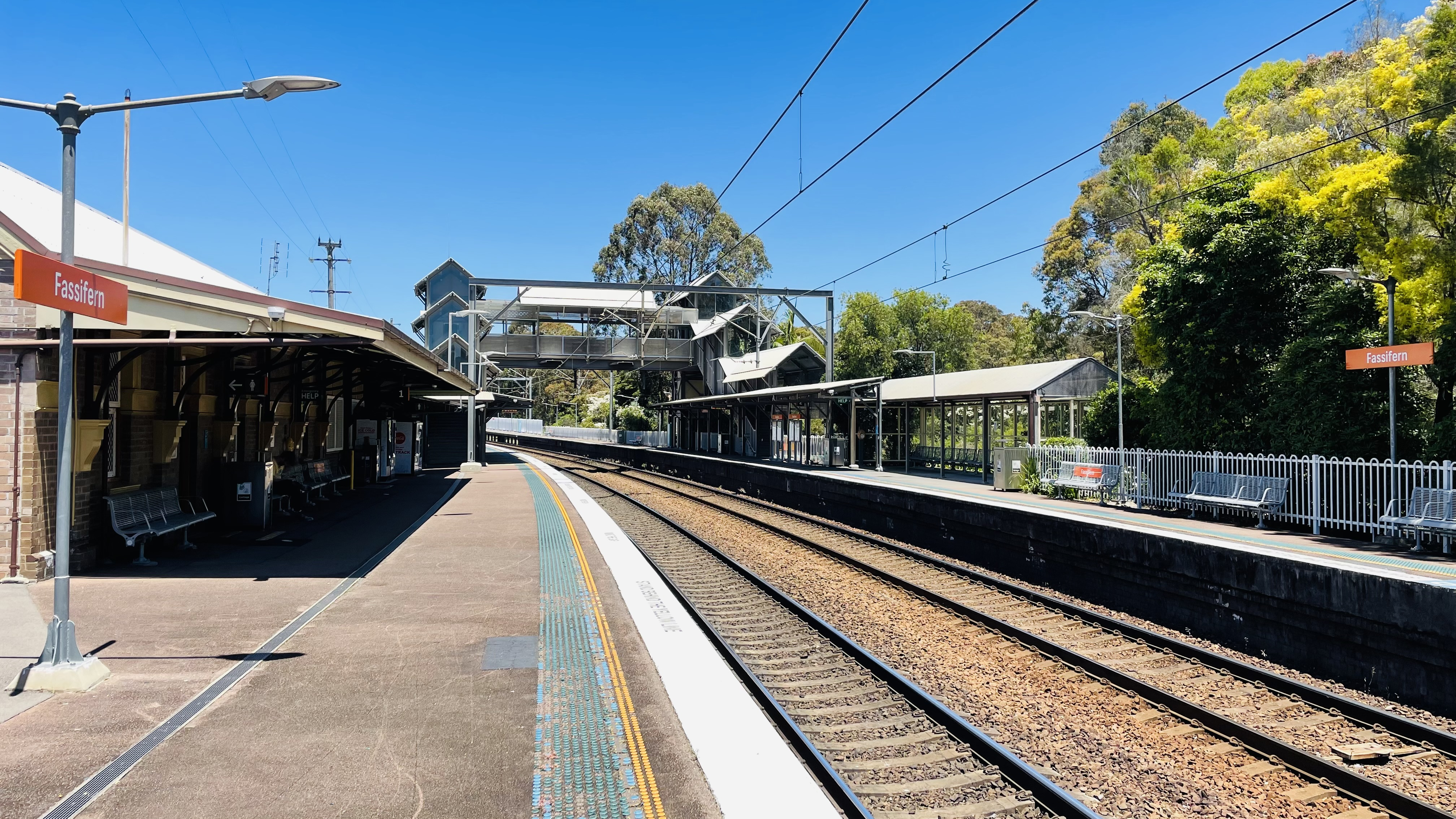
Southbound view from Platform 1

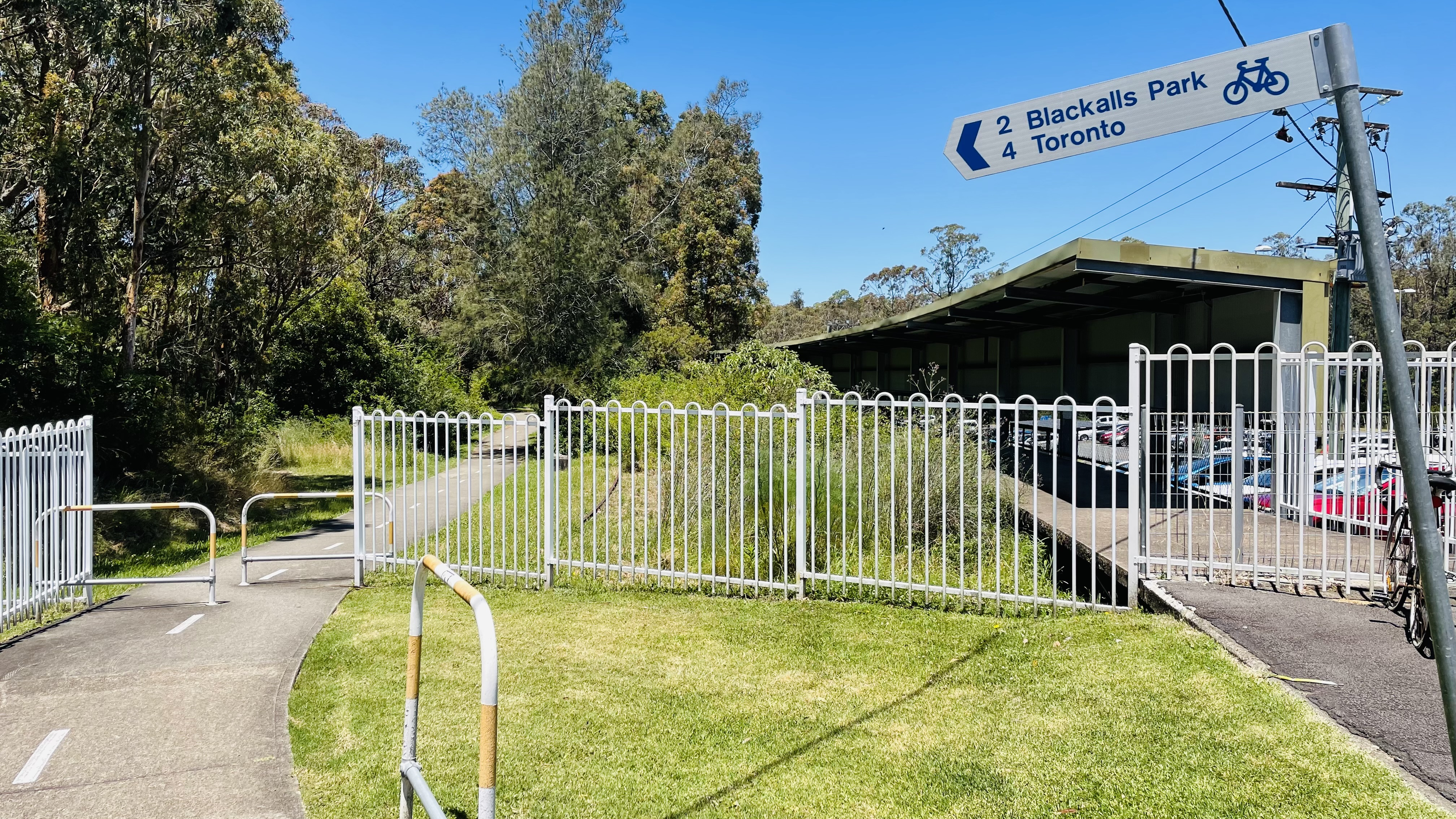
Former Toronto Branch line and walking track

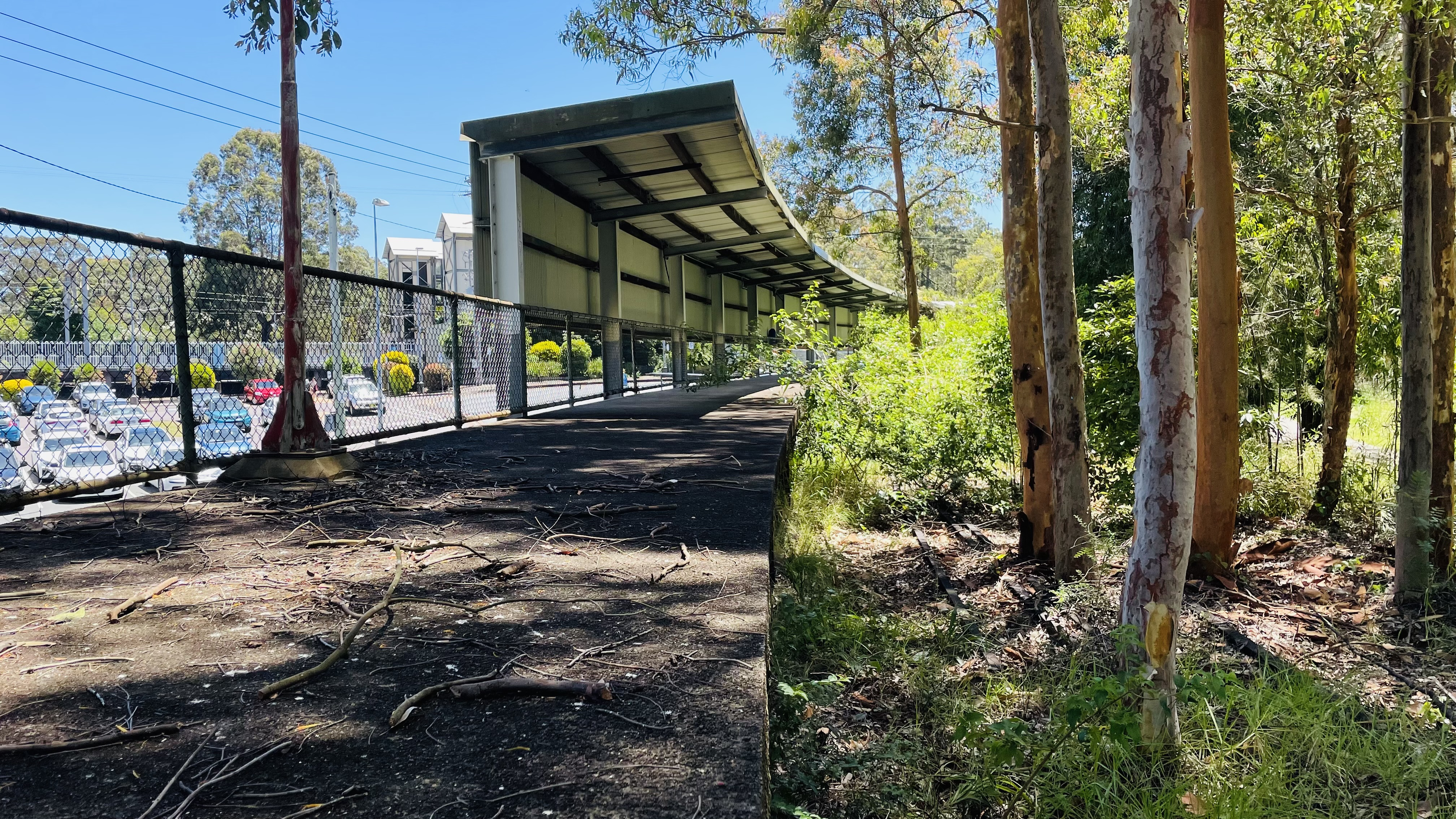
Former Platform
