= Toronto railway line =

Former railway line in New South Wales

Overview
- Termini: Fassifern; Toronto

History
- Opened: 7 March 1891
- Closed: 10 March 1990

The Toronto Branch Railway Line is a heritage-listed closed railway line in New South Wales, Australia. The line opened in 1891, and branched off the Main Northern line at Fassifern station, crossing over a single lane tunnel on Fassifern Road, and following the shore of Fennell Bay to Blackalls Park. The Toronto end of the line is located close to the shore of Toronto Bay.

== History ==
The line was initially built as a private branch off the Main Northern Line at Fassifern by the Excelsior Land, Investment, and Building Company, providing a rail connection to their estate in Toronto on the shore of Lake Macquarie. It was opened on Saturday 7 March 1891 and cost £12,000 to build. The company provided a single 60 seater carriage, with first class, second class and luggage compartments, hauled by an ex-government steam engine.

By 1909, the private operator had let the line and rolling stock fall into disrepair. Their train had frequent breakdowns and eventually mainline trains were banned from operating on the line due to the poor condition of the track. All traffic had ceased by March. After much community agitation, in April 1910, a government takeover and rebuild of the line was authorised. The full line was reopened in early 1911, with some easing of gradients to meet government railway standards. Blackall's station was rebuilt at a new site in May 1911.

Prince Edward visited Toronto by steamer on 25 June 1920 and proceeded to Newcastle over the line on the Royal Train.

The line was not included in the Wyong–Newcastle electrification project, completed in 1984. Services were withdrawn on the line on 10 March 1990.

== Services ==
Initially Excelsior ran their train as a shuttle between Fassifern and Toronto to meet each stopping mainline train, with occasional through trains operating through to Newcastle on Sundays and holidays. During this period of private operation, at least two ex-government steam engines were used (known as Pygmy and Coffee Pot), as well as a horse drawn trolley.

By 1936, through services to Newcastle operated every day, with shuttle trains continuing to meet all other trains at Fassifern. There were approximately 15 services per day in each direction.

By 1989 services were operated by 620/720 class diesel railcars and operated as frequently as every 20 minutes.

The line was closed in 1990 and replaced with a train replacement bus service. It has since become a regular outer suburban and is currently numbered route 273, operated by Hunter Valley Buses.

== Gallery ==
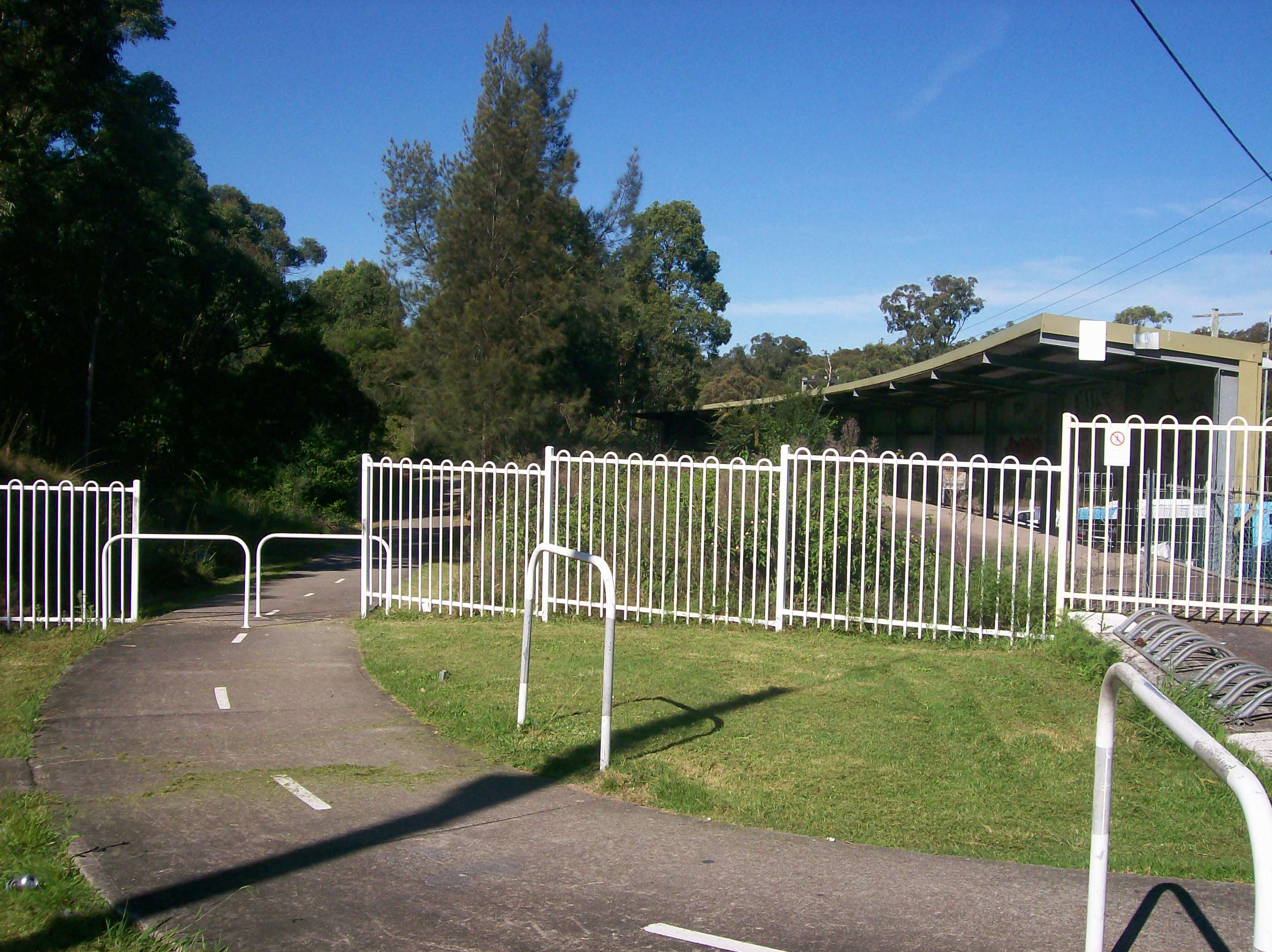
Beginning of the cycleway at Fassifern railway station

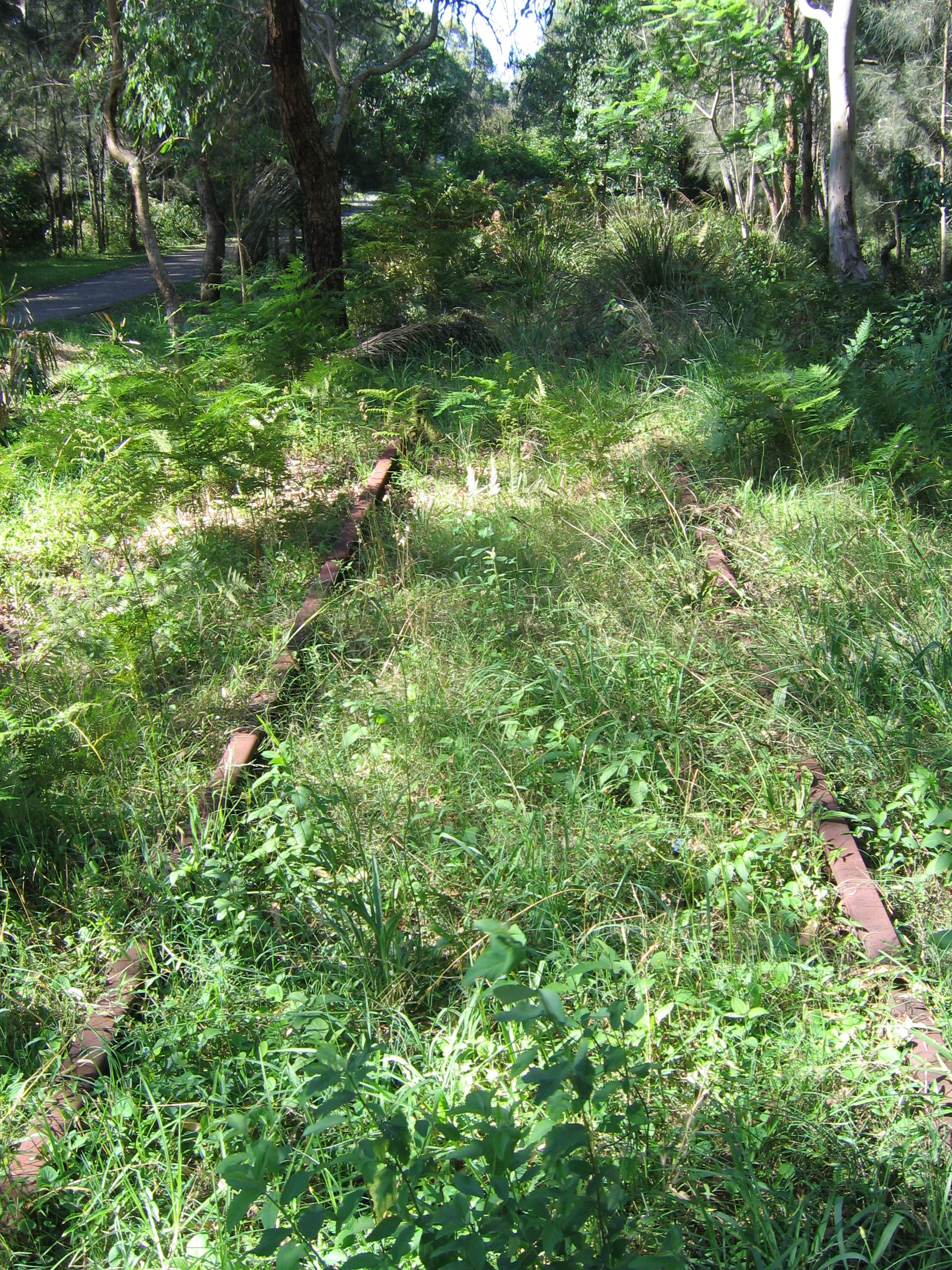
Looking north along line with cycleway in background. Near the end of Narara Street, Fassifern

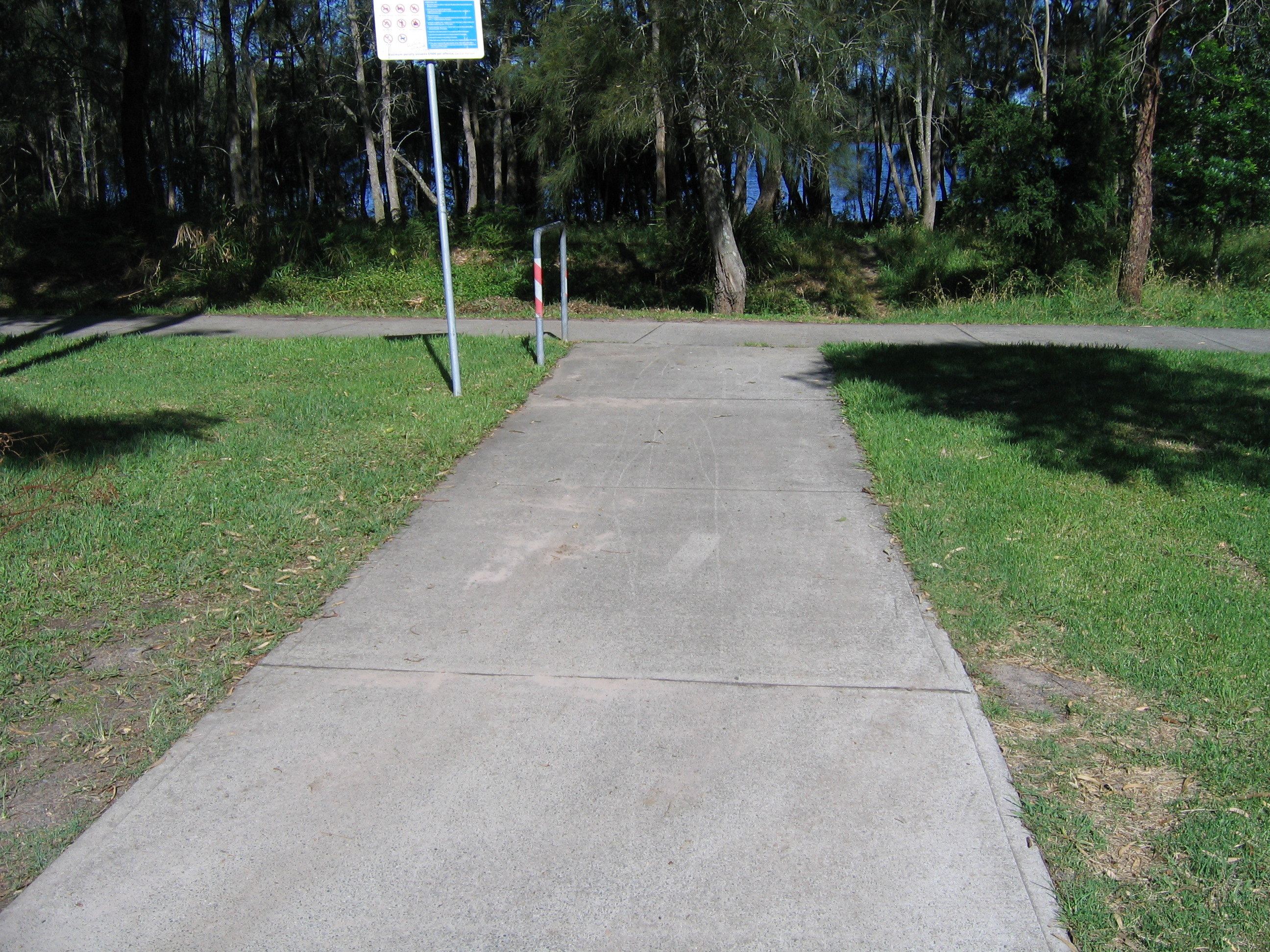
Looking east across the intersection of the cycleway near the end of Narara Street, Fassifern. The overgrown railway line and Fennell Bay are in background

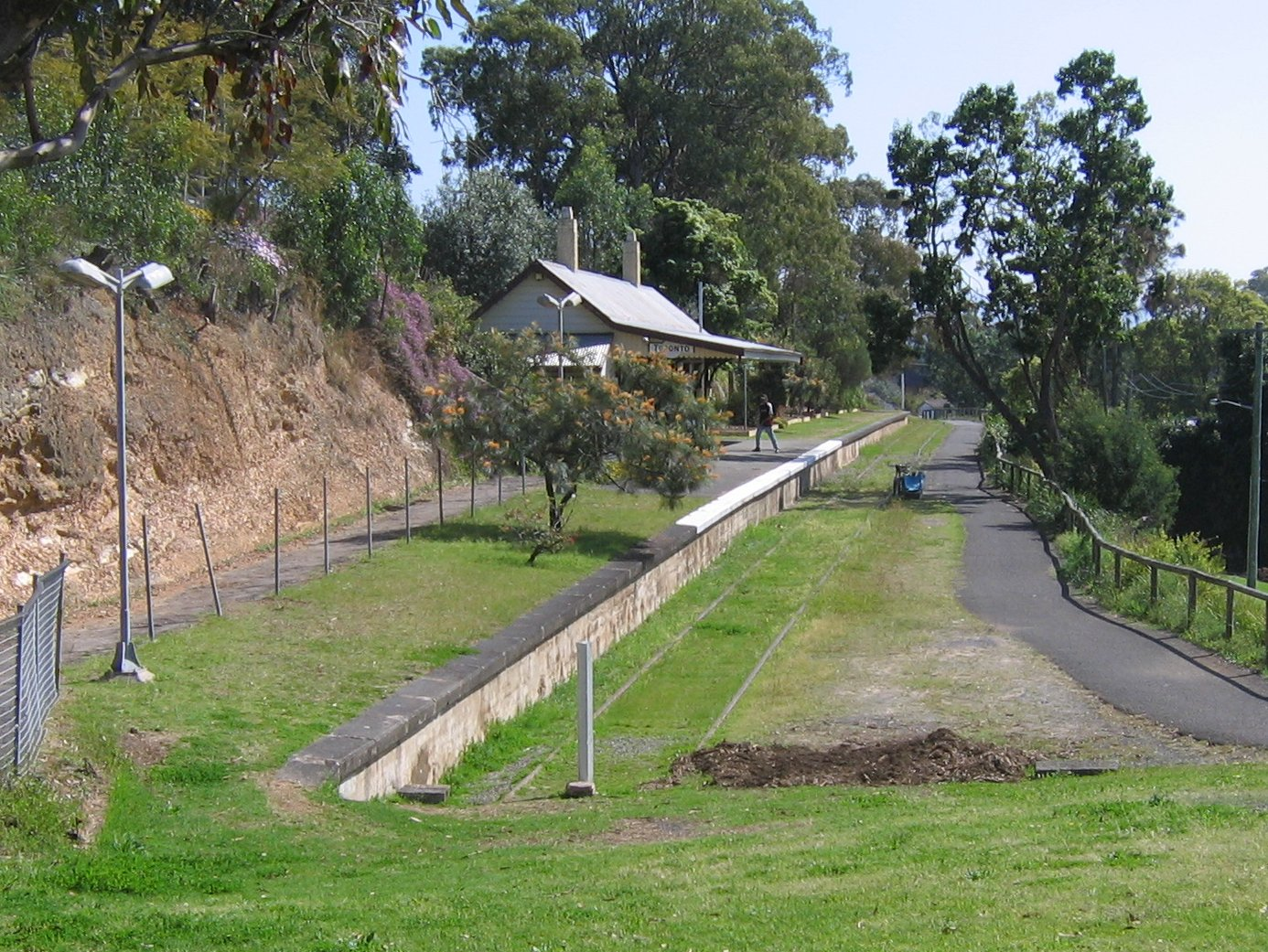
Toronto Station

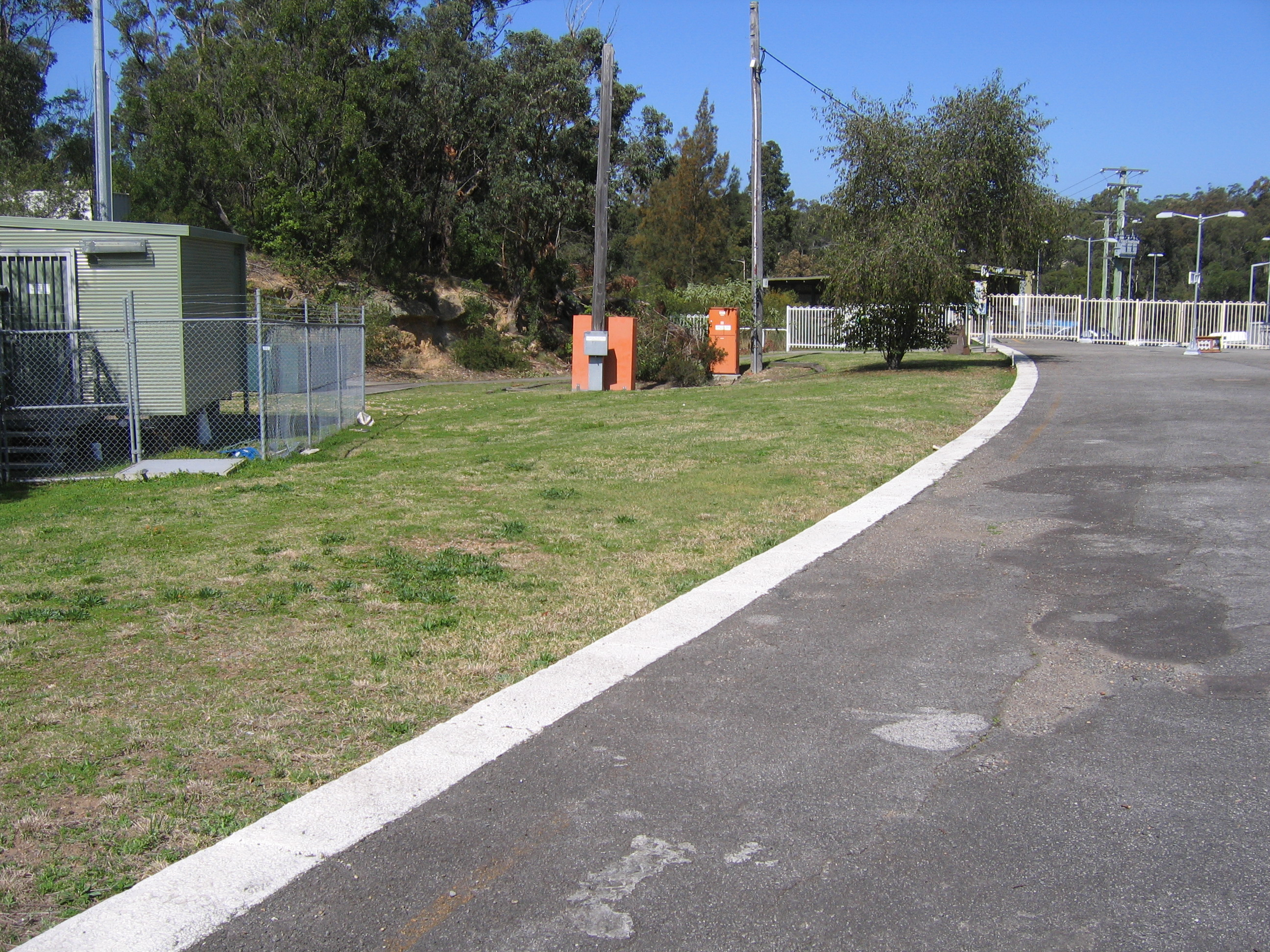
Toronto branch platform at Fassifern railway station
