= Toronto railway station =

Former railway station in New South Wales, Australia

Toronto
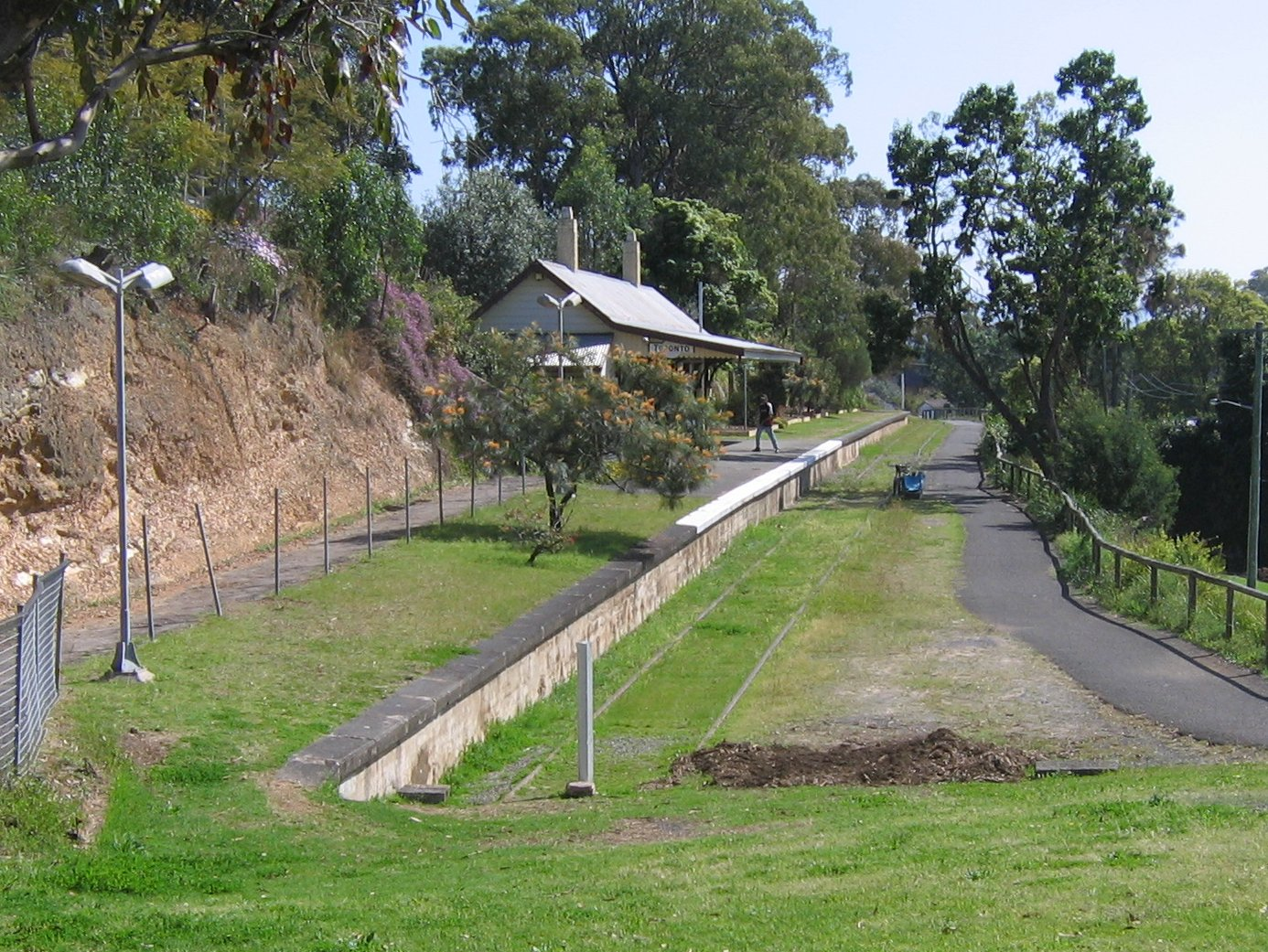

General information
- Location: Australia
- Coordinates: 33°00′43″S 151°35′47″E
- Line: Toronto Line
- Platforms: 1
- Tracks: 1

Other information
- Status: Closed

History
- Opened: 7 March 1891
- Closed: 11 March 1990

Former services
Preceding station	Former services	Following station
Blackalls Park towards Fassifern	Toronto Line	Terminus
Location

Toronto railway station is a former railway station located in the Lake Macquarie suburb of Toronto, the terminus of the former Fassifern - Toronto branch line in New South Wales, Australia.

The station opened in c. 1891 as a private tourist tramway and was subsequently acquired by the NSW Government Railways in 1910. The station closed on 11 March 1990. The line and station is still largely intact. The station building is an example of heritage re-use, now in use by the Lake Macquarie and District Historical Society.

== Gallery ==
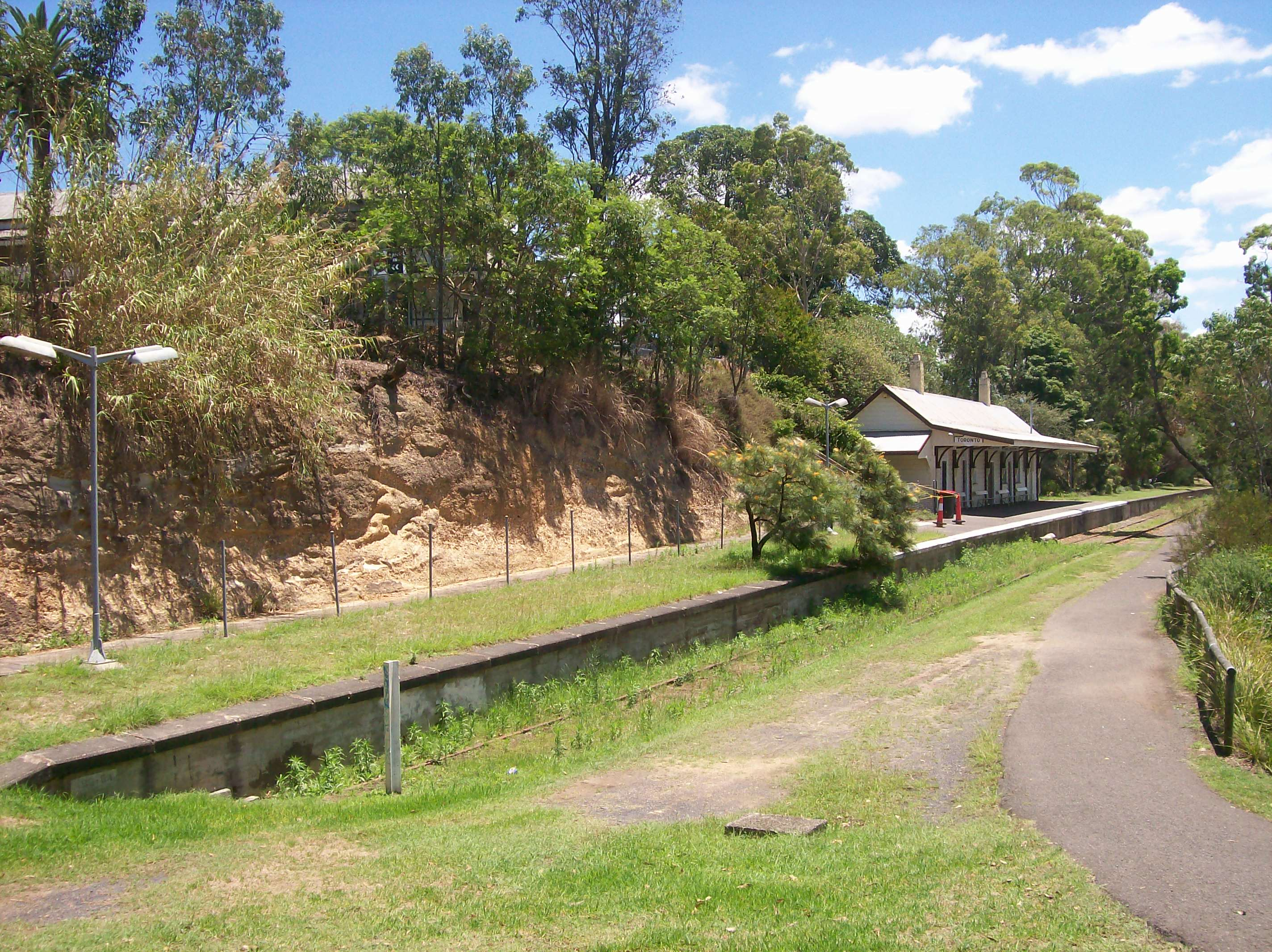
Station seen from exterior

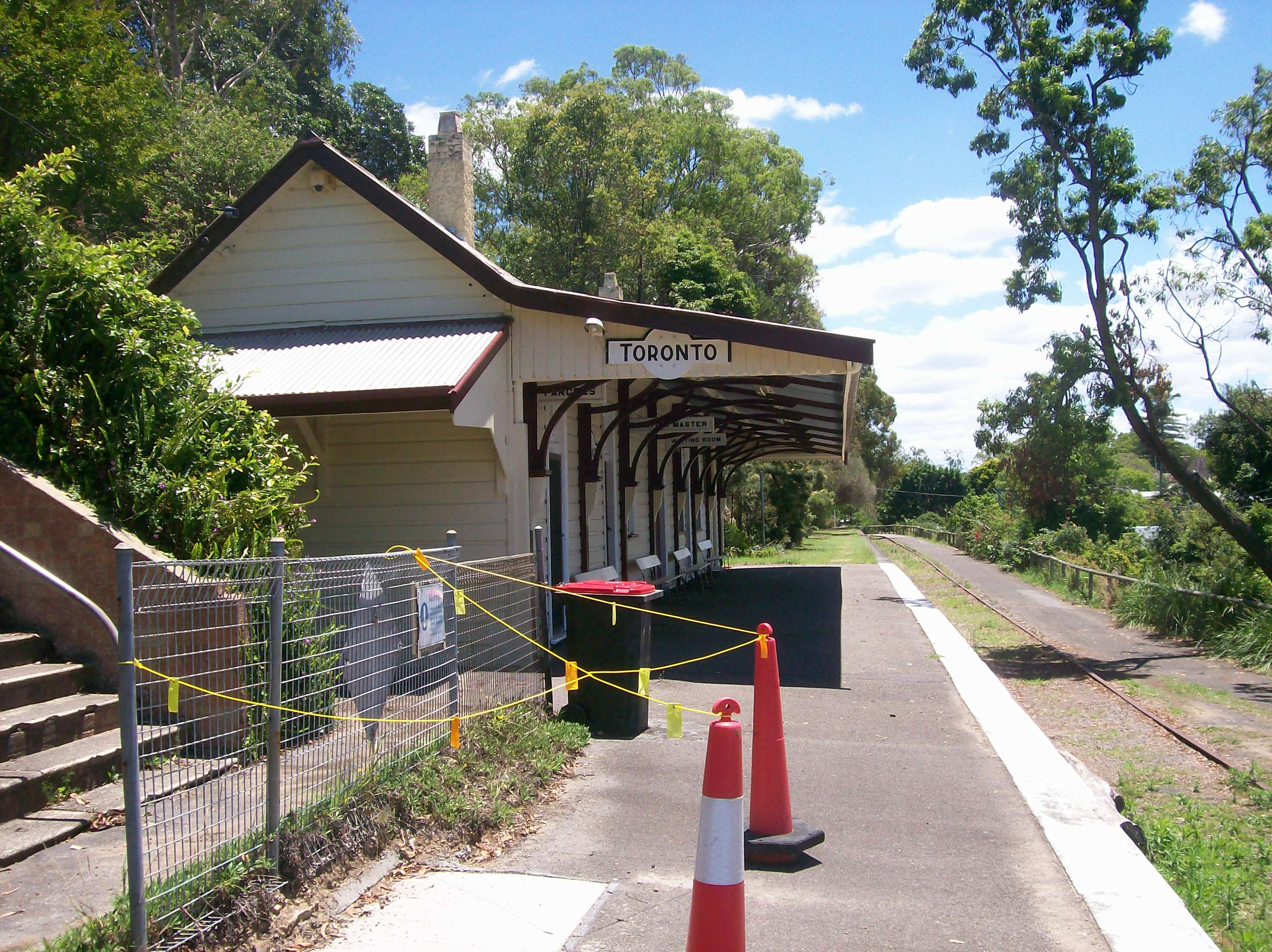
The platform and station building

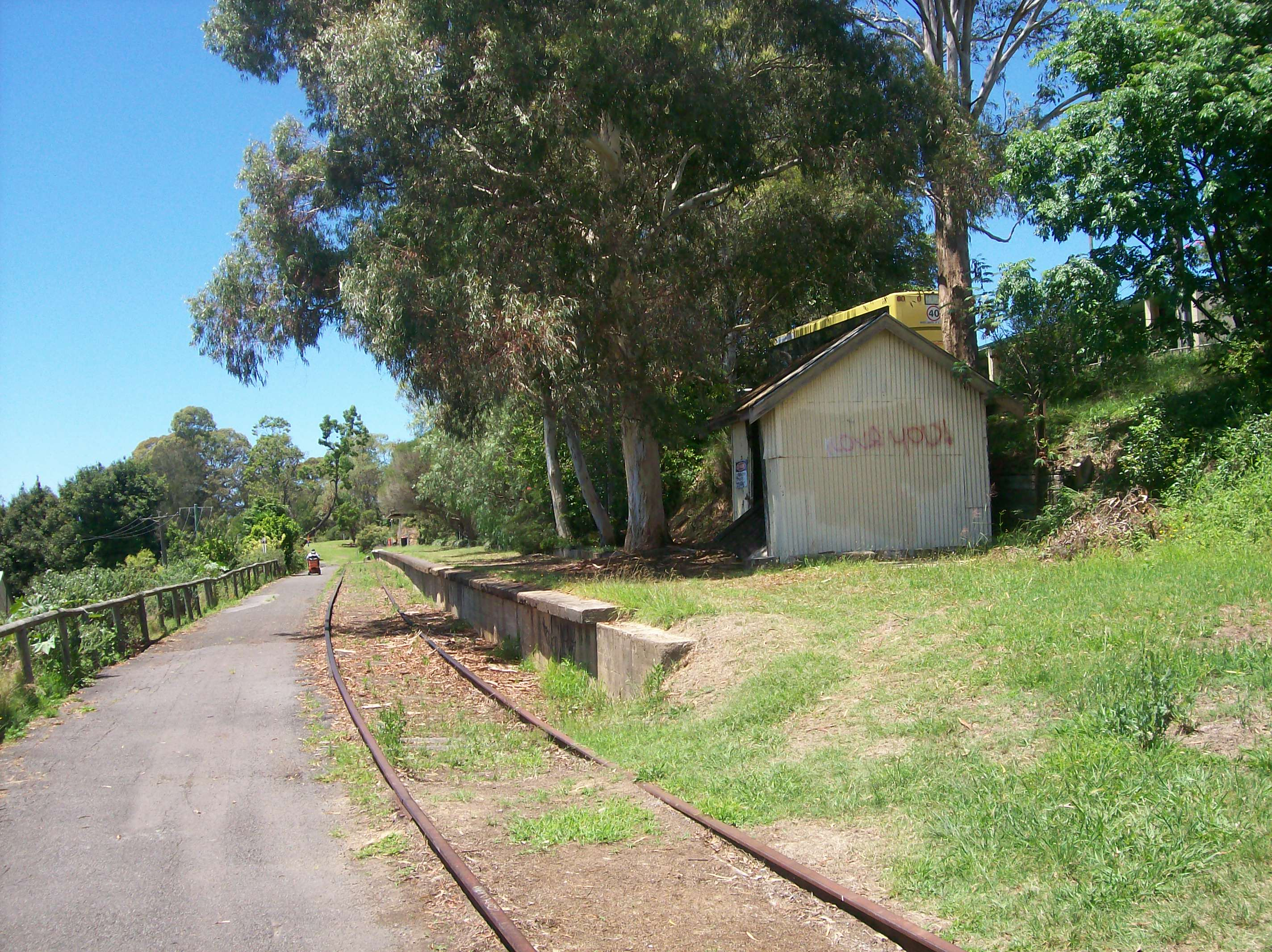
Looking down the platform

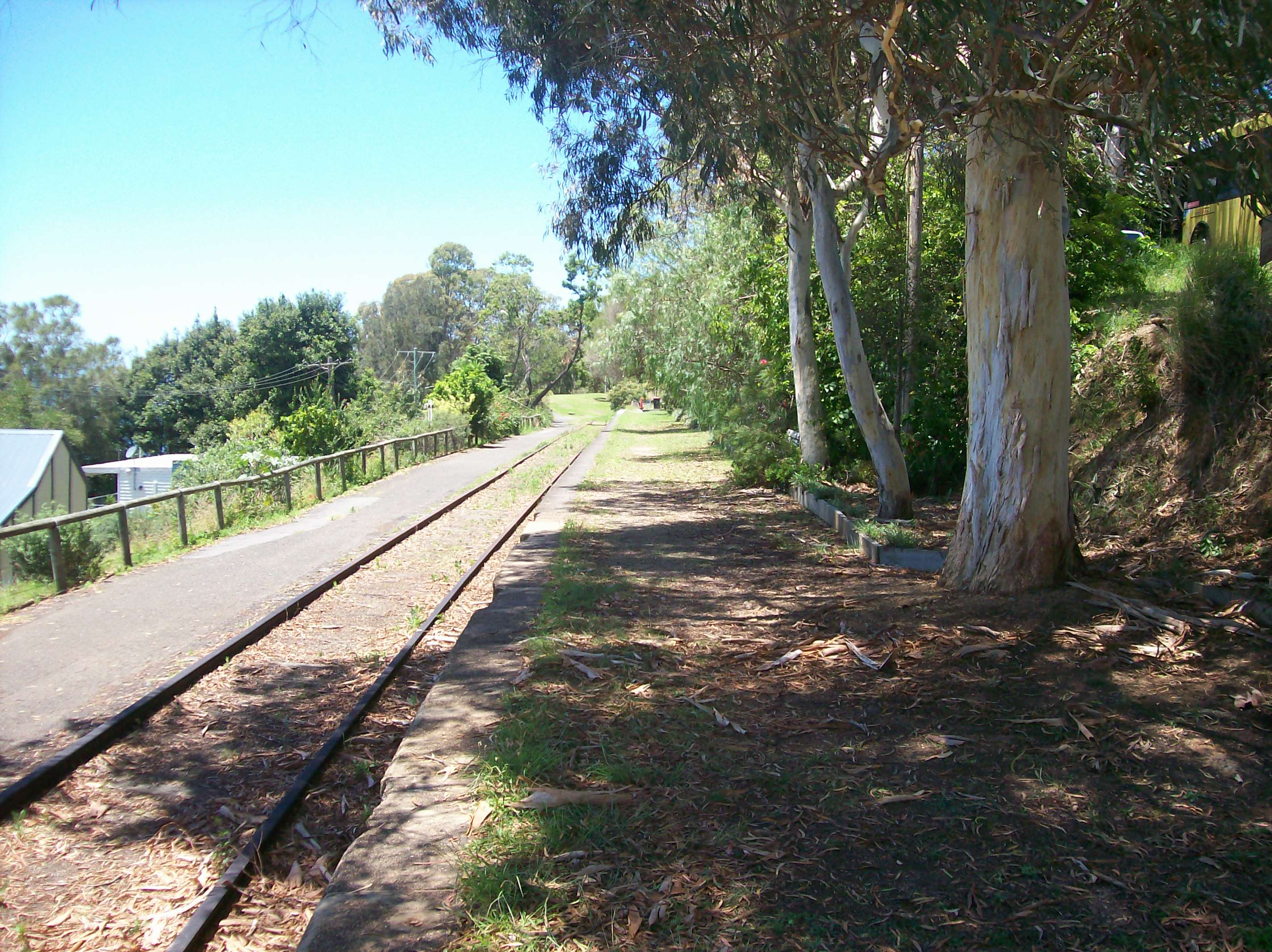
On the platform

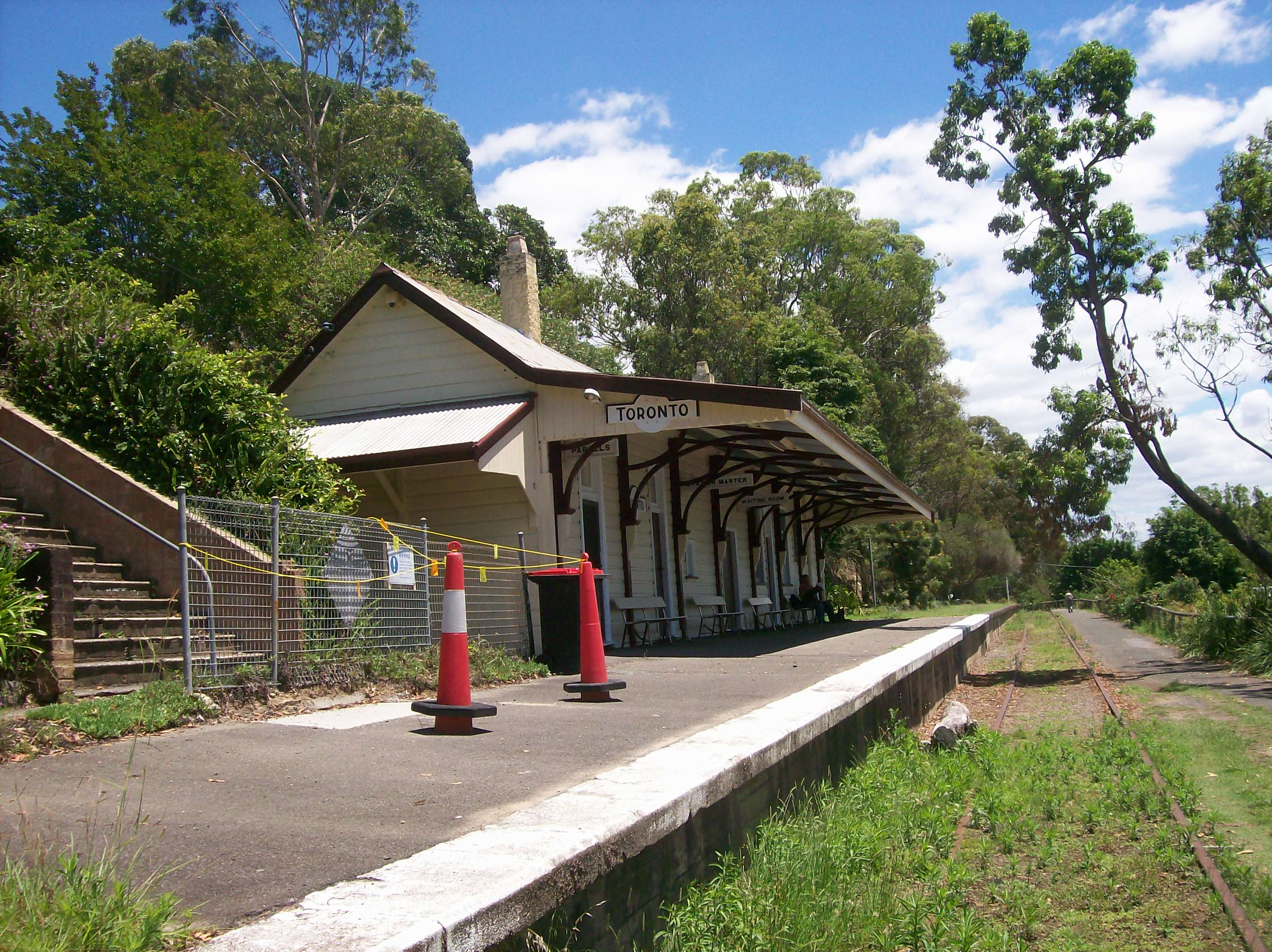
Looking towards station building

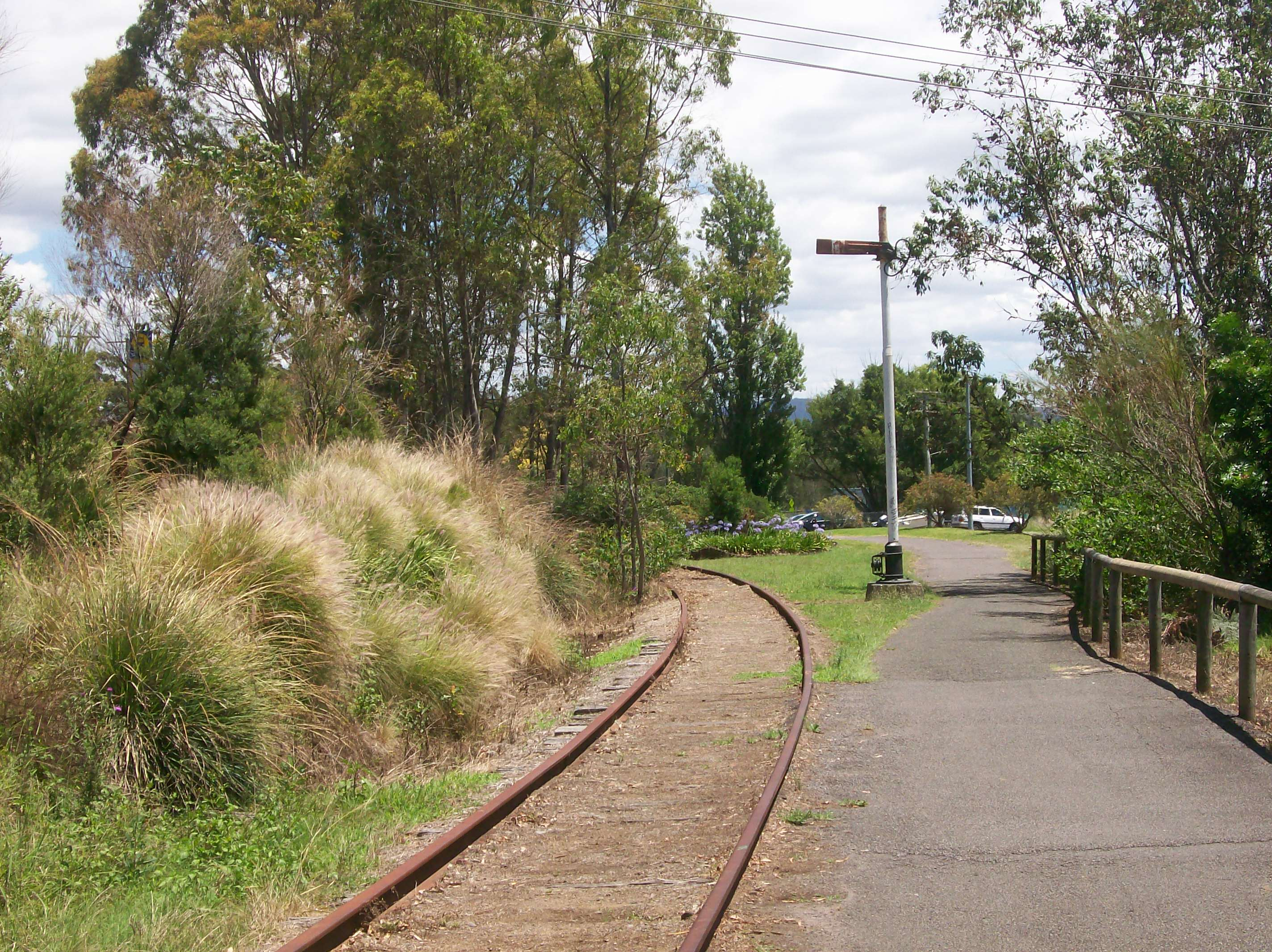
Looking towards Fassifern, with signal

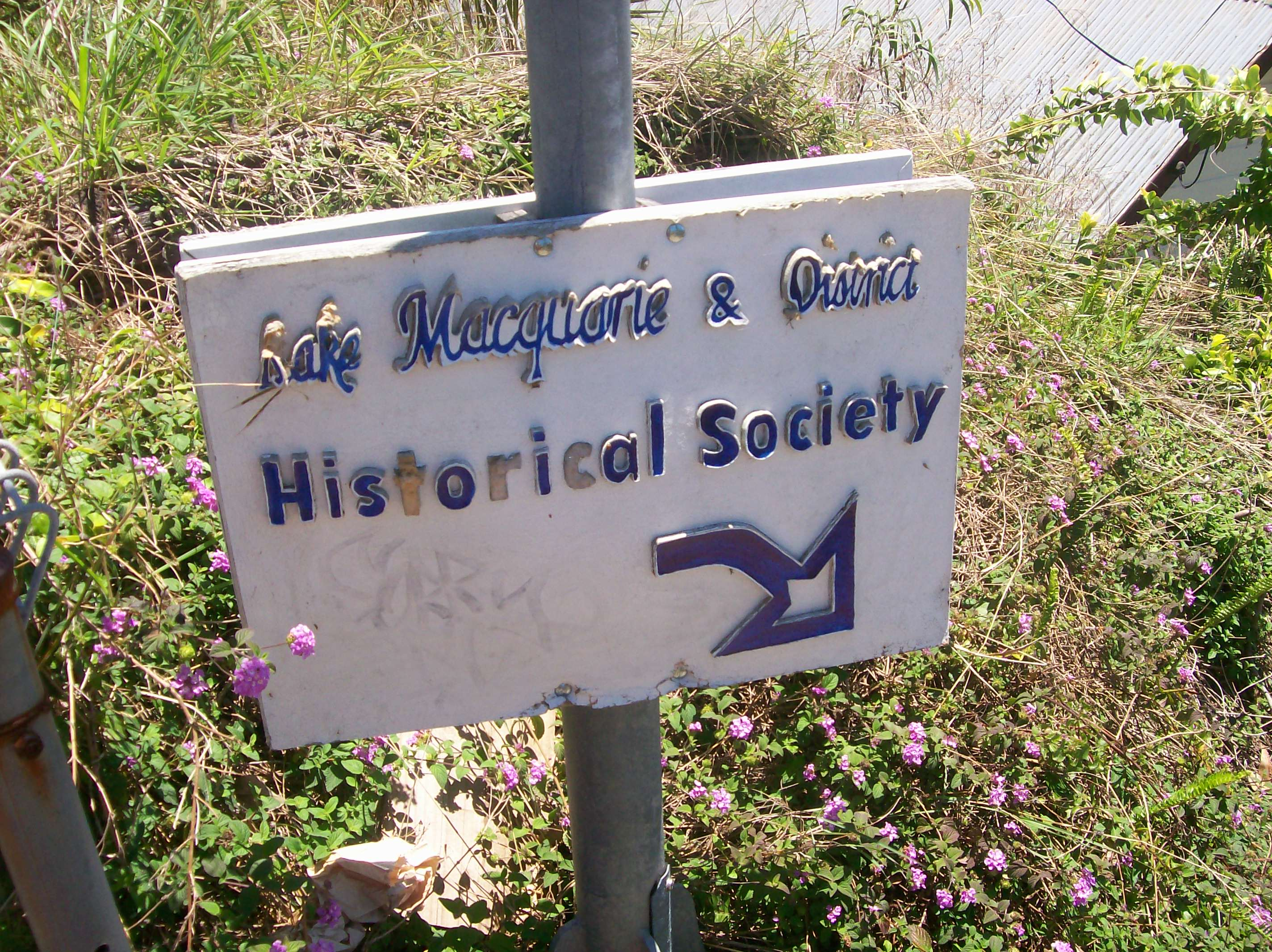
Entrance sign

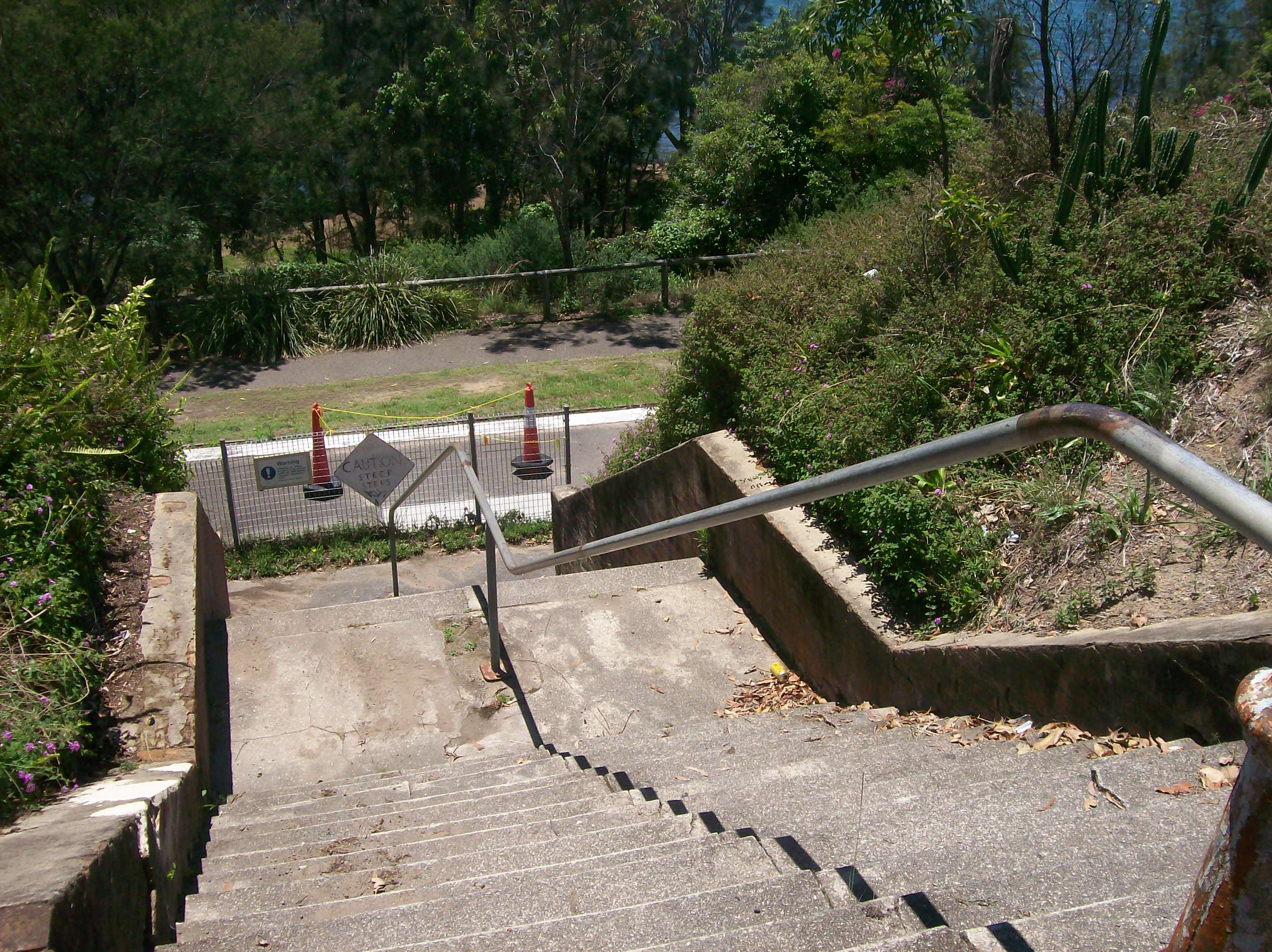
Entrance stairs

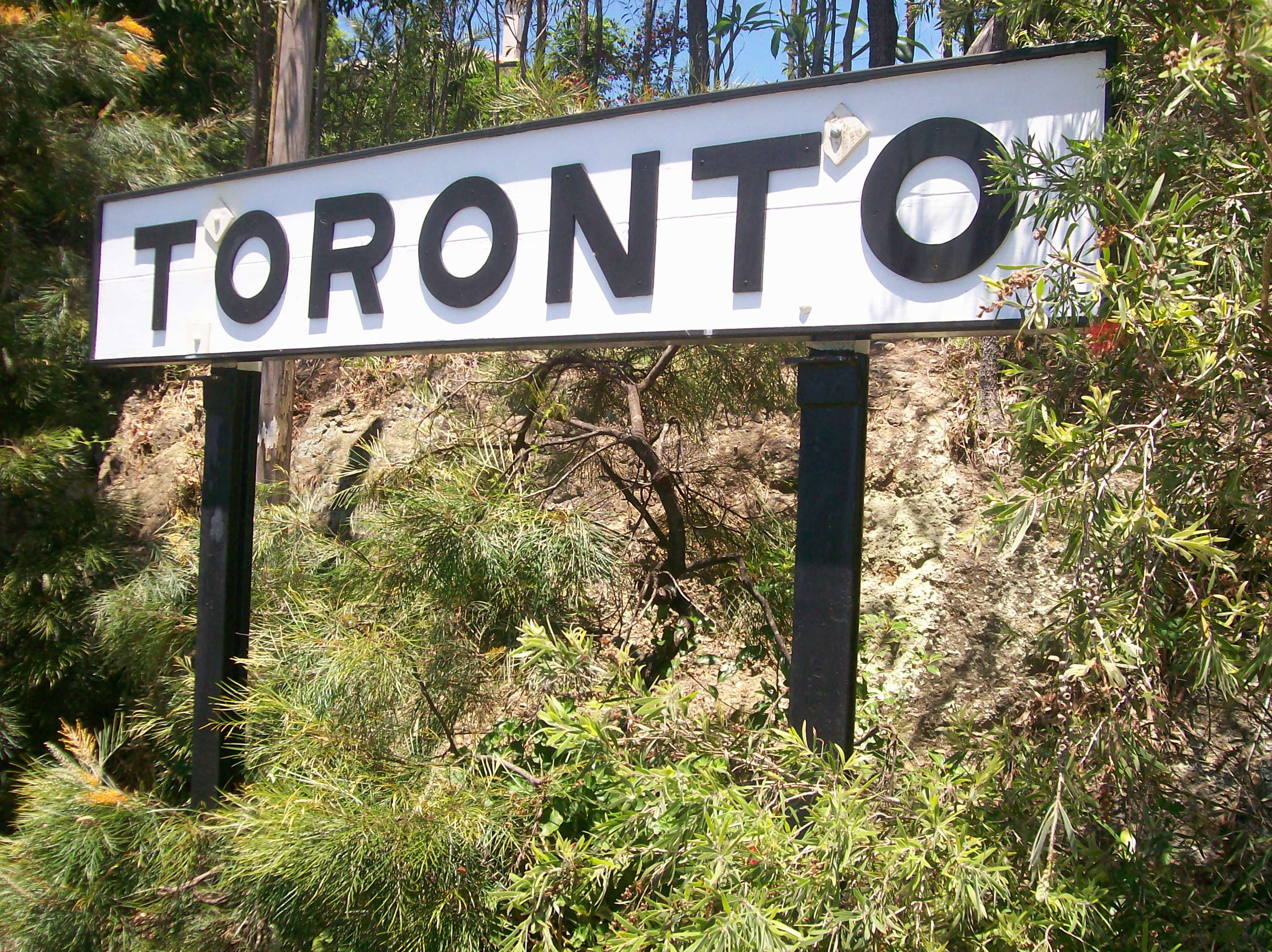
Platform sign

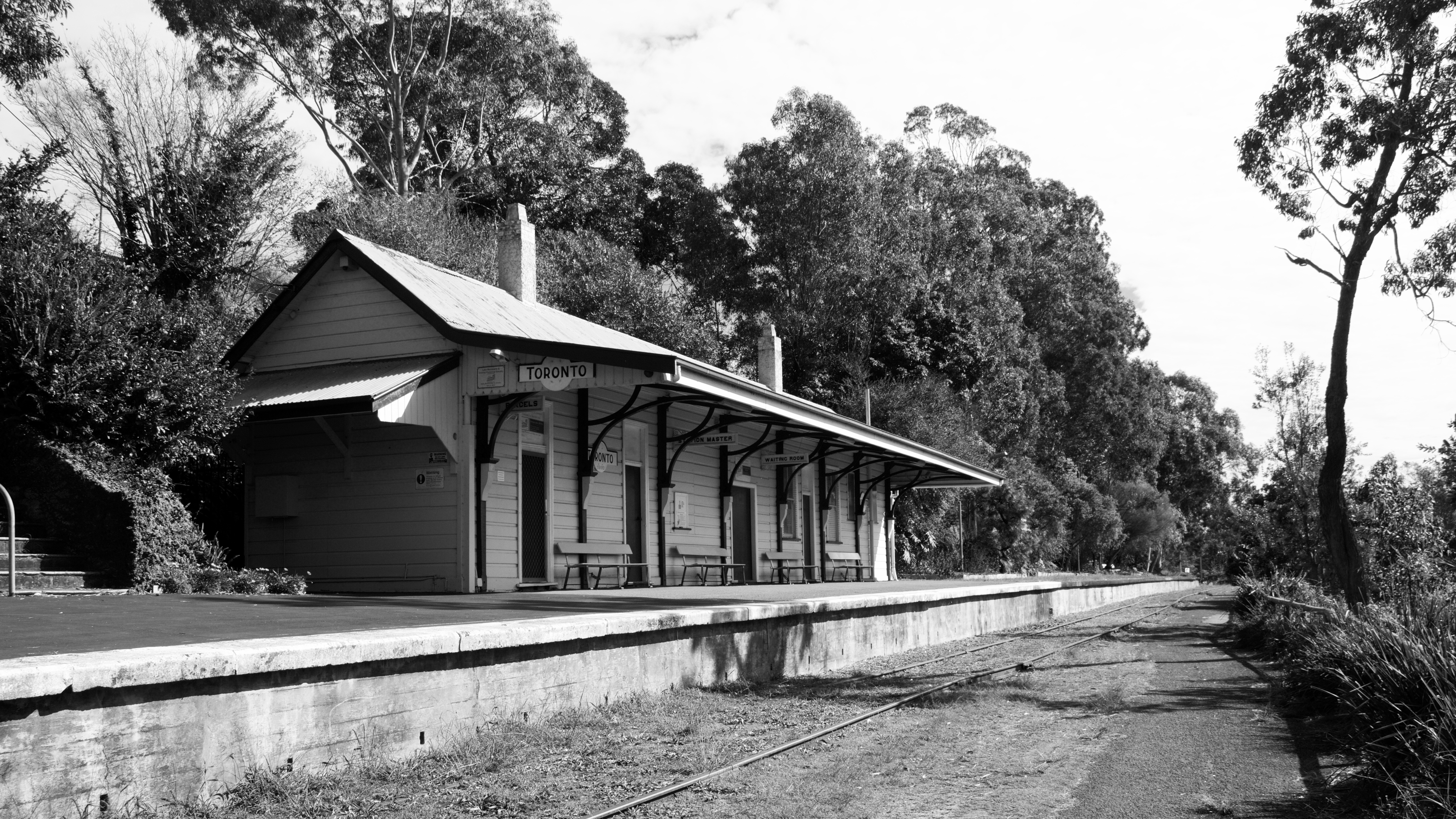
Main platform and station. May 2016
