= Parkville railway station, New South Wales =

Former railway station in New South Wales, Australia

Parkville

General information
- Location: Parkville, New South Wales; Australia
- Coordinates: 31°58′52″S 150°52′05″E
- Operator: Public Transport Commission
- Line: Main North
- Distance: 321.917 km (200.030 mi) from Central
- Platforms: 1 (1 side)
- Tracks: 3

Construction
- Structure type: Ground

Other information
- Status: Demolished

History
- Opened: 9 July 1877
- Closed: c.1979
- Former names: Park (1877–1889)

Services
Preceding station	Former services	Following station
Wingen towards Wallangarra	Main Northern Line	Scone towards Sydney
Location

Parkville railway station was a regional railway station on the Main North line, serving the Hunter Valley town of Parkville. It was opened in 1877, and served passengers until closure c.1979.

== History ==
The station was opened on 9 July 1877, as Park, as an infill station when the Main North line terminated at Murrurundi. Park was renamed Parkville on 1 January 1889.

As well as passengers, the station was used by farmers to transport local produce to Newcastle and Sydney. The initial lack of goods facilities meant that many farmers would instead travel to Scone to load produce. By the early 1900s, a petition was created to request better facilities at Parkville. In 1911, the station was substantially expanded including the construction of a station yard with goods facilities, so as to better provide for both passenger and freight purposes, as well as the appointment of station staff for the first time. The station closed to passenger services c.1979. The platform and station building was subsequently completely demolished after closure.

== Description ==
The station itself consisted of a single brick platform with gravelled surface, and a station building. Three tracks ran through the station: the main line, and two passing loops. As part of the expansion of the station in 1911, a loading bank and stage were built, and a pre-existing weighbridge was upgraded to hold 20 tons of goods at any one time. Also constructed, was a long siding alongside the new station yard.

Access to the area of the station used for goods purposes originally ran over a wooden culvert, which was replaced by a concrete culvert in 1946, due to dilapidation of the wood.
