= Blandford railway station =

Former railway station in New South Wales, Australia

Blandford
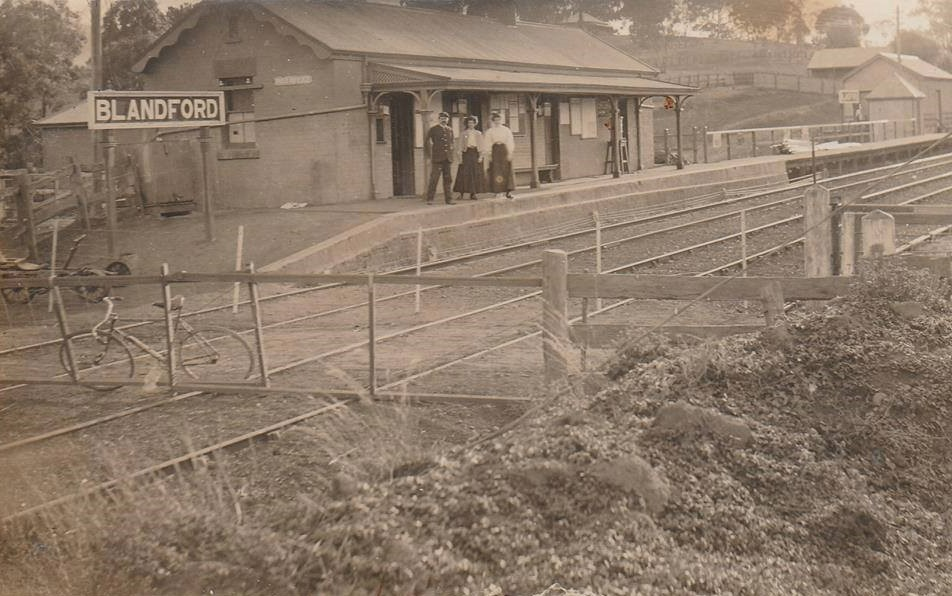
- View of the station and level crossing, pre-1950s.

General information
- Location: White Street, Blandford; New South Wales; Australia
- Coordinates: 31°47′34″S 150°54′09″E
- Operator: Public Transport Commission
- Line: Main North
- Distance: 345.68 km (214.80 mi) from Central
- Platforms: 1 (1 side)
- Tracks: 3

Construction
- Structure type: Ground

Other information
- Status: Demolished

History
- Opened: 4 April 1872 (154 years ago)
- Closed: 1970s

Services
Preceding station	Former services	Following station
Murrurundi towards Wallangarra	Main Northern Line	Wingen towards Sydney
Location

Blandford railway station was a regional railway station located on the Main North line, serving the Hunter Valley town of Blandford in New South Wales. It was opened in 1872, when the railway line was extended from Wingen railway station to Murrurundi railway station.

== History ==
Blandford station was opened in 1872, and was the only intermediate station constructed when the Great Northern Railway was extended from its previous terminus at Wingen, to Murrurundi, as it was justified to serve the "influential squatters and residents" living in the town.

The land located directly next to the station was used for the annual Blandford Children's Picnic, held on New Years Day. All resources including stock, toys and fruits would be delivered to and from the picnic by trains.

On 13 September 1926, the Murulla rail accident, also dubbed the "Blandford railway accident" occurred between Blandford station and the signal box at Murulla when runaway trucks from a goods train collided with the Sydney-bound Northern Mail from Moree, resulting in the deaths of 26 people and another 42 injured. At the time of the railway accident, it was the most deadly to occur in New South Wales, and the second-most deadly in Australia.

The location of the station also meant that Blandford was an important station for the transportation of wool within the Upper Hunter, more so than passenger travel. In the year to 30 June 1928, Blandford recorded 2,617 passenger journeys which ranked fourth-lowest within the Upper Hunter. In comparison, 2,553 bales of wool had been moved through the station, almost 1,000 more bales than recorded at Muswellbrook railway station (1,591 bales of wool) which itself had recorded 33,240 passenger journeys. Trucking yards had previously been proposed to be constructed at the station in 1901 due to the quantity of wool passing through.

The station closed to passenger services in the late 1970s and was completely demolished. However, the adjoining signal box was retained and in the 2010s, a mural was painted on all four sides depicting the monarch butterfly, a species well-recognised within the local environment.

== Description ==
The station consisted of a brick passenger side platform, with two station buildings. Opposite the passenger platform was a loading bank, with a 5 ton jib crane for goods purposes. Three railway tracks ran through the station, with one serving the passenger platform, another forming a passing loop, and the third for a goods siding. Access to the station was provided through a level crossing from White Street to the New England Highway. After closure, the siding and loop were removed, with only a single track remaining.
