= Moonan Flat =

Coordinates: 31°55′20″S 151°14′10″E

- Suburb
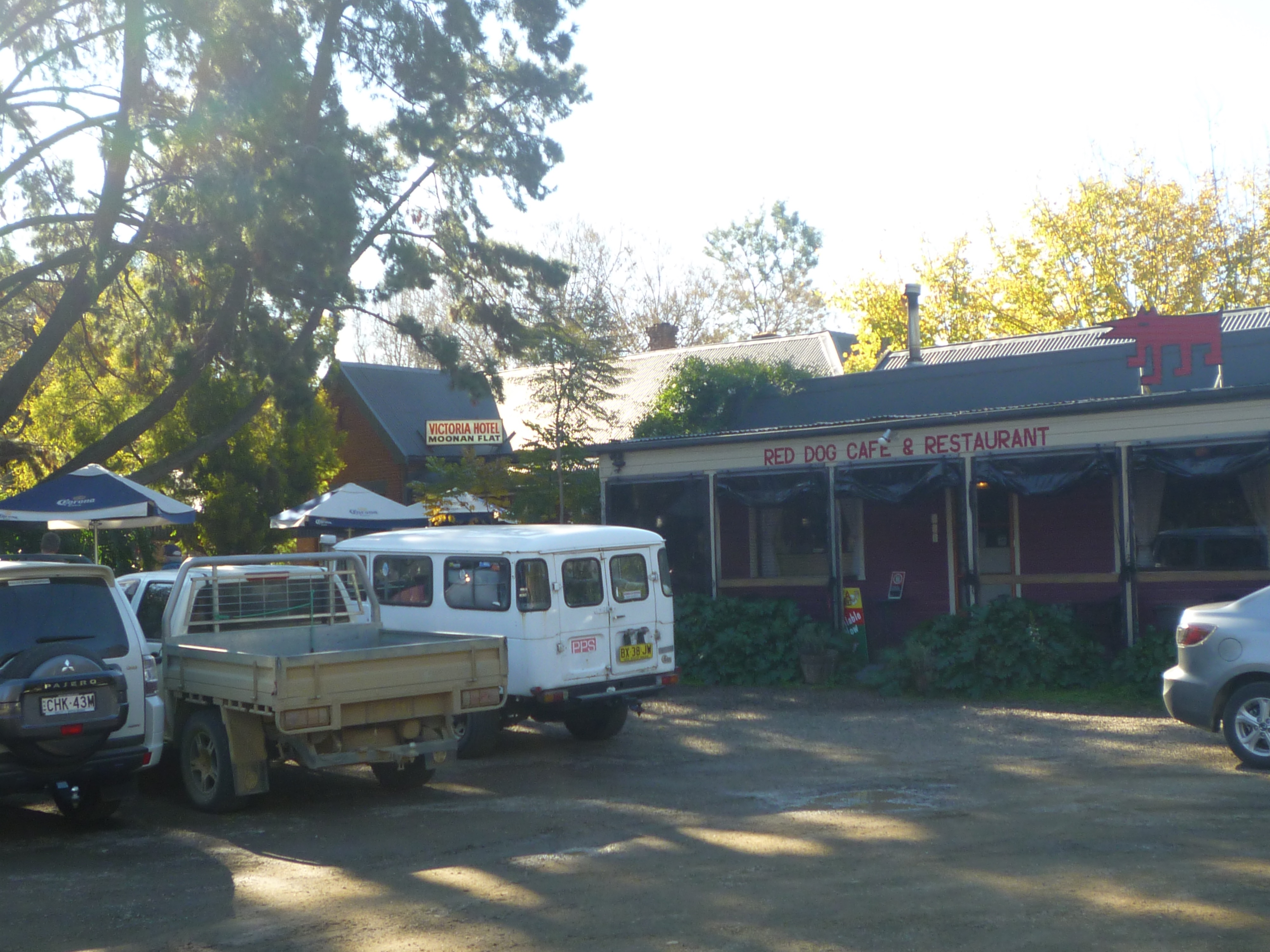
- Victoria Hotel
- Country: Australia
- State: New South Wales
- Region: Hunter
- LGA: Upper Hunter Shire
- Location: 316 km (196 mi) N of Sydney; 51 km (32 mi) NE of Scone

Government
  - State electorate: Upper Hunter
  - Federal division: Hunter

Population
  - Total: unknown (2011)^{Note1}
- Time zone: UTC+10 (AEST)
  - Summer (DST): UTC+11 (AEDT)
- Postcode: 2337
- County: Durham
Suburbs around Moonan Flat
Moonan Flat	Barrington Tops National Park

Moonan Flat is a village in the Upper Hunter Shire local government area, about 51 kilometres (32 mi) north-east of Scone in the Upper Upper Hunter Region of New South Wales, Australia. It is about 316 km (196 mi) from Sydney, the state capital.

== The Village ==
Moonan Flat the closest town to the western entrance to the Barrington Tops National Park. The town is on both sides of the Hunter River, connected by a vehicle bridge and by a suspension footbridge. The nearby locality of Moonan Brook was once a gold mining town on a stream of that name. Although there are only twenty or so houses in the township, the town has a post office, a hotel (The Victoria), a campground and a School of Arts Hall (The Soldiers’ Memorial). The village has a Union Church.

== History ==
Gold was first reported to have been discovered at Moonan Brook in 1855, by Richard Ward. Some nuggets were found in 1856 by Captain Moore. Some time later gold was found in quartz deposits by Moore and a Mr. Simpson. Mining in what was called the Denison Diggings was well under way by 1861. Captain Thunderbolt robbed two miners at Denison Diggings in February 1867.

By 1876, the Denison Diggings at Moonan Brook had passed their prime, there being one company employing twenty to thirty miners. There was one store and one public house, and a school. Moonan Flat also had a school at that time.

The site for a town called Macqueen, just across the Hunter River from Moonan Flat, was reserved in 1871, and it was gazetted in 1885. (Moonan Flat was not a gazetted town, although the two together were generally called Moonan Flat.)

The Victoria Hotel at Moonan Flat was first licensed to Margaret Mitchell in 1898.

A suspension footbridge across the Hunter joining the two was proposed in 1900. Such a bridge still exists.

Tenders were called in 1920 for timber truss bridges across the Hunter River to Moonan Flat at Gundy and Belltrees. There was a dry road to Moonan Flat from the early 1920s. Telephone service was established about 1921.

The Soldier’s Memorial Hall, built by local fund-raising, was opened on 17 February 1926.

A vehicle bridge was built in 1958 connecting Moonan Flat with Macqueen, and the two towns were formally merged. That bridge was replaced in 1984 by the present Rex Collison bridge, named for an Upper Hunter Shire Councillor who lived in the area.

== Notes ==
1. The Australian Bureau of Statistics does not provide population data for Moonan Flat, only its suburb, which includes several other localities. The population of the suburb, at the time of the 2011 Census, was 274.

== See also ==
- Moonan Flat travel guide from Wikivoyage
