= Wingen, New South Wales =

Wingen
- Town
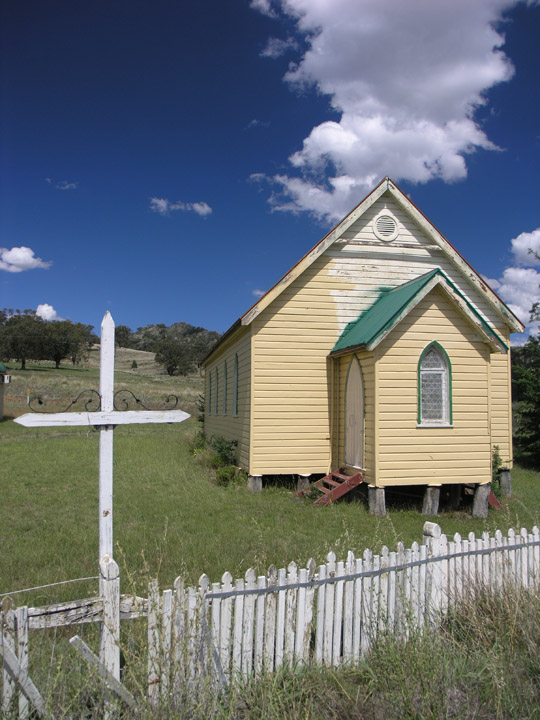
- "Old Church", New England Highway, Wingen

- Coordinates: 31°53′S 150°52′E
- Country: Australia
- State: New South Wales
- Region: Hunter Region
- LGA: Upper Hunter Shire
- Location: 343 km (213 mi) NW of Sydney; 19 km (12 mi) N of Scone; 23 km (14 mi) S of Murrurundi; 168 km (104 mi) NW of Newcastle

Government
  - State electorate: Upper Hunter
  - Federal division: New England
- Elevation: 292 m (958 ft)

Population
  - Total: 323 (2016 census)
- Postcode: 2337
- County: Brisbane
- Parish: Wingen
Localities around Wingen
Blandford
Wingen
Parkville

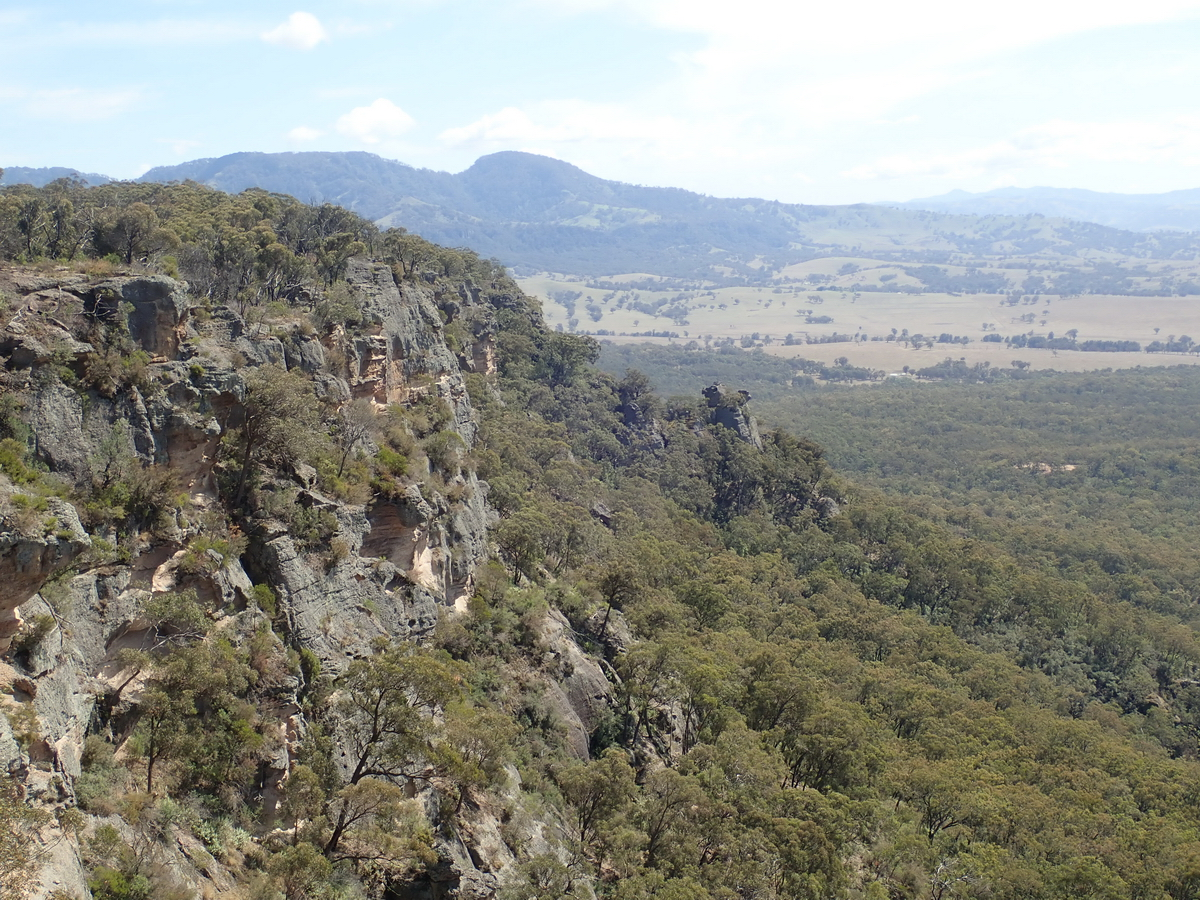
Wingen Maid

Wingen /ˈwɪndʒən/ is a village in the Upper Hunter Shire, in the Hunter Region of New South Wales, Australia. Situated on the New England Highway, it lies about 15 minutes from the town of Scone. It is known for the local Burning Mountain tourist attraction, a burning underground coal seam. Wingen has a population of just several hundred people.

Its few businesses include an antique store and a pub.

The town is known for the Burning Mountain, which according to scientists is the world's oldest known coal fire, and has been burning for approximately 6,000 years. Explorers in the 19th century mistook its smoking summit for a volcano. In fact the name Wingen comes from the local Aboriginal language, and means "fire".

The Wingen Maid is a rock formation in the local Wingen Maid Nature Reserve which resembles a woman when viewed from a particular direction.

Wingen was served by Wingen railway station on the Main North railway line between 1871 and 1975.

== Heritage listings ==
Wingen has a number of heritage-listed sites, including:

- Raglan Street: Mountain House, Wingen
