= Mountain House, Wingen =

- Location within New South Wales Location within Australia
- 31°53′25″S 150°52′45″E
- Location: Raglan Street, Wingen, Upper Hunter Shire, New South Wales, Australia

History
- Built: 1882
- Built for: NSW Department of Education

Site notes
- Architect(s): William Kemp (Department of Education architect)

New South Wales Heritage Register
- Official name: Mountain House; Wingen Public School
- Type: State heritage (built)
- Designated: 2 April 1999
- Reference no.: 311
- Type: House
- Category: Residential buildings (private)

Mountain House is a heritage-listed former teachers residence and school room and now residence at Raglan Street, Wingen, Upper Hunter Shire, New South Wales, Australia. It was designed by William Kemp, the Department of Education architect. It is also known as Wingen Public School. It was added to the New South Wales State Heritage Register on 2 April 1999.

== History ==
The building was designed in 1882 by the Department of Education architect, William Kemp and was built by Mr J. Johnstone at the cost of A£1,185. It consisted of a schoolroom and teachers residence. This use is evidenced by the two entrance doors at the front for the schoolroom and the teachers residence respectively. Behind the main building is a brick kitchen block which was once linked to the main building by a breezeway.

In 1980 the owner of the property Mr B. Laurie applied for financial assistance to help restore Mountain House. The application was unsuccessful as the significance of the house had not been established. In 1983 Mr Laurie again applied for funding and nominated Mountain View House for a Permanent Conservation Order. The owner was also concerned that future road widen proposals may affect the property.

To ensure conservation work done by the owners was not compromised in the future and in recognition of its historic, architectural and social value a Permanent Conservation Order was placed over the property on 22 March 1985.

It was transferred to the State Heritage Register on 2 April 1999.

== Description ==
Mountain House stands beside the New England Highway in the village of Wingen between Scone and Murrurundi. It is a single storey painted brick structure with a corrugated iron roof and front verandah both of which are of hipped form.

Its past use is evidenced by the two entrance doors at the front elevation, being for the schoolroom and teachers residence respectively. Behind the main building is a brick kitchen block which was once linked to the main building by a breezeway. This has been sympathetically extended by the present owner to provide additional accommodation. Beyond the kitchen block is a recent hipped roofed garage and storage shed which complements the adjacent structures.

== Heritage listing ==
Mountain House is a single storey Colonial style building, built in 1882 to the design of the Department of Education architect, William Kemp.

Mountain House was listed on the New South Wales State Heritage Register on 2 April 1999 having satisfied the following criteria.

The place is important in demonstrating the course, or pattern, of cultural or natural history in New South Wales.

Mountain House is a single storey Colonial style building, built in 1882 to the design of the Department of Education architect, William Kemp.
