= Murulla rail accident =

Railway accident in Murulla, Australia

Details
- Date: 13 September 1926
- Location: Murulla; 224.9 km (139.7 mi) NNW from Sydney
- Country: Australia
- Line: Main Northern railway line
- Operator: New South Wales Government Railways
- Incident type: Collision
- Cause: Runaway vehicles from goods train

Statistics
- Trains: 2
- Deaths: 26

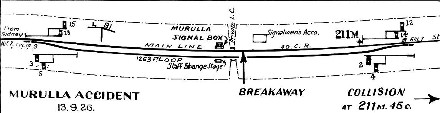
Track layout

On 13 September 1926, the Sydney-bound Northern Mail collided with a runaway goods wagon near Murrurundi, in the Upper Hunter Valley and killed 26 people. A goods train had become divided and the attempts of the train crew to reunite the portions resulted in 12 vehicles running away down a steep gradient, and colliding with the approaching mail train. This was the worst accident on the New South Wales rail network until the Granville railway disaster in 1977.

== Incident ==
The signal box at Murulla controlled a loop line for trains to pass on a single-line railway; no other connections were at the location. Electric Train Staff operated between Wingen and Murulla and Electric Tablet operated between Murulla and Blandford.

Train number 62, a southbound goods train, comprised a standard goods engine hauling 34 wagons and a brake van were to pass through Murulla on the main line. Another goods train, number 95, working in the opposing direction, had entered the loop line and was waiting for number 62 to pass. Number 62 had a length of 951 feet (290 m) and a load of 746 tons (758 t). All vehicles were fitted with Westinghouse air brakes.

The train slowed at Murulla signalbox for the exchange of the single-line tokens, and as the train staff for the onward section was received, the driver of number 62 put on steam. The shock resulted in the train becoming divided, with the rear 12 vehicles separating from the main train. This was later attributed to the failure of a drawhook. The division of the train was noticed by the driver and both portions of the train were safely brought to a stand.

Both portions of the train were verified to be within the clearance points of the loop line, so train number 95 was permitted to depart.

The detached portion of number 62 consisted of 12 vehicles, and its length 331 feet with a weight of 264 tons. Handbrakes were applied to these vehicles. The train staff in the possession of the engine crew apparently was returned to the instrument in the signal box at this time, and all vehicles were within the confines of the home signals.

After a number of attempts to fit a tailrope, the brake van had been shunted back, foul of the clearance point for the loop line. The two opposing vehicles at the separation were finally hitched with a single wire rope connection, but the airbrake hoses could not be connected. The signalman then requested that the train be brought forward so that it was clear of the clearance point so as to permit the approaching southbound number 8 mail train to pass through the loop.

The guard of number 62 released the handbrakes on the rear portion, leaving it unbraked, and the driver went forward to his engine. When he started the train, the tailrope broke and the rear portion began to run back down the grade towards Blandford, coming into collision with the approaching mail train just beyond the Up Distant signal. The collision resulted in the death of 26 persons. (Gunn has 27 fatalities.)

== Coronial inquest ==
Following the disaster, a coronial inquest was held at Murrurundi, with evidence being taken over eight days. On 9 October 1926, the district coroner committed the driver and guard of the goods train for trial. He noted that no pin was in the train's guard's brake van to enable the two portions of the train to be coupled in accordance with regulations. Had the portions been properly coupled, the Westinghouse brake pipe hoses could have been connected so that in the event of a further break-away, the brakes on the rear portion would have been automatically applied. In the absence of that pin, essential principles of safe working had been overlooked.

== Criminal court proceedings ==
On 6 December, the driver and guard appeared at the Central Criminal Court, charged with felonious slaying one of the mail train's passengers. The crown prosecutor alleged, "if the accused failed to link up the air brakes when the appliances were there, they were guilty of gross negligence."

In his summing up, Justice Ferguson said, "the charge of manslaughter could be established only if the crown proved gross negligence, criminal in character, and deserving of punishment". On 8 December, the two men were acquitted.
