= Wingen railway station =

Former railway station in New South Wales, Australia

Wingen

General information
- Location: New England Highway, Wingen, New South Wales; Australia
- Coordinates: 31°53′46″S 150°52′51″E
- Operator: Public Transport Commission
- Line: Main North
- Distance: 331.450 km from Central
- Platforms: 1 (1 side)
- Tracks: 3

Construction
- Structure type: Ground

Other information
- Status: Demolished

History
- Opened: 1 August 1871
- Closed: 8 March 1975

Services
Preceding station	Former services	Following station
Blandford towards Wallangarra	Main Northern Line	Parkville towards Sydney
Location

Wingen railway station was a railway station on the Main North railway line, serving the town of Wingen, New South Wales. It was open between 1871 and 1975, briefly serving as the terminus of the line until it was extended to Murrurundi railway station.

== History ==
Wingen station was opened in 1871, and was the terminus for passenger services until the Main North line was extended north through Blandford to Murrurundi the following year, in 1872.

Wingen station was used by tourists visiting the Burning Mountain (Mount Wingen), as the station was situated around three kilometres from the mountain itself.

The station closed to passenger services in 1975 and was subsequently completely demolished. However, the adjoining signal box was retained, and in 2023, a mural was unveiled to celebrate the local community's connection to nature and the railway's historical significance to the region. The mural adorns all sides of the signal box, and pays homage to the railway station as well as the Wingen Maid, a rock formation significant to the local Wonnarua people.

== Description ==
The station consisted of a brick passenger side platform, with two wooden station buildings and substantial gardens. Opposite the passenger platform was a goods shed and loading bank. There were three railway tracks through the station consisting of a loop and siding, however, this was removed after closure, with only a single track remaining.
