= Upper Hunter Shire =

- Local government area
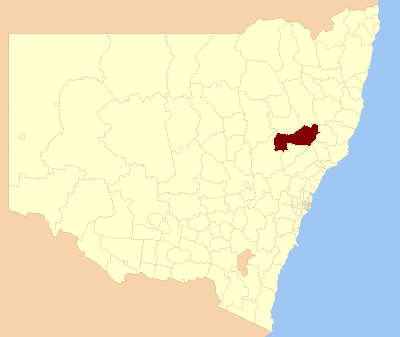
- Location in New South Wales

- Interactive map of Upper Hunter Shire
- Coordinates: 32°05′S 150°51′E
- Country: Australia
- State: New South Wales
- Region: Hunter
- Council seat: Scone

Government
  - Mayor: Maurice Collison
  - State electorate: Upper Hunter
  - Federal divisions: Calare; New England

Area
  - Total: 8,096 km^{2} (3,126 sq mi)

Population
  - Total: 14,229 (2021 census)
  - Density: 1.8/km^{2} (4.7/sq mi)
- Time zone: UTC+10 (AEST)
  - Summer (DST): UTC+11 (AEDT)
- Website: Upper Hunter Shire
LGAs around Upper Hunter Shire
Liverpool Plains	Tamworth	Walcha
Warrumbungle	Upper Hunter Shire	MidCoast
Mid-Western	Muswellbrook	Dungog

The Upper Hunter Shire is a local government area in the Upper Hunter Valley of New South Wales, Australia. The Shire was formed in May 2004 from the Scone Shire and parts of Murrurundi and Merriwa shires.

The mayor of the Upper Hunter Shire Council is Cr. Maurice Collison, following the sudden resignation of Wayne Bedggood as mayor and as a councillor on 9 June 2020. No reason has been given for the sudden resignation.

Council's General Manager is Greg McDonald.

== Towns ==
The towns of the Upper Hunter are Scone, Parkville, Aberdeen, Murrurundi, and Merriwa, as well as several villages, including Bunnan, Gundy, Moonan Flat, Ellerston, Wingen, Blandford and Cassilis. Of the towns, only Aberdeen on the Shire's southeastern border is situated on the Hunter River.

== Heritage listings ==
The Upper Hunter Shire has a number of heritage-listed sites, including:

- Ardglen, Main Northern railway: Ardglen Tunnel
- Merriwa, Bow Street: Colonial Cottage Museum
- Murrurundi, Main Northern railway: Murrurundi railway station
- Murrurundi, Mount Street: Rosedale Cottage
- Scone, 144 Kelly Street: Scone Civic Theatre
- Scone, 41 Kingdon Road: Old Court Theatre
- Scone, Main Northern railway: Scone railway station
- Wingen, Raglan Street: Mountain House, Wingen

== Demographics ==
At the 2021 census, there were 14,229 people in the Upper Hunter Shire local government area, of these 50.0 percent were male and 50.0 percent were female. Aboriginal and Torres Strait Islander people made up 7.0 percent of the population, which was higher than the national and state averages of 3.4 and 3.2 percent respectively. The median age of people in the Upper Hunter Shire was 42 years, which was marginally higher than the national median of 38 years. Children aged 0–14 years made up 18.6 percent of the population and people aged 65 years and over made up 21.2 percent of the population. Of people in the area aged 15 years and over, 47.3 per cent were married and 13.1 per cent were either divorced or separated.

Population growth in the Upper Hunter Shire between the 2006 census and the 2011 census was 6.00 percent. When compared with the total population growth of Australia for the same period, at 8.32 percent, population growth in the Upper Hunter Shire local government area was slightly lower than the national average. The median weekly income for residents within the Upper Hunter Shire was marginally lower than the national average.

At the 2021 census, the proportion of residents in the Upper Hunter Shire local government area who stated their ancestry as Australian or English exceeded 85 percent of all residents (the national average was 62.9 percent). In excess of 29% of all residents in the Upper Hunter Shire nominated a religious affiliation with Anglican at the 2021 census, which was considerably higher than the national average of 9.8 percent. Meanwhile, as at the 2021 census date, compared to the national average, households in the Upper Hunter Shire local government area had a significantly lower than average proportion (5.3 percent) where two or more languages are spoken (the national average was 24.8 percent); and a significantly higher proportion 89.5 percent where only English was spoken at home (the national average was 72.0 percent).

Selected historical census data for the Upper Hunter Shire local government area
Census year		2006	2011	2016	2021
Population	Estimated residents on Census night	12,976	▲13,754	▲14,112	14,229
Population	LGA rank in terms of size within New South Wales				
Population	% of New South Wales population	0.19%	▲0.20%	▼0.18%	▼0.17%
Population	% of Australian population	0.07%	0.07%	▼0.06%	▼0.05%
Cultural and language diversity					
Ancestry, top responses	Australian	–	36.6%	▼35.7%	▲45.3%
Ancestry, top responses	English	–	32.4%	▼30.5%	▲42.7%
Ancestry, top responses	Irish	–	8.2%	▲8.7%	▲11.7%
Ancestry, top responses	Scottish	–	7.9%	▼7.6%	▲10.5%
Ancestry, top responses	German		2.8%	2.8%	–
Ancestry, top responses	Australian Aboriginal	–	–	–	6.4%
Language, top responses (other than English)	Mandarin	n/c	0.2%	▲0.3%	▲0.7%
Language, top responses (other than English)	Portuguese	n/c	0.2%	–	0.2%
Language, top responses (other than English)	Filipino	0.3%	▼0.2%	▲0.3%	0.3%
Language, top responses (other than English)	Cantonese	0.2%	▼0.1%	▲0.2%	0.2%
Language, top responses (other than English)	Arabic	n/c	▲0.1%	–	–
Language, top responses (other than English)	Tagalog	0.1%	0.1%	▲0.2%	–
Language, top responses (other than English)	French	–	–	–	0.2%
Religious affiliation					
Religious affiliation, top responses	Anglican	41.3%	▼39.3%	▼35.1%	▼29.9%
Religious affiliation, top responses	Catholic	27.2%	▼26.9%	▼25.9%	▼22.9%
Religious affiliation, top responses	No Religion	9.7%	▲13.4%	▲16.7%	▲28.8%
Religious affiliation, top responses	Uniting Church	6.5%	▼5.6%	▼4.4%	▼3.7%
Religious affiliation, top responses	Presbyterian and Reformed	3.2%	▼3.3%	–	–
Median weekly incomes					
Personal income	Median weekly personal income	$438	▲$552	▲$630	▲$751
Personal income	% of Australian median income	94.0%	▲95.7%	▼95.1%	▼93.2%
Family income	Median weekly family income	A$1,090	▲ A$1,392	▲ A$1,589	▲ A$1,914
Family income	% of Australian median income	93.1%	▲94.0%	▼91.6%	▼90.2%
Household income	Median weekly household income	A$882	▲ A$1,071	▲ A$1,242	▲ A$1,429
Household income	% of Australian median income	85.9%	▲86.8%	▼86.3%	▼81.8%

== Council ==
=== Current composition and election method ===
Upper Hunter Shire Council is composed of nine councillors elected by Optional Preferential Voting as a single ward. All councillors are elected for a fixed four-year term of office. The mayor is elected by the councillors at the first meeting of the council. The most recent election was held on 4 December 2021 and the makeup of the council is as follows:

Party	Councillor
Independents	Allison McPhee
Independents	Maurice Blackburn
Independents	James Burns
Independents	Tayah Clout
Independents	Ron Campbell
Independents	Elizabeth Flaherty
Independents	Belinda McKenzie
Independents	Lee Watts
Independents	Adam Williamson
Greens	Sue Abbott
Total	9

== Election results ==
=== 2024 ===
2024 New South Wales local elections: Upper Hunter
Party	Candidate	Votes	%	±%
Independent	Maurice Collison (elected)	1,197	14.6	−5.5
Independent	Peter McGill (elected)	1,173	14.3	
Independent	George Fraser (elected)	1,038	12.7	
Independent	Troy Stolz (elected)	893	10.9	
Independent	Tayah Clout (elected)	653	8.0	+3.0
Independent	Earle Shields (elected)	624	7.6	
Independent National	Pat Ryan (elected)	595	7.3	
Independent	Adam Williamson (elected)	582	7.1	+1.6
Independent National	Allison McPhee (elected)	573	7.0	+1.2
Independent National	James Burns	539	6.6	+0.6
Independent	Christopher Richards	338	4.1	
Total formal votes		8,205	92.5	
Informal votes		669	7.5	
Turnout		8,874	84.1	

== Attractions ==
The Upper Hunter is the largest horse-rearing region in Australia.

The Burning Mountain Nature Reserve, near Wingen, is the site of a subterranean coal seam fire that has been burning for several thousand years.

The council also owns several FM rebroadcasters of Radio National and SBS Radio, under the self-help schemes run by those broadcasters.
