= Scone Post Office =

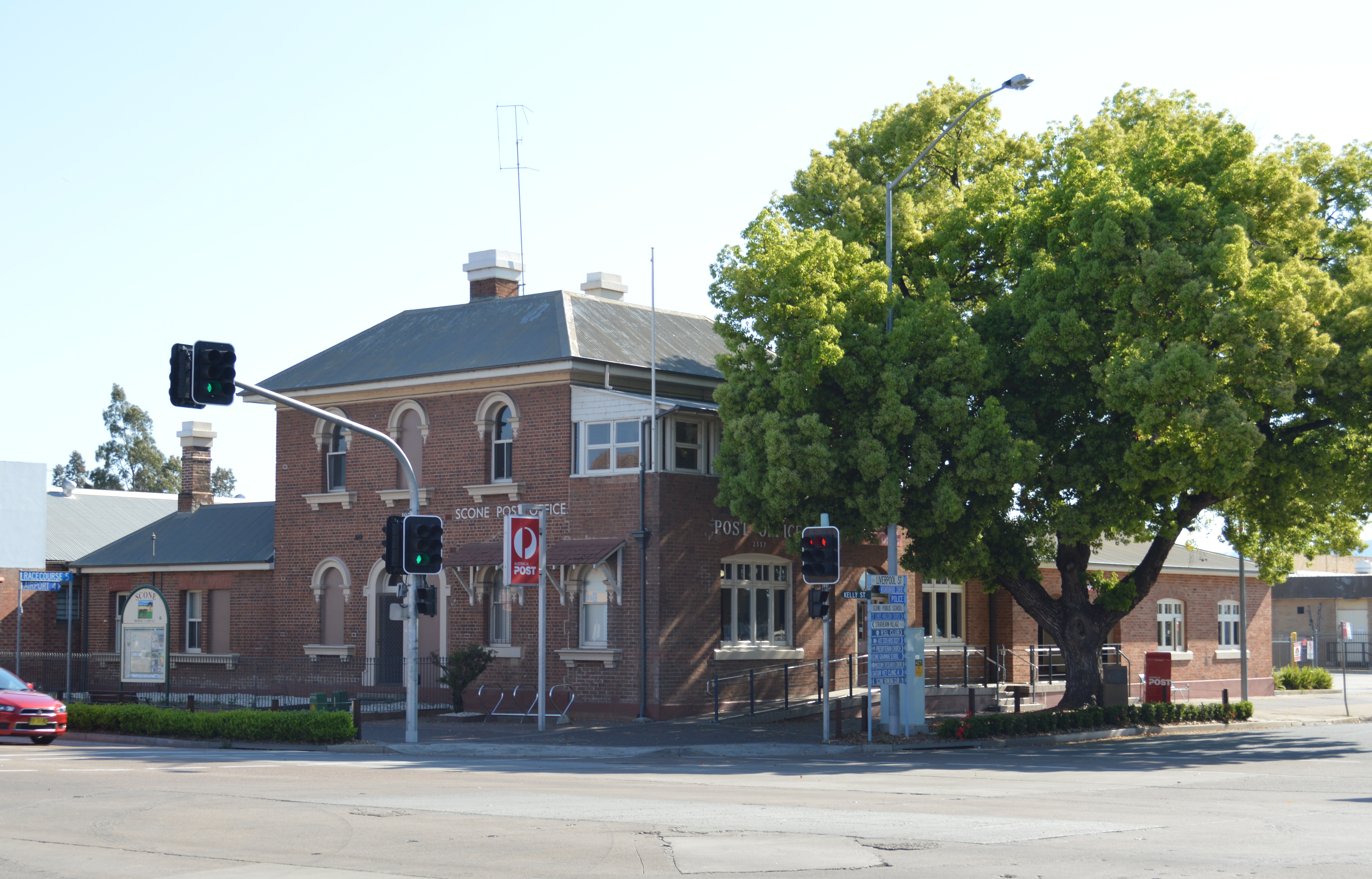
- Scone Post Office, 2015

- Location within New South Wales
- 32.0509°S 150.8670°E
- Location: 117 Liverpool Street, Scone, New South Wales, Australia

History
- Built: 1879

Site notes
- Architect: New South Wales Colonial Architect's Office under James Barnet

Commonwealth Heritage List
- Official name: Scone Post Office
- Type: Listed place (Historic)
- Designated: 22 August 2012
- Reference no.: 106199

Scone Post Office is a heritage-listed post office at 117 Liverpool Street, Scone, New South Wales, Australia. It was designed by the New South Wales Colonial Architect's office under the control of James Barnet and built in 1879. It was added to the Australian Commonwealth Heritage List on 22 August 2012.

== History ==
Scone is located in the Hunter Valley, north of Sydney. The town is the commercial and administrative centre of a pastoral, agricultural and dairying district noted for its horse and cattle studs. The first European in the area was surveyor Henry Dangar who, in 1824, passed by the area just west of the present town site and crossed over the Liverpool Range. Dangar's favourable report on the district led to an immediate land grab by wealthy settlers including Francis Little who established Invermein in 1825. A village named Redbank began to emerge by 1828 but the traffic began to shift to the east following a new route (the Great North Road) into the Hunter Valley. In 1836, an inn and store were established adjacent to this track, forming the beginnings of the settlement of Scone. The newer settlement, officially called Invermein was later gazetted in 1837 as Scone. Development proceeded, albeit slowly, in the 1840s, with an Anglican church, school and a courthouse. A national school opened in 1863 and in 1871, the railway arrived.

A telegraph office was established at Scone in 1877, and in 1879, the current building (post and telegraph office with associated quarters) was constructed by the New South Wales Colonial Architect's office under the control of James Barnet. Additions to this building were undertaken in c. 1908 by the New South Wales Government Architect's Office architect Walter Vernon and in 1914 by the Commonwealth Department of Works and Railways Office under George Oakeshott/E. Henderson. A small addition was added to the Liverpool Street frontage, and in the 1960s a further single-storey addition provided a post office box lobby and additional staff areas along the Liverpool Street frontage.

== Description ==
Scone Post Office is at 117 Liverpool Street, corner Kelly Street, Scone, comprising the whole of Lot 3 DP 700953.

Scone Post Office is a substantial double-storey, hipped-roof brick building which dates from 1879, with later additions, and is located on the south-west corner of the town's major intersection, Liverpool and Kelly Streets. The building had its main entrance to the north (Liverpool Street), with the quarters originally entered from the east (Kelly Street).

The original 1870s posted verandah to Liverpool Street was removed to make way for the Federation-era addition which enlarged the main postal chamber. This addition includes recessed panels of rough cast stucco to the brickwork and is framed with a brick coping. The main entrance bay is set slightly forward of the flanking bays. The entry door has a fanlight and fixed sidelights. A concrete ramp and steps are a later addition. The balcony roof is a skillion roof form but there is a small gablet positioned above the entrance. Originally the balcony roof was supported by pairs – with the exception of the clustered set of three to the corner – of timber posts. These are visible to the interior of the balcony where they intersect the later infill glazing. To Kelly Street, the front ground floor window and the surrounding wall (nearest Liverpool Street) are part of a Federation addition. The join in the brickwork is clearly evident, and there is a step in the rendered plinth. Two windows have bracketed sun hoods, with shingle roofs. The arches of the windows are without keystones, but the door and blind door have accentuated keystones. The first floor on this side has three evenly spaced windows with similarly treated heads. This area is defined with a faux palisade fence on a new brick base. A path leads to the "side" doorway. The blind door beside the side door would lead to the main chamber. The brickwork is executed in garden wall bond. The three windows upstairs include a blind window (at the upstairs landing). It would seem that this approach was to assist with a symmetrical composition, as a further blind window has been used in the design on the ground floor. Windows have wide sills, supported by brackets as seen in the post office buildings at Muswellbrook and Maitland. The roof to the main building is a double hipped form with brick chimneys and rendered caps without pots.

The main post office space (ground floor) has, in more recent times, been refitted in the standard Australia Post retail format with two counters. Within this space, nibs and piers indicate an earlier arrangement of walls, since removed. The window heads are visible above the display, and a fireplace has been obscured by a plasterboard partition. The sorting room also includes a rear office, postal box sorting area and store rooms. There are timber framed glass highlights facing the south. All internal joinery is painted. A former large opening, with panelled reveals, has been reduced with a plasterboard partition. The interior to the Kelly Street elevation consists of a stair hall, a former dining room, former telegraph room and a service area. The staircase is timber, with square newel posts and turned balusters. The upper floor (former residence/quarters) comprises the stair landing, and four rooms, two of which open to the now enclosed verandah to Liverpool Street. All timber joinery has been painted over. A subsequent single storey addition to Liverpool Street adjoins the main entrance and is setback from the main building line, thus further emphasising the entrance bay. Its design is sympathetic to the Federation era additions. It has a three bay casement window, and a hipped, corrugated steel roof. It contains a locker room, lunch room, male toilet, retail store and a small sorting room.

The kitchen wing adjoins the main building to the rear and has a hipped corrugated steel roof. The three windows of the kitchen wing have tuck pointed arches, as do those to the rear elevation, and the double hung sashes have vertical glazing bars. A ledged door, with its original rimlock and slate threshold leads to an airlock outside the kitchen. The airlock has painted brick walls with cut-andstruck joints, indicating that it was once an external door, and that the kitchen wing was built subsequent to the main building. The fireplace is extant but infilled with cabinetry and retains its timber mantle. A bathroom and laundry adjoin the kitchen.

The rear yard is paved with concrete, and there is a concrete block storage building. The private garden is separated by a paling fence and steel gate leading to a steel "kit-form" carport.

=== Key areas/elements ===
- Prominent corner siting
- Intact external elements including face brick treatment, arched windows, render and tuck
- pointing details

=== Condition ===
The overall condition and intactness of the Scone Post Office is fair, given that the Federation later alterations can be regarded as additions.

=== Original fabric ===
- Structural frame: Concrete footings and floors. Brick external walls. Internal walls timber stud framed and plasterboard clad. Timber-framed roof. Windows are generally timber framed.
- External walls: face brick with stucco dressed arch trim and other detailing. Enclosed upper verandah, with brick side walling and front timber framed and fitted with awning sash windows.
- Internal walls: Original plastered brick, with new stud timber framing with painted plasterboard cladding.
- Floor: concrete and timber. Carpeted in retail and rear office areas, vinyl tiling in lunch room and storage areas; ceramic tiles in wet areas.
- Ceiling: suspended to rear store room aluminium grid framed, inset with acoustic panels.
- Roof: Timber-framed and clad with corrugated galvanised iron.

=== Summary of development and/or alteration ===
Original two storey building (1879); single storey kitchen wing along Kelly Street added later; and early twentieth century additions (1908 and 1914) including single storey addition on corner, with open balcony. Roof built over balcony; small extension along Liverpool Street; and then a subsequent large extension possibly contemporary with infill to balcony, along Liverpool Street (c. 1960). Balcony enclosed.

== Heritage listing ==
Scone Post Office is of historical and social significance. The building has been an important public and postal building for over 130 years. Typologically, Scone Post Office is a hybrid comprising a James Barnet's central Victorian building design with Walter Vernon's substantial Federation additions. It contributes to the historic and predominantly nineteenth century streetscapes and heritage character of this part of the Central Scone Conservation Area.

Significant elements of Scone Post Office include the 1879 two-storey building component, including the original quarters entered from Kelly Street, and the single-storey wing on Kelly Street; and the additions of 1908 and 1914. The long single-storey 1960s post office box wing to the Liverpool Street frontage is a lesser element.

Scone Post Office was listed on the Australian Commonwealth Heritage List on 22 August 2012 having satisfied the following criteria.

Criterion A: Processes

Scone Post Office, of 1879 with later additions, and originally designed by New South Wales Colonial Architect James Barnet, is of historical significance. The building has been an important public and postal building for over 130 years, in the centre of the historic town of Scone. It followed the earlier telegraph office of 1877, which in turn was established in response to Scone's development from its original settlement in the early nineteenth century. While altered and extended, the 1870s building component, including quarters, remains clearly evident and prominent. This, together with the overall scale of the post office and its corner location, enhance this aspect of significance.

Criterion D: Characteristic values

Scone Post Office is an example of:

- Post office and telegraph office with quarters (second generation typology 1870–1929)
- Victorian Italianate style with substantial Federation additions
- the work of the New South Wales Colonial Architect's office (James Barnet), the New South Wales Government Architect's office (Walter Vernon) and the Commonwealth Department of Works and Railways office (George Oakeshott / E Henderson).

Typologically, the Scone Post Office is considered to be a second generation post office, originally designed with a post and telegraph office and quarters. The building underwent alteration during the Federation period with a substantial addition to the Liverpool Street façade. More broadly, as a composite building, the typological intactness has been compromised, although the earlier 1870s component remains discernible. The first floor also retains fabric and planning associated with its original residential use.

Stylistically and architecturally, Scone Post Office is a hybrid comprising a central Victorian building with substantial Federation additions, the latter generally being sympathetically designed and integrated into the Victorian building although they have to a degree compromised the external presentation and intactness of the original building. Notwithstanding this, the post office's 1870s fabric, form and architectural detailing, including that which is concentrated in the main square-plan, double-storey, hipped roofed building remains readable and evident. Some of these details are also of interest, including the header arches over the windows, which are an unusual touch of high Victorian vigour in the New South Wales context.

Criterion E: Aesthetic characteristics

Scone Post Office is a substantial and prominently located historic post office, which contributes to the heritage character of the historic and predominantly nineteenth century streetscapes in this part of the Central Scone Conservation Area. The corner siting facilitates generous views of the property; the architectural detailing of the 1870s component is also of aesthetic value.

Criterion G: Social value

Scone Post Office has been the focus of local postal communication services for over 130 years. Its prominent location, valued heritage character, and role as a recognisable historic public building in the collection of valued nineteenth century buildings in Central Scone, enhance its social value.
