= Scone Civic Theatre =

Heritage-listed cinema in Scone, New South Wales, Australia

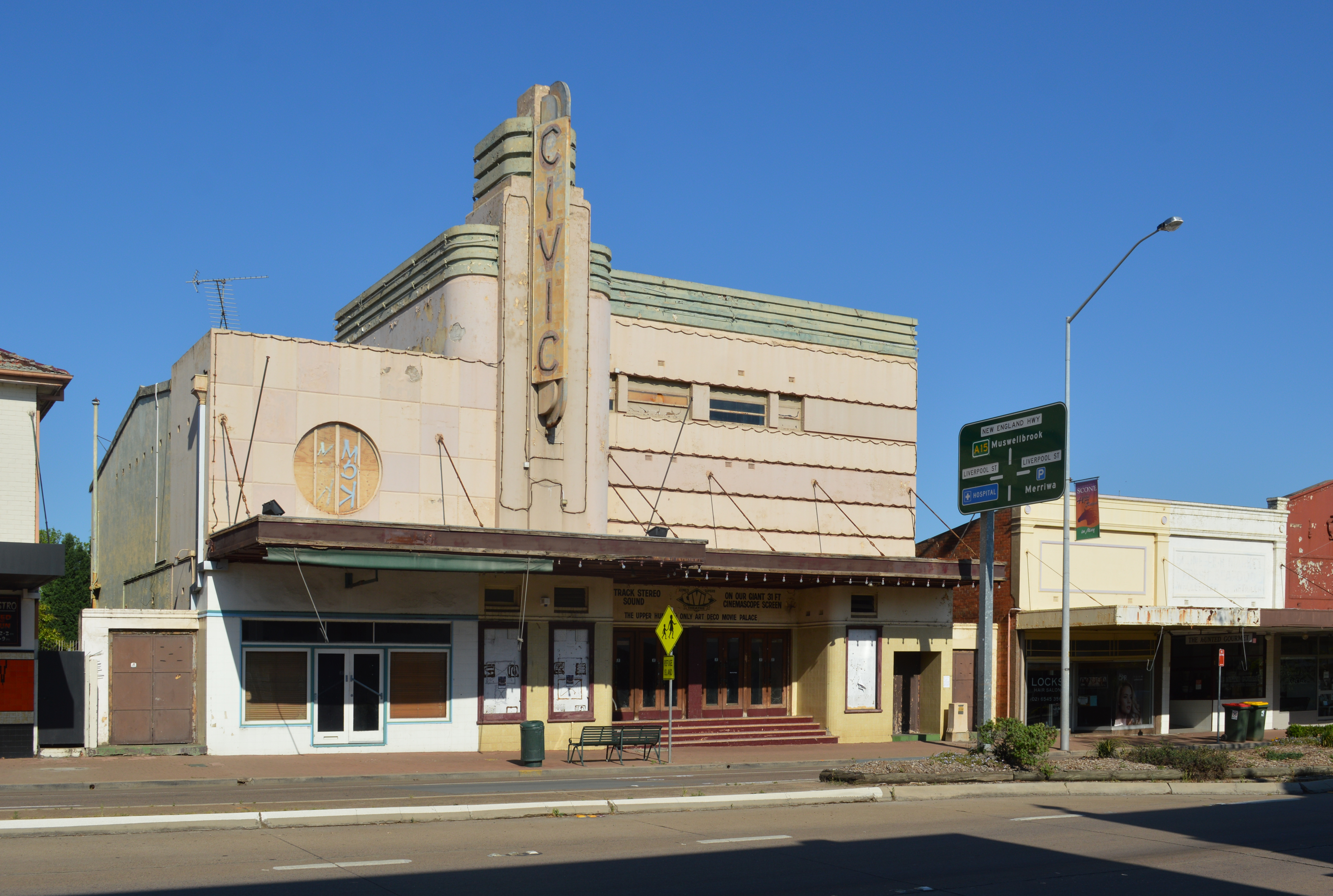
- Scone Civic Theatre, in 2015

- Location within New South Wales Location within Australia
- 32°02′58″S 150°52′06″E
- Location: 144 Kelly Street, Scone, Upper Hunter Shire, New South Wales, Australia

History
- Built: 1937–1938
- Built for: Scone Theatres Pty Ltd

Site notes
- Architect(s): Guy Crick and Bruce Furse
- Owner: Fivedale Pty Ltd

New South Wales Heritage Register
- Official name: Scone Civic Theatre
- Type: State heritage (built)
- Designated: 21 February 2003
- Reference no.: 1660
- Type: Cinema
- Category: Recreation and Entertainment
- Builders: Mr A. F. Little

The Scone Civic Theatre is a heritage-listed cinema at 144 Kelly Street, Scone, Upper Hunter Shire, New South Wales, Australia. It was designed by Guy Crick and Bruce Furse and built from 1937 to 1938 by Mr A. F. Little. The property is privately owned. It was added to the New South Wales State Heritage Register on 21 February 2003.

== History ==
=== Foundation ===
The Scone Civic Theatre was designed by Guy Crick and Bruce W. Furse, architects, Sydney, in 1937 for the Scone Theatres Pty Ltd. The original design by Crick & Furse was an 899-seat cinema. However, this was scrapped and the cinema redesigned after the company was unable to procure the original site on Kelly Street that they wanted, An amended scheme was submitted in November 1937 by Crick and Furse for license approval under the Public Halls and Cinemas Act of 1908.

The theatre was designed to seat 583 in the stalls and 246 in the circle, but was scaled back to seat 568 in the stalls and 240 in the dress circle, making the total seating capacity of 808. The tender of Mr. A. F. Little was accepted in November 1937, and building commenced in December. By February 1938, the foundations had been laid and the brickwork of the outside walls commenced. By 18 July 1938 the cinema was virtually complete, with just the seats to be put into position, just in time for the official opening of the cinema.

The building cost approximately A£14,000 to erect. The building contractor was Mr A. F. Little of Sydney. Mr H. Knight of Annandale did the painting and decorating and the electrician was Mr. G. H. Marshall, of Scone. The fibrous plasterers were Messrs. Rich and Co., Newcastle; vestibule and floor tiling; Roof and Building Service, Sydney; carpets, Mr A. Frederick Gibbs, and curtains, Mr G. Brakell. Sound equipment was supplied by RCA; bio machines, National Theatre Supplies; seating, Owen Knox and Co; heating and ventilating, Unit Air Conditioners, Sydney; doors, and also the complete fittings of the milk bar, Mr J. Hill, Scone.

The Civic Theatre was proclaimed and gazetted on 17 June 1938, and its licence issued on 17 August 1938.

The Civic Theatre was leased to Mr. C. R. N. Owen, and the Gala Opening was on 27 July 1938. The opening night was a charity function, with proceeds in aid of the Scott Memorial Hospital, in Scone. The Mayor of Scone, Ald. W. J. O'Brien, officiated at the event, after H. C. Carter, the Member for Liverpool Plains, couldn't attend due to illness. There were two films on the program Stolen Heaven and A Bride for Henry – which were supplemented by shorts.

Scone Theatres Pty Ltd was formed in 1937 to construct the cinema. The directors of the company and its shareholders were farmers and residents from the district. Chairman of the company, A. C. Ingham, explained at the opening night, "the theatre...had been built by the citizens of the town and district, by whom the whole of the requisite capital had been subscribed". The company had shown its determination to cater for the entertainment of the people, and looked forward to a continuance of their patronage, which was so much appreciated in the evening. The Scone Advocate praised the company for their "boldness and faith and confidence in the town and district." The directors of the company in 1937 were Arthur Centennial Inham, a grazier from Parklands; Herbett Ernest Ell Garside, a store keeper in Scone; and the alternate director was Maxwell Osmond Pye, a medical practitioner in based in Scone.

The Civic Theatre was seen as a sign of progress and enterprise for Scone, "imposing and resplendent to a degree", "an ornament to the district, of which it will also remain one of the architectural features for many years to come". The Scone Advocate reported the theatre opened "in a blaze of splendour and colour". The design and fittings of the cinema were admired for being modern, efficient and comfortable." In the magnificent building, seating accommodation has been provided for approximately 1000 persons in stalls and circle (a slight exaggeration, as the cinema actually seated 808), while spacious foyer room and vestibules have been incorporated in the scheme. The auditorium has been portioned and designed so as to permit of the maximum acoustic properties being obtained, and is ornamented by a restrained application of features that blend with the artistic ceiling to give full effect to the colour combination provided by the Neon and concealed lighting, the mellowness, yet sufficiently colourfulness, of which is most effective."

In particular, the theatre's air-conditioning was celebrated as a modem innovation. The Civic Theatre, as the newspaper was quick to point out, was amongst the first cinemas in the state to have full air-conditioning. The design, plans and specifications for the air-conditioning are deposited at NSW State Records in the file for Scone Civic Theatre – Licence No; 554.

=== 1950s ===
On 22 September 1954, just before 5:00 pm, a fire broke out in the Civic Theatre. Theatre employees discovered the fire when they returned to the cinema to prepare for the evening programme. Scone Volunteer Fire Brigade was called to the cinema to put out the blaze, which had originated in the pit below the stage. It was unclear how the fire started, it being blamed on children smoking tobacco in the pit under the stage. Damage to the theatre was contained around the stage section of the auditorium. The stage, screen, curtains, sound equipment, ceiling and roof were severely damaged by fire, with the remainder of the building's contents being slightly damaged by heat, smoke and water. The Northern Daily Leader reported that the fire caused an estimated £5,000 damage to the theatre. After cleaning up and making a temporary canvass sheet roof, the Civic Theatre re-opened to patrons two days later on the Friday.

The lessee, Mr Theo Coroneo, took the opportunity to renovate the cinema while building new fittings following the fire, By December 1954 the roof and ceiling had been repaired, and the stage was in the course of reconstruction. The Theatre was also renovated and painted. Alterations were made to the observation ports in the bio-box and new apparatus was provided. Cream brocade curtains and a new wide screen were installed in February 1955.

The Scone Civic Theatre hosted the Australian premiere of the 1957 film The Shiralee. The film starred Peter Finch and was filmed in the Scone district.

In June 1957 an engine room to house an auxiliary electricity generating plant was constructed at the rear southern side of the cinema. It was constructed of concrete foundations and floor with timber frame and galvanised corrugated iron sheet walls and roof.

As noted above, the original lessee of the Civic Theatre from Scone Theatre Pty Ltd was C. R. N. Owen. According to The Scone Advocate, Mr Owen, had 'quite a chain of theatres in the country districts of the State". In the early days of the theatre, the local manager was Mr Ron Sutton, who had previously worked with Mr Owen at one of his enterprises down at Nowra. In 1944, Alex Coroneo was listed as the exhibitor at the Civic Theatre. The lease was then taken over by Theo Mena Coroneo and Sam Coroneo, and together the brothers ran the theatre until 1953, after which time Theo Mena Coroneo took over the licence and lease for himself. In May 1963 Theo Mena Coroneo purchased the Civic Theatre from Scone Theatres Pty Ltd, and as a consequence the company was wound up. The Civic Theatre has remained in the hands of the Coroneo family since 1963.

=== Closure ===
According to Ross Thorne et al., the Civic Theatre "closed around 1983-84, but reopened in 1988 after minor renovations. It closed again in 1992, but reopened the same year."

In 2018, the facade of the building was restored as part of an ongoing restoration effort aimed at reopening the building as a multifunction centre.

== Development of cinema theatres in Australia ==
Guy Crick (1901–1964) was born in Hobart and was educated in Melbourne. He attended the Technical College in Melbourne part-time for four years, then returned to Hobart in the early 1920s where he subsequently married. In the middle of the decade he moved to Sydney and managed to gain employment in the office of Henry Eli White, one of the most prolific and influential cinema and theatre designers in Australia during the 1920s. Here he would have become familiar with the Union Theatres (later Greater Union) and established a relationship with the company that enabled him to design cinemas for it up until the early 1960s. White closed his office at the onset of the Great Depression and so Crick went into partnership with the cinema specialist architect Charles Bohringer (Bohringer Taylor and Crick) in 1930. This was relatively short lived, Crick leaving the firm to form Crick & Associated. One of these was Bruce W. Furse, who had also worked in the Bohringer office.

Bruce Furse (1906–1967) was born in Strathfield, Sydney, and completed his architectural education at the Sydney Technical College. It is not known who Furse worked for as a young man, but he did not complete the course at the Technical College, instead qualifying to practice as an architect in 1933 after sitting for the Board of Architects of NSW examination.

The firm of Crick and Furse reputedly designed thirty new cinema buildings in New South Wales, Queensland, South Australia and Tasmania, and remodelled about fifty existing cinemas. Crick was influenced by German Expressionist architecture and interested in the interior design of cinemas, that is the furnishings, acoustics, and lighting, while Furse provided the basic lines of decoration and lighting.

After the partnership split up in 1940 Furse went into practice by himself. He carried out wawar-relatedesign and supervision, then after WWII established a practice known as Bruce. W. Furse & Associates. An accident in 1954 resulted in his early retirement from professional life. Crick also continued to practice, keeping his office open while serving in New Guinea during the war. After the war he went into partnership with Servas Van Breda, then practiced as Guy Crick & Associates and finally formed the partnership of Guy Crick, Lewis and Williams. He practiced in Brisbane and in Sydney.

According to Ross Thorne, the Minerva/Metro and West Olympia in Adelaide - both designed by Crick & Furse – were the two finest "Moderne" style theatres in Australia. Thorne, along with Kevin Cork, wrote of Crick & Furse "their influence on cinema building in Australia is immeasurable. The theatres they created represented all that was considered to be modern and comfortable.".

After years of research, plans, reports and meeting approvals, stage one conservation works began in February 2017 – restoration of its exterior. A $40,000 grant from the Office of Environment & Heritage in 2016 contributed four per cent of the overall cost of the initial phase. Stage 2 will be ground floor internal refurbishment, to make it available for use as a community multifunction centre with concealed modern conveniences.

== Description ==
The Civic Theatre at Scone is a medium-sized cinema designed in the Inter-war Functionalist & Moderne style. The building is rendered brick with a fibrolite (corrugated asbestos sheet) roof. Ornament of the building is concentrated on the upper part of the building. The cinema features a stepped skyline on which the cinema's name – Civic – was promoted vertically in stylised lettering. A parallel line motif defines the top of the parapet and the buildings length giving a streamlined effect, and a large circular window dominates the left-hand side of the building, providing light to the crush lounge. The premises consists of the cinema auditorium and one retail shop (originally a milk bar).

Specifications of the cinema were described in the original licence as follows: The building is erected on reinforced concrete foundations, the walls are brick, and the roof construction wood. The roof will be covered with iron. The circle is supported by R. S. J. radials, the general construction being wood. The stairways are carried out in concrete. The height of the ceiling from the floor line is 7.0 metres (23 ft). The overall size of the premises is 20 by 38 metres (64 ft × 126 ft). The width of the auditorium is 14 metres (45 ft) and the depth 25 metres (82 ft). The stage is 2.7 metres (9 ft) in depth by 9.1 metres (30 ft) in width. The depth of the gallery is 15 metres (48 ft). A foyer lounge is located above the shop. The foyer lounge is 16 ft x 34 ft. The biograph room is situated at the rear of the circle. The ventilating machine is towards the rear of the premises and will be independently roofed. The cinema was to be heated and air-conditioned, one of the earliest cinemas to receive such treatment.

The interiors of the foyer, crush lounge and cinema auditorium are highly intact. Entrance to the foyer is via timber framed and glassed double doors with chrome handles. The glass is etched with Art Deco decorative elements and the letter "C". The foyer consists of a ticket booth and candy bar. The ticket booth is situated between the two sets of doors leading to the auditorium. It features metal frame detailing, including a geometric circular pattern, which is repeated in the stair balustrade leading to the crush lounge, and the stairs from the crush lounge to gallery level of the auditorium. The candy bar appears to be a later addition to the foyer. Near the stairs leading to the crush lounge are four Art Deco chairs and a cigarette table. While these may not be original, they contribute significantly to the Art Deco feel of the foyer interior. The crush lounge, which leads from the gallery level of the auditorium is a rectangular room, with a large circular window overlooking Kelly Street. It appears there was originally a bar/candy lounge in this space, however this has since been removed. An old fridge, with a painted logo of the cinema on the side remains. There are doors leading from the men's and women's toilets at the far end of the crush lounge. There are a range of original Art Deco light fittings in the foyer, crush lounge and auditorium. However, there are two chandeliers - one in the foyer and one in the crush lounge - which do not appear to be the original and may have been introduced at a later date.

The auditorium is a two level cinema, originally seating 808 people - 568 in the stalls and 240 in the dress circle. The seating in the stalls have been replaced, however there is still original seating in the gallery. The auditorium curves inwards towards the screen and stage, drawing the viewers eyes to the screen. All the original wall decoration remains intact. Of particular note are the abstract Expressionist geometric motifs that extend from the floor to the ceiling along the length of the auditorium. These streamlined geometric patterns are typical of the work of Crick and Furse.

The biograph room, at the rear of the circle, has two Simplex 35-millimetre (1.4 in) projectors with Peerless Magnarc carbonarc lamp houses dating from c. 1938. The room also contains the original rectifier. The original air-conditioning plant is located on the external northern wall. This has since been replaced by modern air-conditioning.

=== Condition ===
As at 6 January 2003, the building was of solid construction but was in need of substantial renovation, especially exterior and interior painting.

The Functionalist interiors overlaid with Art Deco detail remain substantially unaltered, since the theatre has never been remodelled.

=== Modifications and dates ===
- 22 September 1954 – Fire underneath stage severely damaging stage, screen, curtains, sound equipment, ceiling and roof.
- December 1954 – roof and ceiling had been repaired and stage was in the course of reconstruction. Theatre was also renovated and painted. Alterations made to the observation ports in the bio-box and new apparatus provided.
- February 1955 – cream brocade curtains and a new wide screen installed.
- 10 June 1957 – construction of engine room to house an auxiliary electricity generating plant.
- n.d. – New air-conditioning installed and new vents put into theatre.
- 1988 – minor renovations took place.

== Heritage listing ==
As at 14 March 2007, the Scone Civic Theatre was of State significance as the last remaining intact theatre designed by prominent theatre architects, Crick and Furse in New South Wales. Designed in 1937 and completed in 1938, the Scone Civic Theatre is a representative example of the work of the nationally important cinema architects, Crick and Furse. The Kelly Street façade is an exceptional example of the interwar Functionalist style of architecture in New South Wales, and forms an important part of the streetscape.

The Functionalist interiors (overlaid in Art Deco detail) - the auditorium and foyers remain substantially unaltered, since the theatre has never been remodelled. The intact interiors means there is a high level of research and technical significance. It is one of the few cinemas remaining in New South Wales to retain its dress circle, and has not been converted into multiple cinemas. The interiors provide an important understanding of style and detailing of picture theatre architecture in the 1930s.

The two projectors are original and date from c. 1938. These are of immense technical interest, may warrant further research. The original air-conditioning plant remains largely intact and has technical interest as an early example of full air-conditioning dating from 1938.

The Scone Civic Theatre was built for local public use by the local community therefore has a high level of social significance. Scone Theatres Pty Ltd, a company formed by residents of the district who financed the venture. The Civic Theatre has been a central part of the social and cultural life of the community in Scone and surrounding districts for over 60 years. One of the highlights of the cinema's history is that the Scone Civic Theatre hosted the Australian premiere of the Australian film "The Shiralee' in 1957.

The Scone Civic Theatre was listed on the New South Wales State Heritage Register on 21 February 2003 having satisfied the following criteria.

The place is important in demonstrating the course, or pattern, of cultural or natural history in New South Wales.

The Scone Civic Theatre is historically significant as the last remaining intact theatre designed by prominent cinema architects, Crick and Furse in NSW.

The place has a strong or special association with a person, or group of persons, of importance of cultural or natural history of New South Wales's history.

The Scone Theatre has strong associations with prominent cinema architects, Guy Crick and Bruce. W. Furse – prominent and important cinema architects in NSW during the 1930s.

The place is important in demonstrating aesthetic characteristics and/or a high degree of creative or technical achievement in New South Wales.

The original air-conditioning plant has technical significance as an intact example of an early 20th century full air-conditioning system.

The place has strong or special association with a particular community or cultural group in New South Wales for social, cultural or spiritual reasons.

The Scone Civic Theatre is culturally significant as it hosted the Australian premiere of the Australian film, "The Shiralee" filmed in and around Scone. This was an important cultural event in the growth and recognition of Australian film and of the Australian film industry.

The Scone Civic Theatre is socially significant at a local level.

The place has potential to yield information that will contribute to an understanding of the cultural or natural history of New South Wales.

The largely intact interior provides an important understanding of style and detailing of picture theatre architecture in the 1930s.

The place possesses uncommon, rare or endangered aspects of the cultural or natural history of New South Wales.

The Scone Civic Theatre is rare as the last remaining intact theatre designed by cinema architects, Crick & Furse.

The place is important in demonstrating the principal characteristics of a class of cultural or natural places/environments in New South Wales.

The Scone Civic Theatre is representative of the work of the nationally important cinema architects, Crick and Furse.

== See also ==
- Australian non-residential architectural styles
