= Scone School of Arts =

The Scone School of Arts was a Mechanics' Institute that provided adult education in the town of Scone, New South Wales, Australia in the late 19th and early 20th century. The School, founded in 1868, occupied two heritage listed buildings in Scone – the first from 1873 to 1917, the second from 1924 until the School's closure in 1954.

== History ==
The origins of the School of Arts can be traced back to the 1841 establishment of a reading society, The Scone Book Society, one of the first educational groups to be established in New South Wales. In 1854, funds were raised to establish the Scone Mutual Instruction Class and Juvenile Library; efforts to establish adult education followed, leading to the formation of a 40-strong Mutual Improvement Association and a reading room in 1868. This was reconstituted as Scone School of Arts in the same year so that it might be eligible for government grants to construct its own building. In February 1869, it had appointed a librarian and purchased books, had 70 members, and was holding regular monthly meetings. In 1868, Bertrand Gordon, third son of Charles Gordon, 10th Marquess of Huntly was elected to the School's committee; at a debate on whether the discovery of gold had been beneficial to Australia, he argued in favour of the motion. In May 1869, The Maitland Mercury and Hunter River General Advertiser reported on entertainments as part of fund-raising by the School.

=== First building ===
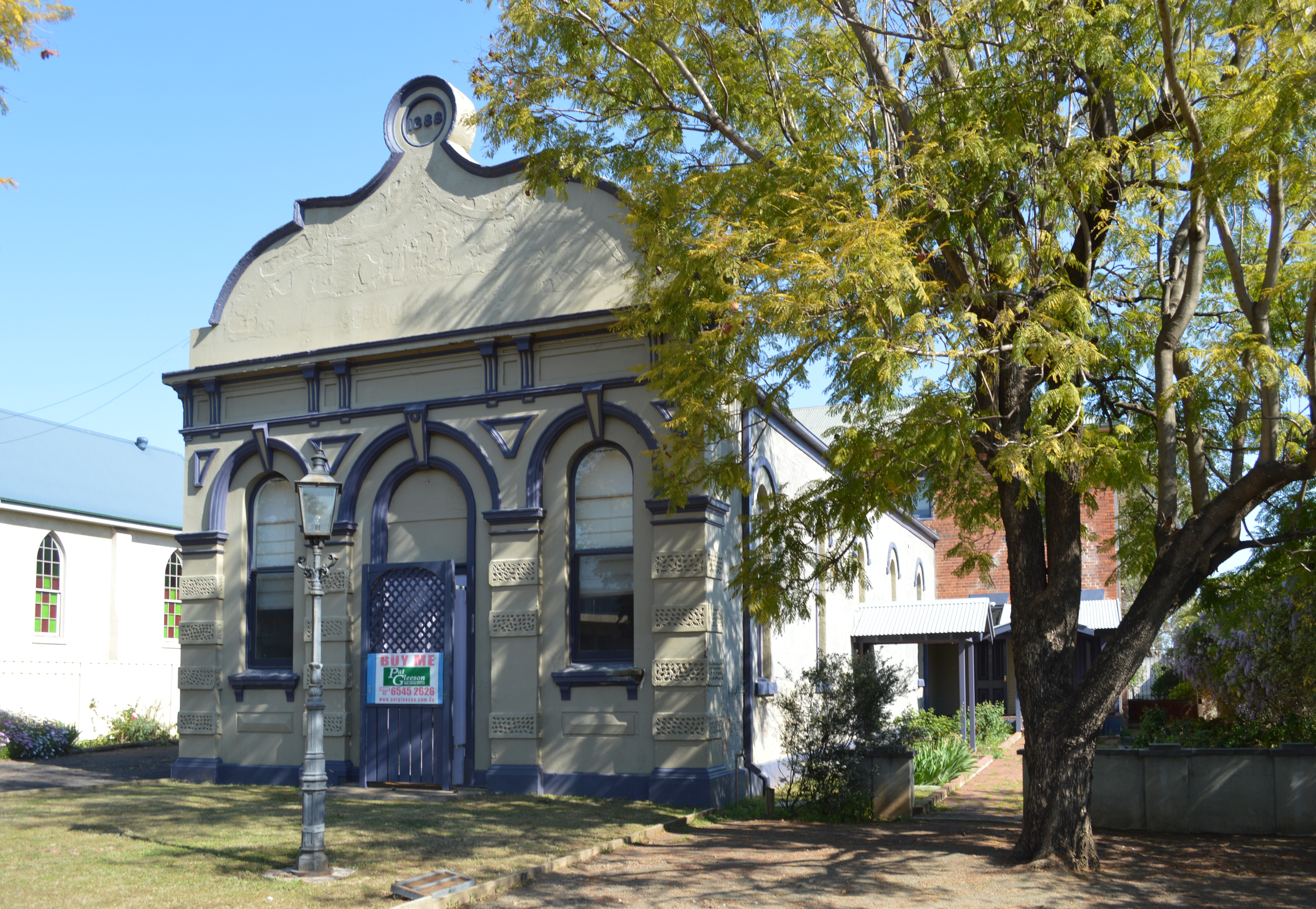
The first Scone School of Arts

In January 1871, the School began to raise funds for a building, for which plans were approved in July 1871. A site (91 Kingdon Street) between the town's Presbyterian church and the railway line, was purchased for £11. The proposed hall measured 50 ft by 25 ft, with a stage and two skillion rooms, and was to be of brick construction with a shingle roof. The 50,000 bricks required for construction were locally produced by a John Newman at £2 per 1000 bricks, and construction began in late 1872. The building officially opened on 9 September 1873. In September 1873, The Maitland Mercury and Hunter River Advertiser described it as having "a handsome stuccoed front, of the Tuscan order ... built of brick on a stone foundation, and is roofed with galvanised iron."

This building, now incorporating the local library, with 1359 books, was later (1887–1889) extended to include a new stage, proscenium, reading room, library, ante-room and porch. It hosted a variety of activities, meetings and events, including lectures. Notable speakers included Mark Twain (on 19 December 1895), who gave a talk on 'morals' which, according to the Scone Advocate, was punctuated with "droll sayings and humour," and Banjo Patterson in 1900.

During the 1890s and 1900s many exhibitions and competitions were held at the school, including needlework, drawing, mapping, writing, spelling bees, elocutionary and music contests. In 1890, it opened a gym (which closed soon after). Membership peaked at 192 in 1906. By July 1908, it started to hold classes including dress-making, cutting and millinery with instructors coming from Sydney Technical College. The School of Arts established drama and musical clubs, and had a billiards table.

It was also used as a drill hall during World War I, having been compulsorily acquired by the Department of Defence for £850 in 1917. The building later reopened as a dance school, a pop-up shop, and as bed and breakfast accommodation, called Willowgate Hall.

=== Second building ===
After the wartime requisition of its first building, the School of Arts eventually located to 214 Kelly Street. It initially purchased land from the Presbyterian Church, but later opted for a new site, for which it paid £330. Its new building, budgeted to cost £1800, was designed by architect Walter Pender and constructed by H Taylor. The Scone branch of the Returned Soldiers' and Sailors' Imperial League of Australia (RSSILA) donated £100 towards the building's cost on condition that they could display an Honour Roll in its lobby and use a room for meetings. Named the Scone Soldiers' Memorial School of Arts, the new building was officially opened on 24 March 1924 and helped the School attract new members, with membership reaching 220. A memorial arch commemorating those who lost their lives in World War I was officially unveiled on 26 August 1924.

During the Great Depression, the school lost government funding, and its reading collection was reduced. An "All Nations Fair" was twice held to raise funds, along with concerts, socials and euchre parties, and in 1933 it hosted exhibition billiards matches by Horace Lindrum. In 1936, the Scone Branch of the Country Women's Association moved their rest rooms to the building, and a baby health clinic opened in 1938. In 1939 work began on installing sewerage to the building and undertaking some renovations.

After World War II, social changes including the passage of Australia's Free Public Library Act began to affect the School's future, and in 1953 the School of Arts Committee proposed to donate the building to Scone Council on condition that it continue to be used as a library; this proposal was accepted by the Council in April 1954. The building was modernised, stocked with new books, and was officially opened on 31 July 1954 by the State Governor, Lieutenant General Sir John Northcott. In 2011, the library was moved to the old Scone Shire Council Chambers, while the former School of Arts building was sold to Transcare, a not-for-profit community organisation providing support and services for local residents.
