= Old Court Theatre, Scone =

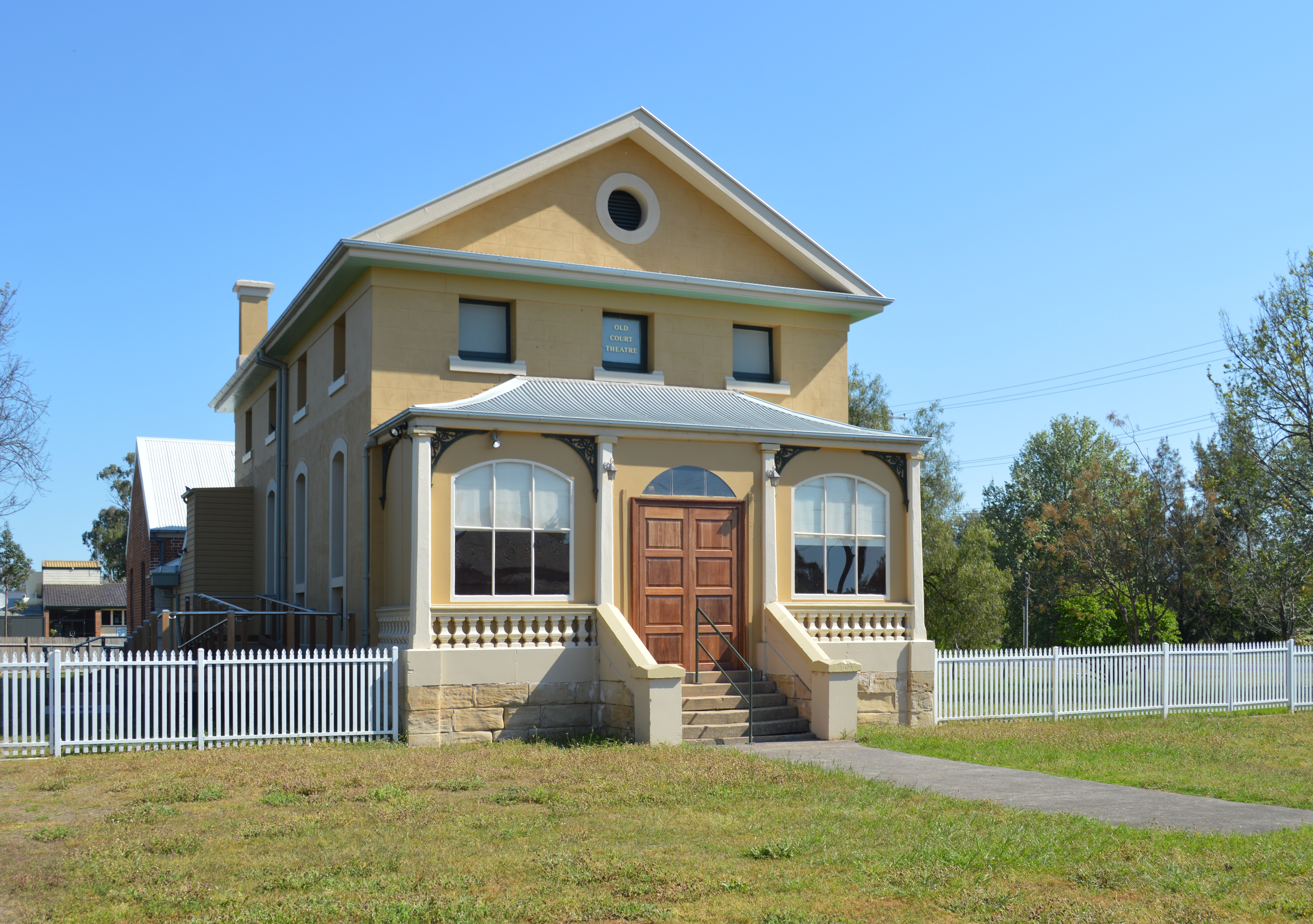
- Old Court Theatre, in 2015

- Location within New South Wales Location within Australia
- 32°03′08″S 150°51′37″E
- Location: 41 Kingdon Road, Scone, Upper Hunter Shire, New South Wales, Australia

History
- Built: c. 1882

Site notes
- Owner: Scone Community Amateur Dramatic Society Inc.

New South Wales Heritage Register
- Official name: Old Court Theatre; Courthouse
- Type: State heritage (built)
- Designated: 2 April 1999
- Reference no.: 340
- Type: Courthouse
- Category: Law Enforcement

The Old Court Theatre is a heritage-listed former courthouse, now serving as community theatre and playhouse located at 41 Kingdon Road, Scone, Upper Hunter Shire, New South Wales, Australia. It is also known as the Old Courthouse. The property is owned by Scone Community Amateur Dramatic Society Inc., and was added to the New South Wales State Heritage Register on 2 April 1999.

== History ==
Built as a courthouse in c. 1882, when the original building ceased operating as a courthouse, it fell into disrepair and was even used at one point to store pesticides for the Prickly Pear Authority. In 2014, the Old Court House received new roof sheeting, gutters, eaves, render, internal and external painting and a disabled ramp through a $127,000 grant from Heritage NSW, $137,000 funding from the Upper Hunter Shire Council and a $10,000 donation from the Hunter Mutual Regional Bank. The building now serves as a multi-purpose function centre for lectures, plays, functions and debates.

== Description ==
The front of the theatre building faces Kingdon Street, with a formal facade, flight of entry steps to the front portico, flanked by twin shrubs of may bush (Spiraea cantonensis). A low picket fence runs either side of the theatre's front along the boundary. To either side of the building is a grassed area with scattered tree plantings. To the left of the front facade is a golden rain tree (Koelreuteria bipinnata) and to the eastern boundary are a number of oleander (Nerium oleander cv.) shrubs and to the right (west) and set back towards the rear of the front building is a Brazilian peppercorn tree (Schinus molle var. areira).

To the Aberdeen Street (western) side of the property, the side of the theatre building, are two rear outbuildings including a single storey brick building close to the theatre and a corrugated iron shed further to the rear of that. Behind (i.e. rear of these are a grove of silky oak (Grevillea robusta) trees as well as the pepper tree noted above.

== Heritage listing ==
The Old Court Theatre was listed on the New South Wales State Heritage Register on 2 April 1999.

== See also ==
- Australian non-residential architectural styles
