= Parkville, New South Wales =

Parkville
- Town
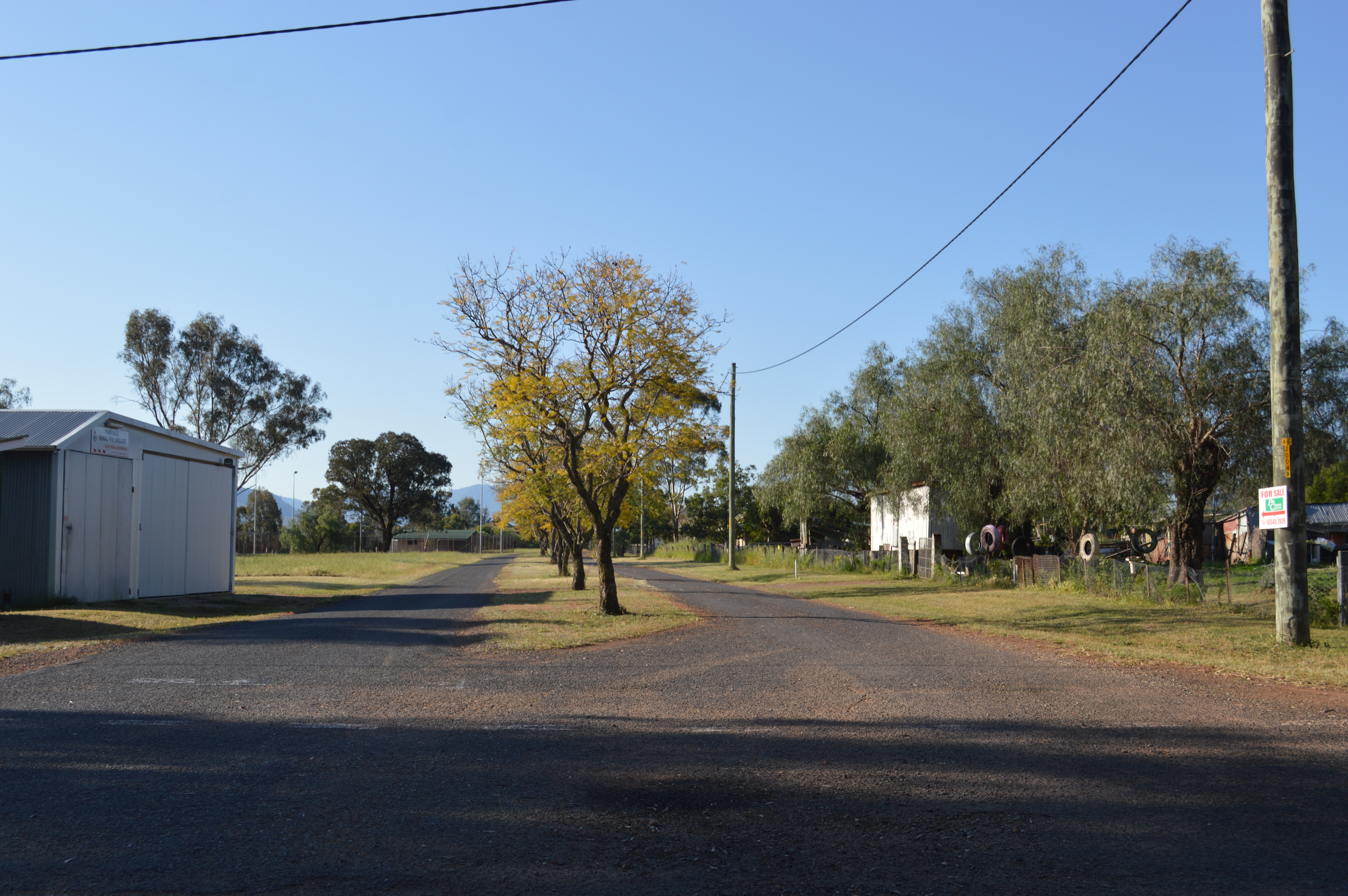
- A street in Parkville. The Rural Fire Service shed is to the left

- Coordinates: 31°58′54″S 150°52′4″E
- Country: Australia
- State: New South Wales
- LGA: Upper Hunter Shire Council

Population
  - Total: 721 (2006 census)
- Postcode: 2337

Parkville is a small township in the Hunter Region of New South Wales, Australia, located on the New England Highway and Main North railway line. At the 2006 census, Parkville had a population of 721 people.

A now closed railway station which opened in 1877 was located there, no trace now remains.

Preceding station	Former services	Following station
Wingen towards Wallangarra	Main Northern Line	Scone towards Sydney
