= Blandford, New South Wales =

Australian village

Blandford
- Town
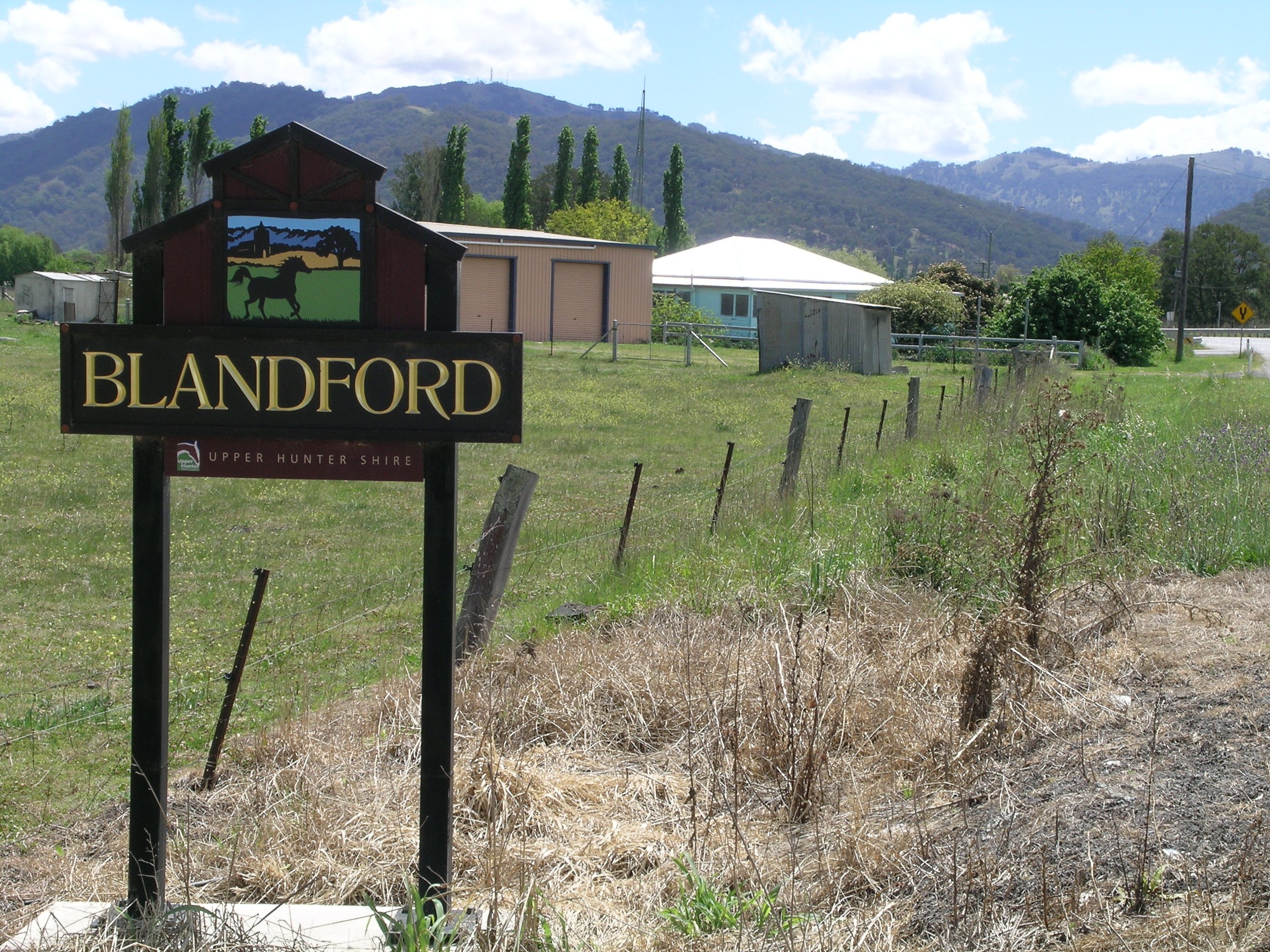
- New England Highway, Blandford, NSW.

- Coordinates: 31°47′S 150°53′E
- Country: Australia
- State: New South Wales
- Region: Hunter Region
- LGA: Upper Hunter Shire
- Location: 307 km (191 mi) NW of Sydney; 35 km (22 mi) N of Scone; 185 km (115 mi) NW of Newcastle; 100 km (62 mi) S of Tamworth

Government
  - State electorate: Upper Hunter
  - Federal division: New England
- Elevation: 421 m (1,381 ft)

Population
  - Total: 183 (2016 census)
- Postcode: 2338
- County: Brisbane
- Parish: Murulla
Localities around Blandford
Ardglen
Murrurundi	Blandford
	Murulla

Blandford is a village in the upper Hunter Region of New South Wales, Australia, located on the New England Highway.

== Population ==
In the 2016 Census, there were 183 people in Blandford. 92.2% of people were born in Australia and 97.2% of people spoke only English at home.

== Transport ==
Blandford railway station opened in 1872 and was located there, but closed in the 1970s with no trace now remaining. However the old station master's house is still occupied and is adjacent to the line.

== Notable people ==
- Hanna Kay, artist
