= Gundy =

- Suburb
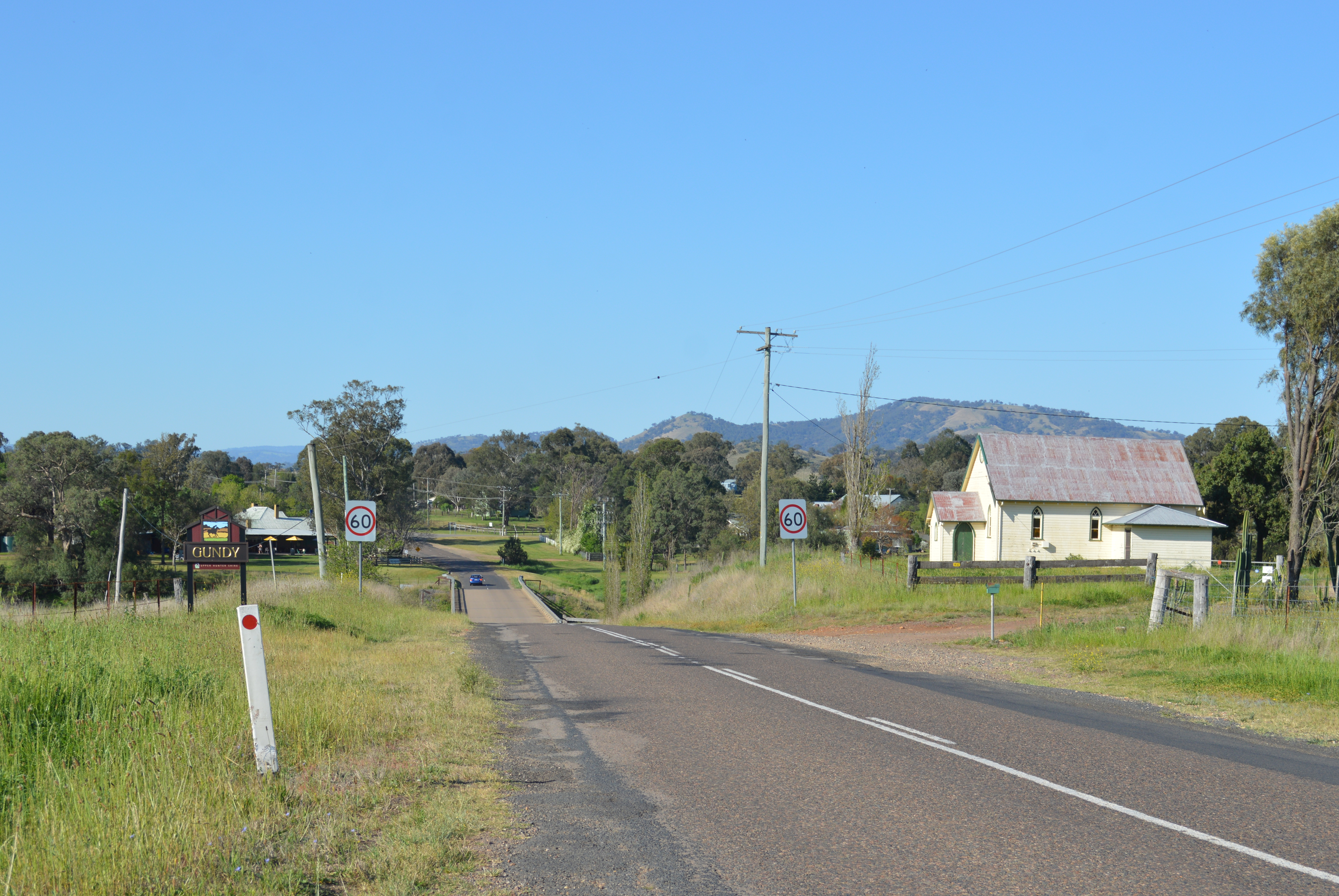
- Entering Gundy over the Pages River bridge.

- Coordinates: 32°0′54″S 151°0′54″E
- Country: Australia
- State: New South Wales
- Region: Hunter
- LGA: Upper Hunter Shire
- Location: 269 km (167 mi) N of Sydney; 165 km (103 mi) NW of Newcastle; 38 km (24 mi) NNE of Muswellbrook; 19 km (12 mi) ENE of Scone

Government
  - State electorate: Upper Hunter
  - Federal division: Hunter

Population
  - Total: 188 (2011 census)
- Time zone: UTC+10 (AEST)
  - Summer (DST): UTC+11 (AEDT)
- Postcode: 2337
- County: Brisbane
- Parish: Alma

Gundy is a locality in the Hunter Valley of New South Wales, Australia. The locality is in the Upper Hunter Shire local government area and on the Pages River, 269 km (167 mi) north of the state capital, Sydney. At the 2011 census, Gundy had a population of 188.

== History ==
European settlement in Gundy started in 1826 with a land grant to John Stewart who surveyed the Upper Hunter River in the early 1800s. The village was originally known as Bellevue, the name of a nearby property. It acquired its current name from a Mrs. Gundy who ran an inn further along the road. The town "initially served as a stopover for teams travelling from Scone to stations located further up the Pages and Isis Rivers".

The discovery of gold nearby saw Gundy develop as a service centre for miners with an inn and church constructed. By 1881 the village had a population of 60 and facilities included a school, post office and stores.

The local pub—the Linga Longa Hotel—and the Gundy General Store are the only retail businesses in the village. The general store faced closure in September 2012 before being bought by new owners. An annual rodeo is held on New Year's Eve.

== Notable residents ==
- Phillip Adams and Patrice Newell
