= Hanna Kay =

Australian artist

Hanna Kay is an Australian artist.

== Early life and education ==
Kay was born in Israel, studied art at the Academy of Fine Arts Vienna, Austria, lived for ten years in New York, and since 1990 has been living in Australia. In 2000 she completed a BA in Semiotics and Philosophy, at the University of Sydney, Australia, and in 2019 was awarded a PhD in Fine Arts by the University of Sydney.

== Career ==
She has exhibited since 1970 in Tel-Aviv, Jerusalem. Munich, Frankfurt, Vienna, Amsterdam, New York, Chicago, San-Francisco, Sydney, Melbourne, Adelaide, Beijing and Tianjin, and her artworks are on permanent display in the San Francisco Museum of Modern Art, National Gallery of Victoria, Muswellbrook Regional Arts Centre, Tamworth Regional Gallery, Maitland Regional Art Gallery, Orange Regional Art Gallery, and the Jewish Museum of Australia in Melbourne. In 2007, Macmillan Art Publishing published Notes from the Shed (ISBN 9781876832582), an illustrated selection from Kay's journal focusing on the creative process. It was launched at the University of Sydney by Phillip Adams in August 2007. Her exhibition "Undertow", which explores Jewish migration to Australia, was commissioned by the Maitland Regional Art Gallery in New South Wales and toured regional art centers and museums for four years starting in 2009 – Tamworth Regional Art Gallery, NSW (2009), Maitland Regional Art Gallery, NSW (2010), the Jewish Museum of Australia, Melbourne, and the Moree Plains Regional Art Gallery, NSW (2010), Stanthorpe Regional Art Gallery, QLD, (2010), Broken Hill Regional Art Gallery, NSW, (2010), Orange Regional Art Gallery, NSW, (2011), and Hervey Bay Regional Art Gallery, Queensland (2012). From 2012, in addition to regularly exhibiting in Sydney, Melbourne and in regional galleries and museums in Australia, she was invited to exhibit in Beijing, China. This led to cultural exchange exhibitions in the Beijing Art Academy 2012 and in Meijiang International Art Gallery, Tianjin China 2014, and an art residence in Zhouzhuang, Shanghai 2019. The earlier visits to China led to a decision to undertake a PhD project in visual arts and philosophy at the University of Sydney. The art component of the project, "Shifting Horizons", is a product of numerous research field trips in China, was part of a touring exhibition in Australia and China.

== Awards ==
- Winner 2007 Muswellbrook Open Art Prize
- Finalist Dobell Prize, Country Energy Landscape Art Prize
- Finalist, The Alice Springs Prize
- Winner 2008 Norvill Art Prize
- Finalist – Country Energy Art Prize and Fleurieu Biennale SA
- Turning the Pages (Original idea and inception)
