= Murulla, New South Wales =

Murulla
- Coordinates: 31°49′54″S 150°55′04″E
- Country: Australia
- State: New South Wales
- LGA: Upper Hunter Shire
- Location: 230 km (140 mi) N of Sydney; 82 km (51 mi) S of Tamworth; 11 km (6.8 mi) SE of Murrurundi

Population
  - Total: 23 (SAL 2021)
- Postcode: 2337

Murulla is a locality in the Hunter Region of New South Wales, Australia, located on the New England Highway and Main North railway line. It is the site of a serious railway accident that killed 26 people on September 13, 1926.
