= Scone railway station =

Railway station in New South Wales, Australia

Scone
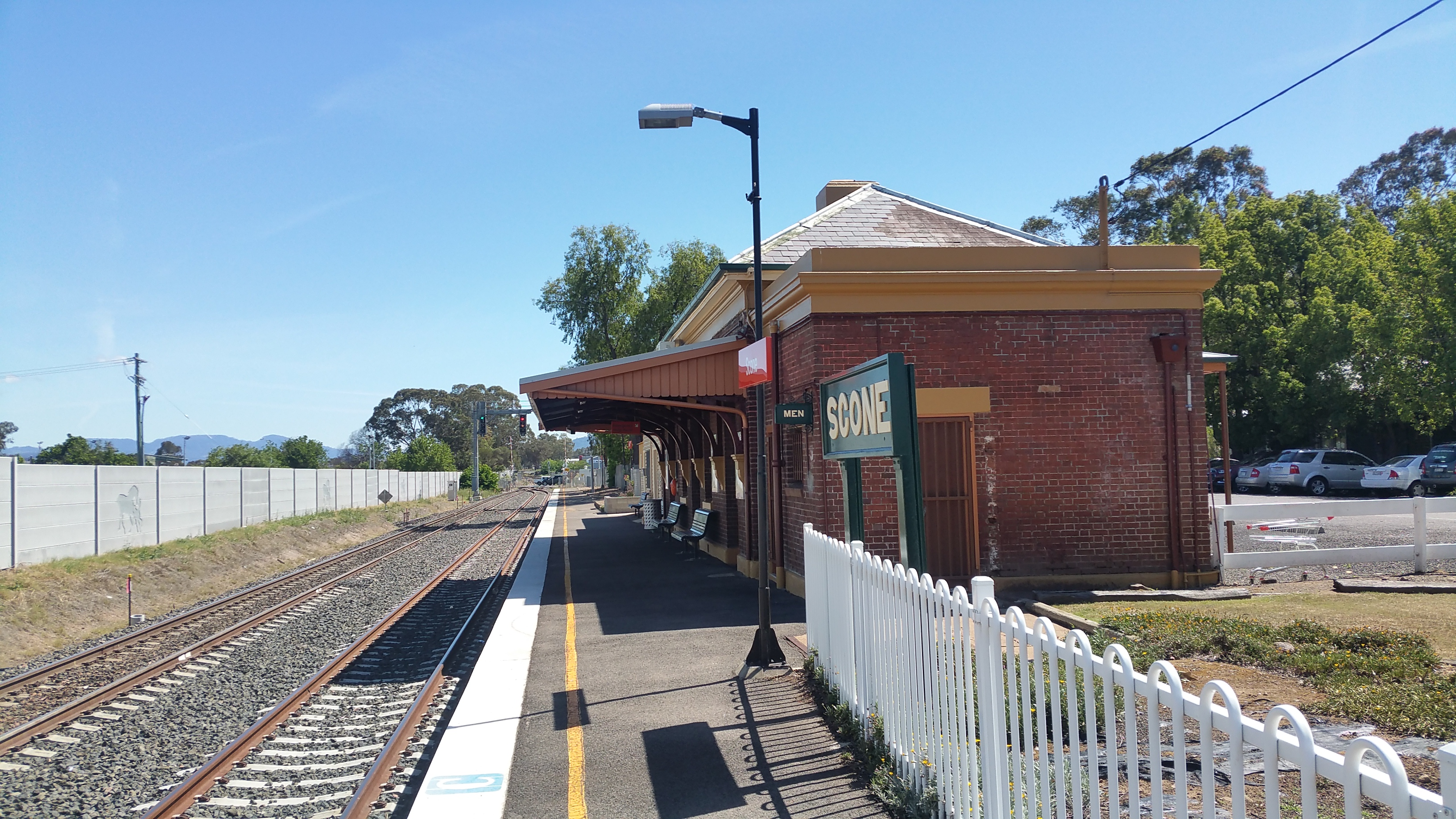
- Northbound view in November 2017

General information
- Location: Susan Street, Scone; Australia
- Coordinates: 32°02′49″S 150°52′01″E
- Owner: Transport Asset Manager of New South Wales
- Operator: Sydney Trains
- Line: Main North
- Distance: 314.66 km (195.52 mi) from Central
- Platforms: 1 (1 side)
- Tracks: 3

Construction
- Structure type: Ground
- Accessible: Yes

Other information
- Station code: NSO
- Website: Transport for NSW

History
- Opened: 17 April 1871 (155 years ago)

Passengers
- 2025: 9,899 (year); 27 (daily) (Sydney Trains, NSW TrainLink)

Services
Preceding station	Intercity Trains	Following station
Terminus	Hunter Line	Aberdeen towards Newcastle Interchange
Preceding station	NSW TrainLink	Following station
Murrurundi towards Moree or Armidale	NSW TrainLink North Western Line	Aberdeen towards Sydney
Former services
Preceding station	Former services	Following station
Parkville towards Wallangarra	Main Northern Line (1877–c.1979)	Aberdeen towards Sydney

New South Wales Heritage Register
- Official name: Scone Railway Station
- Type: State heritage (built)
- Designated: 2 April 1999
- Reference no.: 1242
- Type: Railway Platform / Station
- Category: Transport – Rail
Location

Scone railway station is a heritage-listed railway station located on the Main Northern line in Scone, New South Wales, Australia. The station serves the town of Scone and opened on 17 April 1871. The property was added to the New South Wales State Heritage Register on 2 April 1999.

== Station configuration ==
The station has a single platform and a passing loop. The original John Whitton 1871 brick building remains. In June 2014 the layout was reconfigured with the former loop becoming the main line and the platform line the loop.

The complex includes a type 4^{[note 1]} brick second class station building, erected in 1871; a standard timber skillion roof type 3 signal box; and an outshed. Other structures include a brick platform face, completed in 1871; a jib crane; and a former goods loading facility.

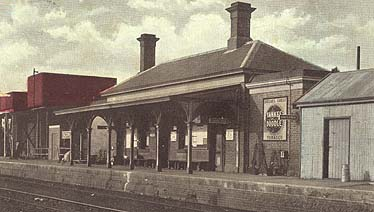
The station c. 1900.

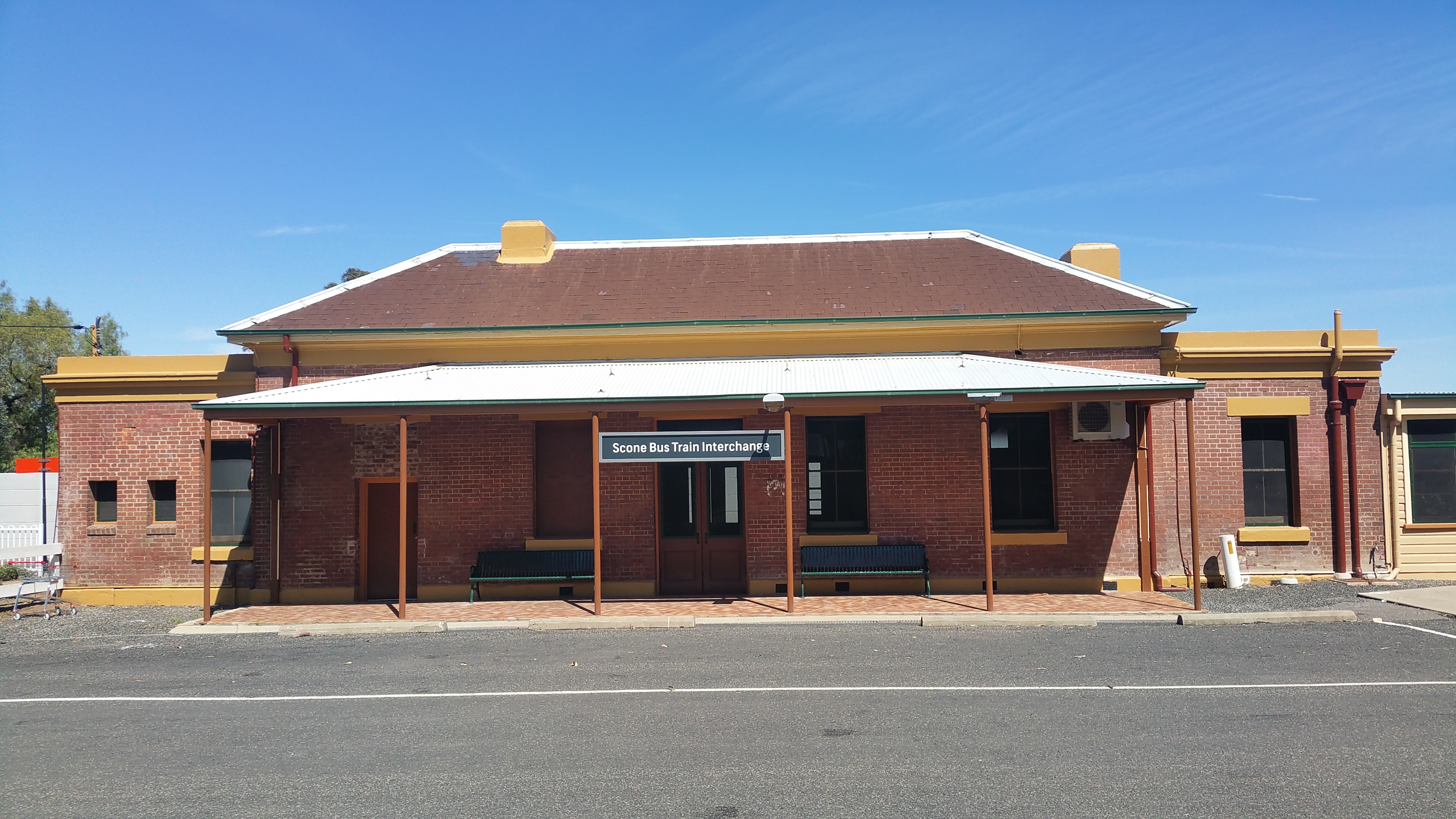
Exterior of station building

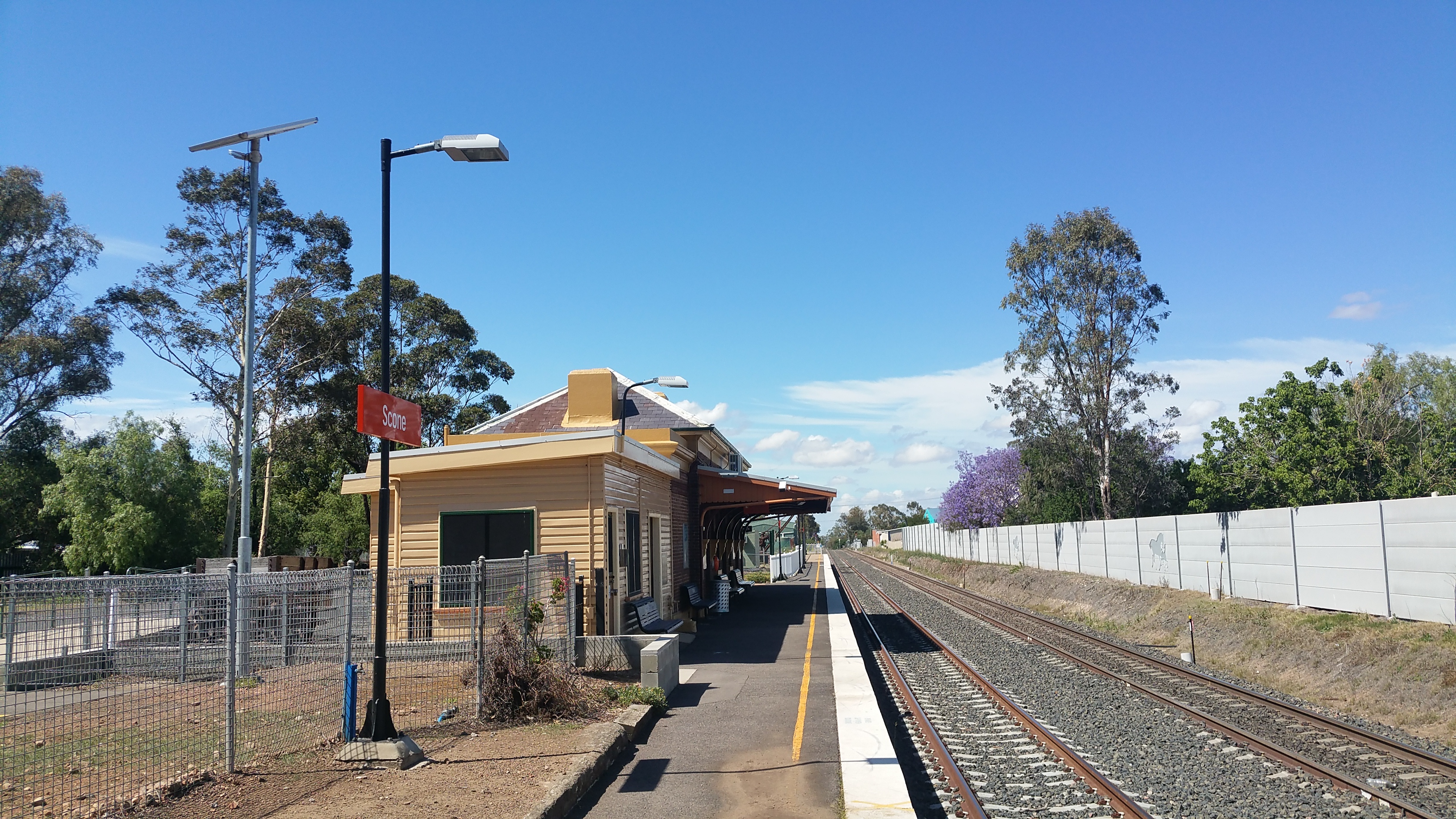
Southbound view on platform

== Platforms and services ==
Scone is the terminating point for Sydney Trains Hunter Line services from Newcastle and a stopping point for NSW TrainLink Xplorer services from Sydney to Armidale and Moree.

The Hunter services were introduced by CityRail in September 1990.

Hunter line services usually terminate at the southern end of the platform which is slightly raised. Xplorers use the full platform.

There are three local services to/from Newcastle on weekdays, with two per day on weekends and public holidays.

Platform	Line	Stopping pattern	Notes
1	HUN	terminating services to & from Newcastle (2–3 per day)	
1	North Western Region	services to Armidale/Moree and Sydney Central	

== Heritage listing ==
Scone station is a fine mid-Victorian station building dating from the opening of the line. The building is well detailed and of fine proportion, it forms part of a group of buildings on that section of the line all that date from the opening of the line and which form a very important group of railway buildings in the state. The building also forms an important civic group in the town and contributes greatly to its character. The station is a focal point of the northern approach to the town.

Scone railway station was listed on the New South Wales State Heritage Register on 2 April 1999 having satisfied the following criteria.

The place possesses uncommon, rare or endangered aspects of the cultural or natural history of New South Wales.

This item is assessed as historically rare. This item is assessed as arch. rare. This item is assessed as socially rare.

== Notes ==
1. RailCorp s170 study reveals this to be type 3.
