= Murrurundi railway station =

Railway station in New South Wales, Australia

Murrurundi
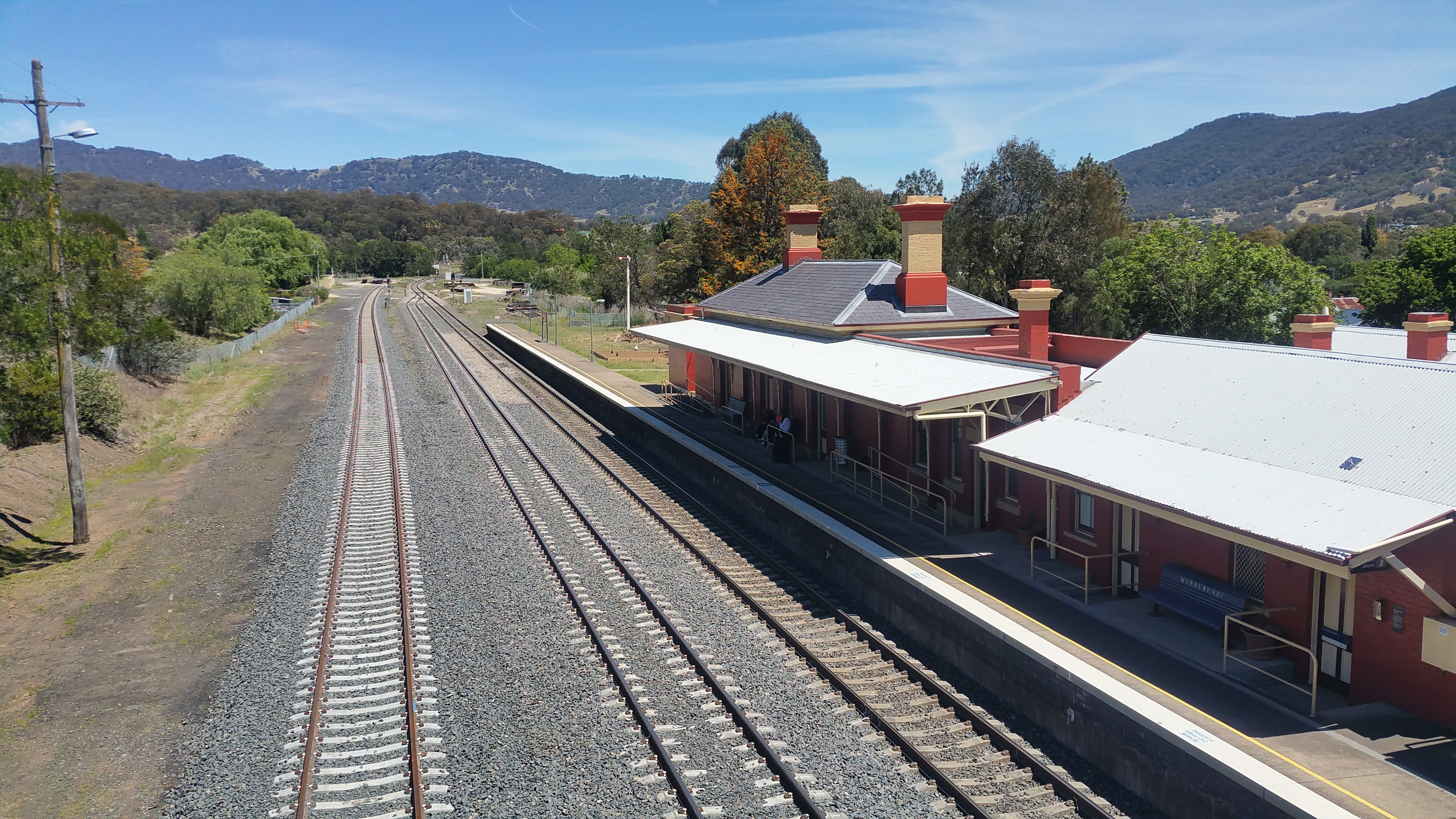
- Northbound view

General information
- Location: Victoria Street, Murrurundi; Australia
- Coordinates: 31°46′06″S 150°50′22″E
- Owner: Transport Asset Manager of New South Wales
- Operator: NSW TrainLink
- Line: Main Northern
- Distance: 352.30 km (218.91 mi) from Central
- Platforms: 1
- Tracks: 3

Construction
- Structure type: Ground
- Accessible: Yes

Other information
- Station code: MDI

History
- Opened: 4 April 1872

Services
Preceding station	NSW TrainLink	Following station
Willow Tree towards Moree or Armidale	NSW TrainLink North Western Line	Scone towards Sydney
Former services
Preceding station	Former services	Following station
Temple Court towards Wallangarra	Main Northern Line	Blandford towards Sydney

New South Wales Heritage Register
- Official name: Murrurundi Railway Station group
- Type: State heritage (complex / group)
- Designated: 2 April 1999
- Reference no.: 1205
- Type: Railway Platform / Station
- Category: Transport – Rail
Location

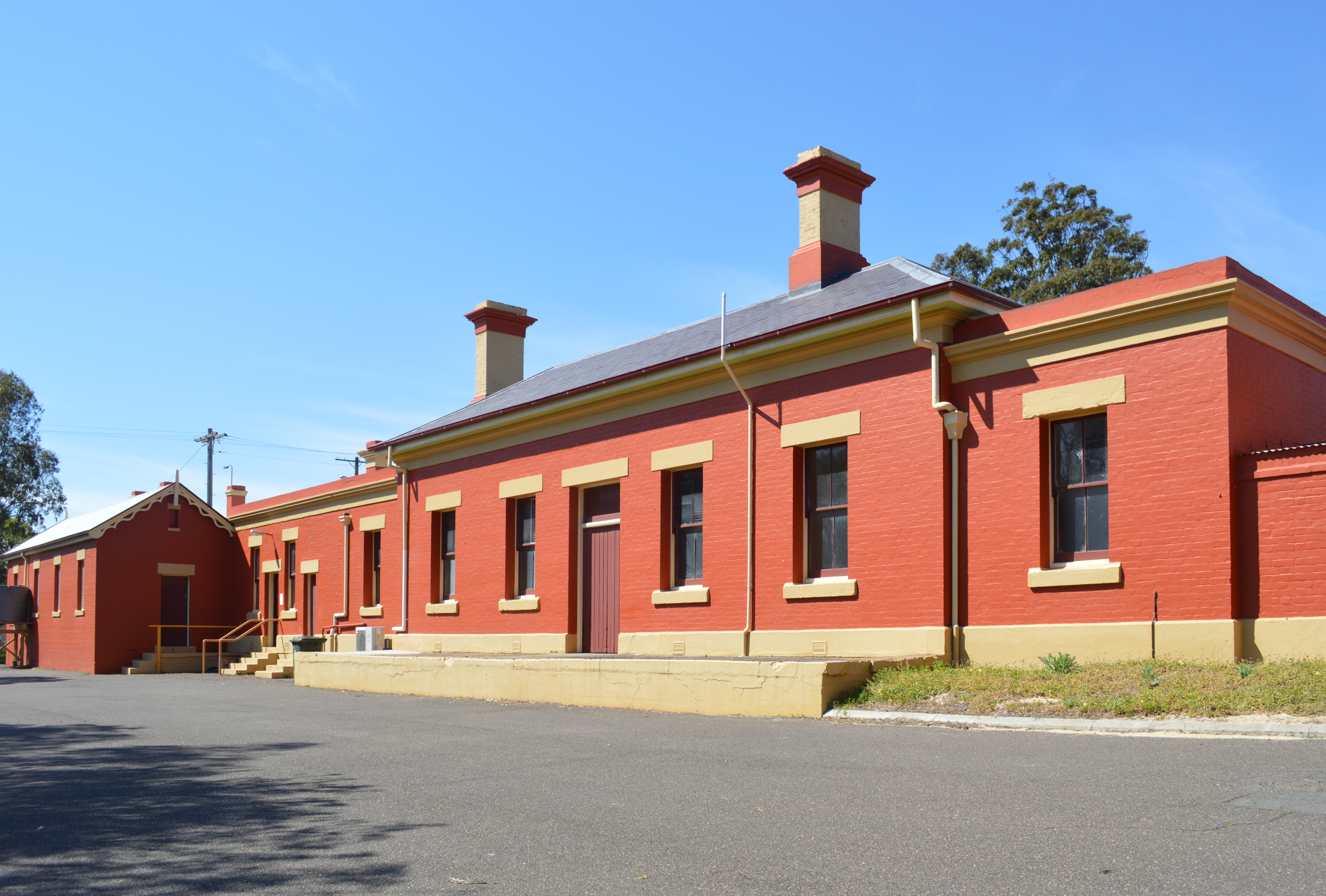
Murrurundi Railway Station

Murrurundi railway station is a heritage-listed railway station located on the Main Northern line in Murrurundi of New South Wales, Australia. It was built between 1872 and 1917. It is also known as Murrurundi Railway Station group. The station serves the town of Murrurundi and opened on 4 April 1872. The station served as the terminus of the line until it was extended to Quirindi on 13 August 1877. The station was added to the New South Wales State Heritage Register on 2 April 1999.

== Services ==
Murrurundi is served by NSW TrainLink's daily Northern Tablelands Xplorer service operating between Armidale/Moree and Sydney. This station is a request stop, so the train only stops here if passengers have booked to board/alight here.

Platform	Line	Stopping pattern	Notes
1	North Western Region	Services to Sydney, Armidale & Moree	request stop (booked passengers only)

== History ==
From 1891 until August 1965, Murrurundi had a four road locomotive depot to the north of the station, primarily as a base for bank engines used on the steeply graded banks over the Liverpool Range to Ardglen Tunnel north of the town. A yard existed opposite the station.

== Description ==
The station has one platform and a passing loop. The complex comprises a type 3, second class, brick station with hip-roof, erected in 1872; a type 18, brick gable building, non-standard, erected c. 1872; a type 18, infill between buildings, erected possibly in 1891; an open timber framed signal box with a non-standard roof, erected in 1917; and a timber store building with a skillion roof. Other structures include brick platform faces.

== Heritage listing ==
Murrurundi had a locomotive depot with a substantial straight shed and locomotive facility at the west end of the yard, all of which has been removed. The remaining structures comprising the station buildings, footbridge, residences and goods shed are a good representative group and are individually good examples of their kind. This has resulted in the station being listed on the New South Wales State Heritage Register on 2 April 1999.
