= Scone, New South Wales =

Town in the Hunter Valley in Australia

Scone
- Town
- Coordinates: 32°05′S 150°51′E
- Country: Australia
- State: New South Wales
- LGA: Upper Hunter Shire
- Location: 271 km (168 mi) N of Sydney; 153 km (95 mi) NW of Newcastle; 27 km (17 mi) N of Muswellbrook; 40 km (25 mi) S of Murrurundi; 131 km (81 mi) S of Tamworth

Government
  - State electorate: Upper Hunter
  - Federal division: New England
- Elevation: 216 m (709 ft)

Population
  - Total: 5,013 (2021 census)
- Postcode: 2337
- Mean max temp: 24.6 °C (76.3 °F)
- Mean min temp: 10.1 °C (50.2 °F)
- Annual rainfall: 612.0 mm (24.09 in)

Scone (/skoʊn/) (Note: While the food known as a scone is pronounced /skɒn/ or /skoʊn/ in Australian English, the town of Scone is always pronounced /skoʊn/.) is a town in the Upper Hunter Shire in the Hunter Region of New South Wales, Australia. At the 2021 census, Scone had a population of 5,013. It is on the New England Highway north of Muswellbrook about 270 kilometres (167.77 miles) north of Sydney, and is part of the New England (federal) and Upper Hunter (state) electorates. Scone is in a farming area and is also noted for breeding Thoroughbred racehorses. It is known as the "Horse capital of Australia".

== History ==
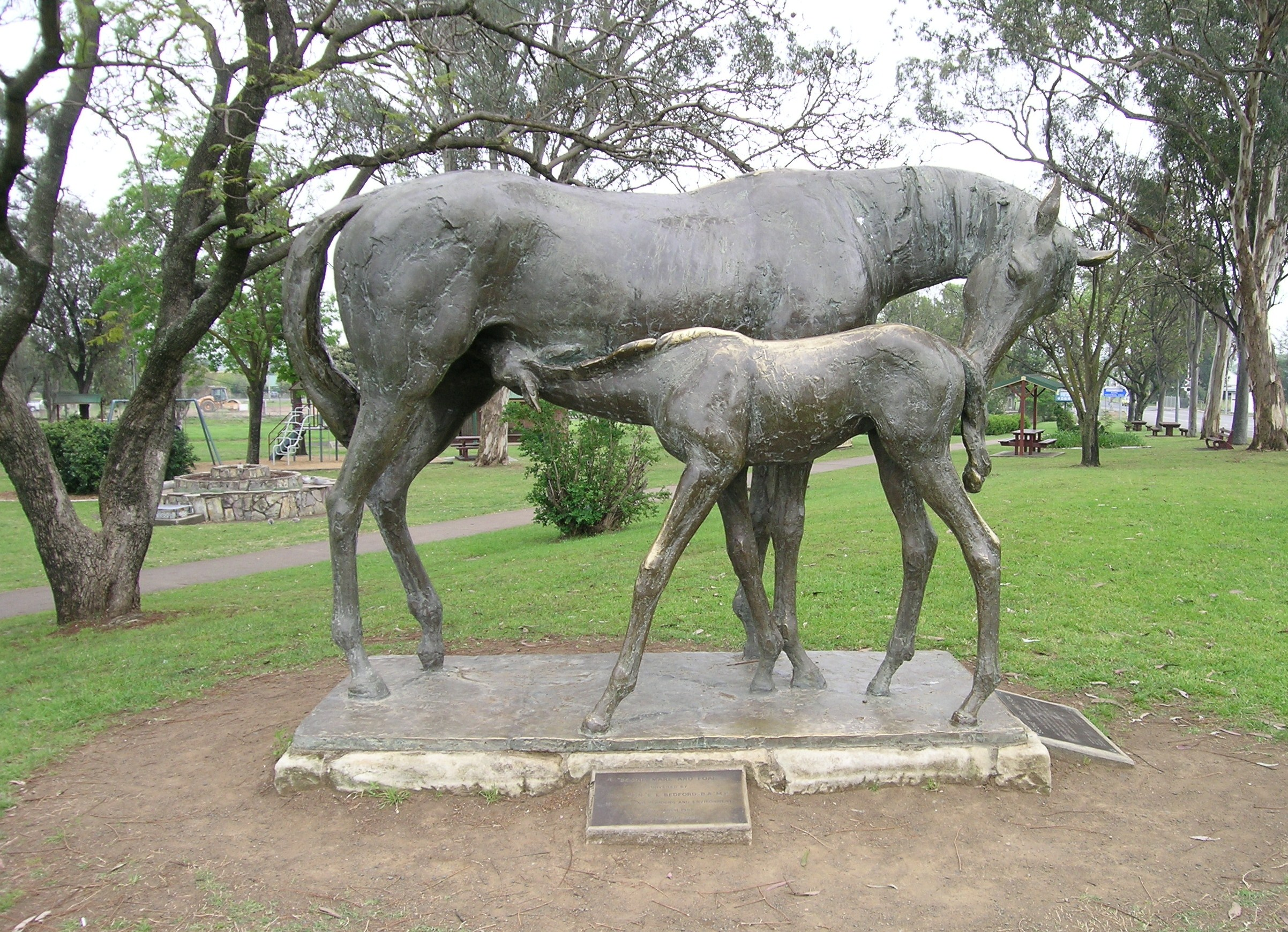
Mare and foal, Scone

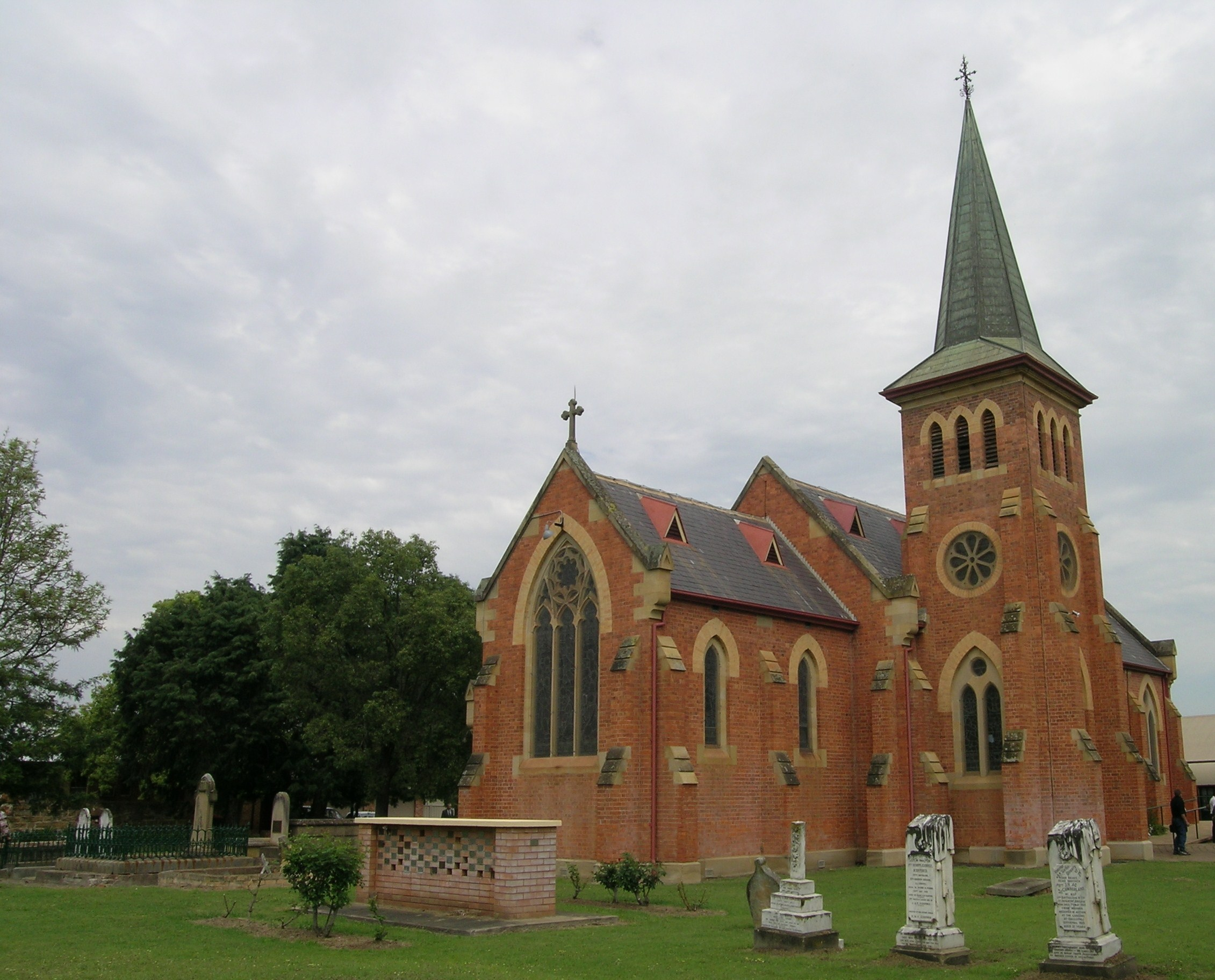
St Luke's Anglican Church, Scone, NSW

Allan Cunningham was the first recorded European person to travel into the Scone area, reaching the Upper Dartbrook and Murrurundi areas in 1823. Surveyor Henry Buffier travelled through the area, prior to passing over the Liverpool Range above Murrurundi in 1824. The first properties in the area were Invermein and Segenhoe in 1825. The town initially started as the village of Redbank in 1826 and in 1831 Hugh Cameron, a Scottish descendant put forward the name of Scone to Thomas Mitchell. It was gazetted as Scone in 1837 and during the early days was renowned for its large pastoral properties including Belltrees and Segenhoe. Early buildings were St Luke's Church, Scone Post Office, the Old Court Theatre (that is now a hall for musicals and plays), and the St Aubins' Inn.

Scone Shire was merged into the Upper Hunter Shire in 2004, integrating parts of the former Murrurundi and Merriwa shires.

The annual Scone Horse Festival is a celebration of Scone's cultural links to equines. It is celebrated during May and includes all manner of activities, including wine tours, Open Days across the numerous horse studs in the area, the Scone rodeo, the Scone School Horse Sports competition, the Black Tie Ball, and a parade in Kelly Street.

The main event is a horse racing carnival featuring the prestigious Scone Cup, one of the richest country racing days in New South Wales and Australia. Small celebrations are also a key part of the festival and include schools, businesses, public events and sports centres. The Horse Festival is also traditionally linked with such events as the Belltrees poetry competition, the yarns night and many other small annual fundraisers and events. Scone also hosts the Inglis Guineas Day, a major race meet, in the middle of May.

The town is also home to some of the very old pony clubs and is known for a happening polo club. Besides these, the region is well known for its dairies and wineries.

Historical population
Year	Pop.	±%
1921	1,800	—
1933	2,176	+20.9%
1947	2,253	+3.5%
1954	3,351	+48.7%
1961	2,680	−20.0%
1966	2,915	+8.8%
1971	3,262	+11.9%
1976	3,424	+5.0%
1981	3,949	+15.3%
1986	4,272	+8.2%
1991	3,329	−22.1%
1996	3,468	+4.2%
2001	4,555	+31.3%
2006	4,624	+1.5%
2011	5,079	+9.8%
2016	4,956	−2.4%
2021	5,013	+1.2%
Source: Australian Bureau of Statistics data.

== Belltrees Country House ==
Located on Gundy Road and is heritage listed. The property is 23,000 acre farm. In 1830 Hamilton Sempill was granted the land and called Belltree after an estate of an ancestor. After Sempill returned to England, it was owned by explorer W C Wentworth. In 1853, Wentworth sold the estate to the sons of John White. Designed J W Pender for Henry Luke White in 1906. In 1912 it was 160,000 enclosed with 3,200 km fencing and 64 buildings.

Currently on the property there is a homestead built in 1908, St James chapel (1887), the original homestead which is now a museum, a trading store (1837) turned into an office, a shearing shed (1880) and a primary school. Patrick White used the property as inspiration for his novel The Eye of the Storm (1973). In 1994 the property became the set for the film A Matter of Honour.

== St Aubin's Arms ==
In 1836 Thomas and Henry Dangar leased 6 acres of property at St Aubin's Village from Captain William Dumaresq. It was built in 1837 and is a pub located on 245 Kelly Street. The first name was "The Bird in Hand' and the first owner was James Briggs until 1838. There was seven rooms with attached attics, and a small paddock and stockyard. In 1838 the pub was owned by George Chivers. In 1840 the pub was robbed by the Jewboy gang. In 1842, John P Wilkie brought the property and renamed it the White Swan Inn. In 1888 the house was built on the property. In 1917 it was put on market but did not sell due to World War I. In 1938 the house was purchased. The property sits on 4 acres of land. It is a brick building with high ceilings, wide verandahs, cedar joinery and an underground cellar. In the 1960s an additional wing was added. The property now has five bedrooms, a library, lounge and dining areas.

== Turanville Estate ==
William Dangar purchased 800 acres and was given permission to purchase the 1800 acres adjacent to the property. It was well known for horse-breeding – producing racehorses and remounts for the Indian Army and attracted clientele from around the world. Built in the early 1870s with 12 rooms and offices. In 1888, a telephone line was installed to connect Turanville to Scone; it was the first connection to Scone from a property. In 1854, Thomas Cook started to work on the property. In 1889, Thomas Cook inherited the property from his uncle William Dangar. After Cook inherited the property, it reached around 10,000 acres; he also built a homestead and gardens. During the 1900s, a new roof made out iron with a front porch was added to replace the shingled one. In 1912, the property was sold to Hugh Corbett Taylor, whose great-grandson still lives on the property. In 1938, Helen Ethel Moore and Douglas Hamilton Robertson took over the property. In 1946, a renovation occurred which included demolishing the separate kitchen block and adding a southern wing to the house. In 1963, Jock Douglas Robertson and his Elizabeth took over running the property. Since 2003, Douglas Hugh Robertson and his wife Nicola now run the property.

== Heritage listings ==
Scone has a number of heritage-listed sites, including:

- 144 Kelly Street: Scone Civic Theatre
- 41 Kingdon Road: Old Court Theatre
- 117 Liverpool Street: Scone Post Office
- Main Northern railway: Scone railway station

== Education ==
One of the first educational groups to be established in New South Wales was a reading society, The Scone Book Society, formed in 1841. This later became the Scone School of Arts, a Mechanics' Institute and library, which occupied buildings in Kingdon Street (1873–1917) and Kelly Street (1924–1954).

Present-day schools include:

- Scone Public School
- Scone High School
- St Mary's Scone
- Scone Grammar School

There is also a campus of TAFE NSW.

== Transport ==
Scone lies on the Main North railway line, and is served by a passenger train service made up of a daily NSW TrainLink train to Sydney and two or three intercity train services to Newcastle.

The town is connected to nearby Gloucester via Scone Road, which traverses the Barrington Tops.

Scone Airport (ICAO code YSCO, IATA code NSO) is located 3.5 kilometers Northwest of the town center. The airport has a 1404-meter asphalt runway. It hosts an aeroclub, a flight school, a warbird collection (Hunter Warbirds) but does not currently have any scheduled airline service.

Osborn's Buses runs a bus service between Scone and Muswellbrook. There are approximately 20 services per week in each direction.

== Media ==
Scone is serviced by a number of regional radio stations, television stations and newspapers.

=== Radio ===
Radio stations include:

- ABC Upper Hunter on 104.7 FM (Regional)
- ABC New England North West can also be heard on 648 AM (Regional)
- ABC RN on 104.1 FM (National)
- ABC NewsRadio on 104.9 FM (National)
- ABC Classic on 103.1 FM (National)
- Hit106.9 on 106.9 FM (Commercial)
- Power FM on 98.1 FM (Community)
- 2NM on 981 AM (Community)

=== Television stations ===
- Seven (formerly branded as Prime7), 7two, 7mate, 7flix, 7Bravo – Seven Network owned and operated station channels.
- Nine (NBN), 9Go!, 9Gem, 9Life – Nine Network affiliated channels, owned by WIN Corporation.
- 10, 10 Drama, 10 Comedy – Network 10 owned and operated station channels.
- ABC, ABC Family, ABC Kids, ABC Entertains and ABC News, part of the Australian Broadcasting Corporation.
- Special Broadcasting Service, SBS, SBS2, SBS Food, SBS WorldWatch, SBS World Movies and NITV.

Subscription Television services are provided by Foxtel.

=== Newspapers ===
The Scone Advocate is the town's local newspaper which publishes on print and online.

== Climate ==
Scone possesses a humid subtropical climate (Köppen: Cfa), with hot, relatively wet summers and mild, relatively dry winters with cool nights. Average maxima vary from 31.8 °C (89.2 °F) in January to 16.7 °C (62.1 °F) in July, while average minima fluctuate between 17.2 °C (63.0 °F) in January and 3.4 °C (38.1 °F) in July. Annual precipitation is moderately low (averaging 612.0 mm (24.09 in)), and is spread across 75.9 precipitation days (over 1.0 mm (0.039 in)). Rainfall is less common in winter than in summer due to the foehn effect, as the town lies on the leeward side of the Great Dividing Range. The town experiences 105.3 clear days and 57.1 cloudy days per annum. Extreme temperatures have ranged from 46.5 °C (115.7 °F) on 12 February 2017 to −5.5 °C (22.1 °F) on 20 July 2023.

Climate data for Scone (32.03°S 150.83°E, 221 m AMSL) (1990–2024 normals & extremes, sun 1965–2018)
Month	Jan	Feb	Mar	Apr	May	Jun	Jul	Aug	Sep	Oct	Nov	Dec	Year
Record high °C (°F)	44.6 (112.3)	46.5 (115.7)	41.2 (106.2)	34.8 (94.6)	28.8 (83.8)	25.1 (77.2)	25.1 (77.2)	29.2 (84.6)	35.2 (95.4)	39.3 (102.7)	43.5 (110.3)	45.3 (113.5)	46.5 (115.7)
Mean daily maximum °C (°F)	31.8 (89.2)	30.7 (87.3)	28.1 (82.6)	24.6 (76.3)	20.4 (68.7)	17.1 (62.8)	16.7 (62.1)	18.9 (66.0)	22.3 (72.1)	25.6 (78.1)	28.2 (82.8)	30.5 (86.9)	24.6 (76.2)
Mean daily minimum °C (°F)	17.2 (63.0)	16.7 (62.1)	14.3 (57.7)	10.0 (50.0)	6.5 (43.7)	4.8 (40.6)	3.3 (37.9)	3.7 (38.7)	6.7 (44.1)	9.7 (49.5)	13.0 (55.4)	15.4 (59.7)	10.1 (50.2)
Record low °C (°F)	6.4 (43.5)	5.9 (42.6)	4.0 (39.2)	−1.7 (28.9)	−3.0 (26.6)	−5.1 (22.8)	−5.5 (22.1)	−5.1 (22.8)	−3.0 (26.6)	0.2 (32.4)	2.8 (37.0)	5.4 (41.7)	−5.5 (22.1)
Average precipitation mm (inches)	61.2 (2.41)	58.3 (2.30)	63.0 (2.48)	34.8 (1.37)	34.7 (1.37)	45.5 (1.79)	39.3 (1.55)	36.7 (1.44)	35.4 (1.39)	52.0 (2.05)	77.9 (3.07)	74.3 (2.93)	612.0 (24.09)
Average precipitation days (≥ 1.0 mm)	6.0	5.8	6.7	4.1	4.4	6.1	5.0	4.3	4.8	5.7	6.7	6.7	66.3
Average afternoon relative humidity (%)	41	47	47	49	51	58	55	47	44	42	43	42	47
Average dew point °C (°F)	13.9 (57.0)	15.2 (59.4)	13.7 (56.7)	10.9 (51.6)	8.0 (46.4)	7.2 (45.0)	5.8 (42.4)	5.1 (41.2)	7.0 (44.6)	8.5 (47.3)	10.7 (51.3)	12.4 (54.3)	9.9 (49.8)
Mean monthly sunshine hours	260.4	220.4	226.3	213.0	186.0	150.0	186.0	226.3	231.0	254.2	246.0	263.5	2,663.1
Percentage possible sunshine	60	59	60	63	57	50	58	66	65	64	60	60	60
Source: Bureau of Meteorology (1990–2024 normals & extremes, sun 1965–2018)

== Sport and recreation ==
Scone Polo Club was established in 1891.

== See also ==
- Scone railway station, New South Wales
- Scone Thoroughbreds
