= Temple Court railway station =

Former railway station in New South Wales, Australia

Temple Court

General information
- Location: Pages River Road, Murrurundi; New South Wales; Australia
- Coordinates: 31°45′50″S 150°49′35″E
- Operator: Public Transport Commission
- Line: Main North
- Distance: 353.611 km (219.724 mi) from Central
- Platforms: 1 (1 side)
- Tracks: 1

Construction
- Structure type: Ground

Other information
- Status: Demolished

History
- Opened: April 1878 (148 years ago)
- Closed: 20 February 1975 (51 years ago)

Services
Preceding station	Former services	Following station
Ardglen towards Wallangarra	Main Northern Line	Murrurundi towards Sydney
Location

Temple Court railway station was a regional railway station on the Main North line, serving the outskirts of the Hunter Valley town of Murrurundi. The station was opened in 1878 and closed in 1975. No trace of it now remains.

== History ==
A kerosene shale deposit had been located in early 1862, but the difficult terrain of the Liverpool Ranges provided transport problems. In 1871, a shale mine was started north of the area at Mount Temi.

Temple Court opened in late April 1878, providing the mine and workers with a nearby rail service. However, it was only from 1905 that significant progress was made to develop the deposit. A loop siding, north of Temple Court, was constructed in 1910, as was a short rail line from Temple Court to the site of the shale oil retorts that were operated by the British Australian Oil Company from late 1911 to early 1915. While the retorts operated, the line carried crude shale oil destined for the company's refinery at Hamilton. It was lifted in 1931. A part of the branch railway's formation, between the existing Main North railway and Pages River, is still discernible, as a curved embankment. Another part of the old railway route is Elizabeth Street in Murrurundi. The station at Temple Court was closed to passenger services on 20 February 1975, and subsequently demolished, with no remains present at the site.
