= Ardglen Tunnel =

Railway tunnel in New South Wales, Australia

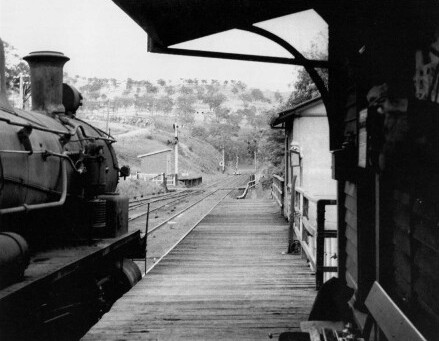
- Ardglen station with a train past summit of the Liverpool Range, 26 October 1954
- Interactive map of Ardglen Tunnel

Overview
- Official name: Ardglen Tunnel
- Other names: Liverpool Range tunnel Doughboy Hollow
- Line: Main North railway
- Coordinates: 31°44′29″S 150°47′48″E
- Crosses: Liverpool Range

Operation
- Work began: 1874
- Constructed: Mr. J. Wolfe; Mr. William Wakeford
- Opened: 13 August 1877

Technical
- Length: 528 yards (483 m)
- Track gauge: 4 ft 8 1/2 in (1,435 mm)
- Min elevation: 2,161 feet (659 m)

New South Wales Heritage Register
- Official name: Ardglen Tunnel
- Type: State heritage (built)
- Criteria: f.
- Designated: 2 April 1999
- Reference no.: 1021
- Type: Railway Tunnel
- Category: Transport - Rail

The Ardglen Tunnel, also called the Liverpool Range tunnel, is a heritage-listed summit rail tunnel located on the Main North railway between the village of Ardglen and Murrurundi in New South Wales, Australia. The tunnel crosses under the Liverpool Range near its east end, below Nowlands Gap (otherwise known as Murrurundi Gap), the crossing used by the New England Highway, and provides a vital link between Newcastle and Werris Creek. The tunnel was completed in 1877 and is owned by the Transport Asset Holding Entity, a state-owned corporation of the Government of New South Wales. It was added to the New South Wales State Heritage Register on 2 April 1999.

== Description ==
The tunnel is 528 yards (483 m) long, and is approached on either side by 10-kilometre (6.2 mi) climbs at the ruling grade of 1 in 40 (2.5%). The single track tunnel, the oldest of its type in use in New South Wales, when combined with the steep grades, make this section of the Main North rail line a rail bottleneck.

Construction of the tunnel was commenced by boring from both ends. The new line from Murrurundi had been finished up to the east of the tunnel to aid in the supply of materials, and the two bores had met with the tunnel navigable by foot. By June 1876 the tunnel was enlarged and brick lined with track laid. The contractors engine made it through the tunnel by July 1876. The line to Quirindi was opened in August 1877.

=== Fumes ===
The Ardglen Tunnel is at the summit of ruling grades, and because of its narrow profile, it created fume problems during steam days. Larger locomotives, such as the 60-class Garratt, were either prohibited or limited in load. Fortunately most heavy trains went through the tunnel in the downhill direction, towards Sydney and Newcastle.

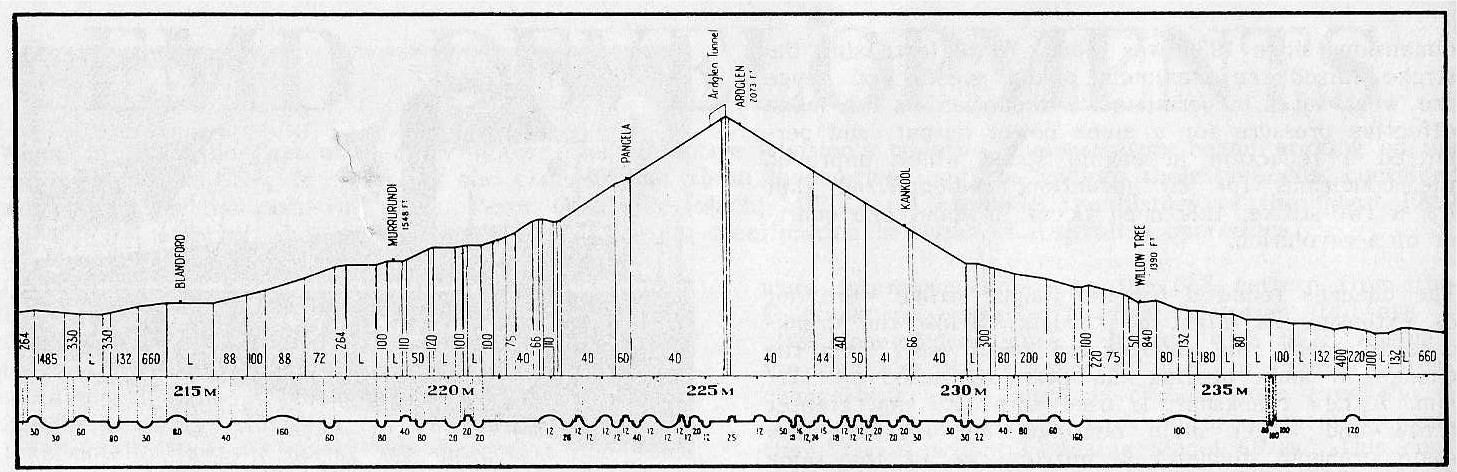
The modern ARTC Curve and Gradient chart shows the tunnel as being level. Sydney and Newcastle are to the left.

=== Proposed deviations ===
To cope with considerably increased coal traffic from north of the tunnel from 2010 and beyond, various deviations are proposed. These deviations can either keep the existing summit tunnel, or bore a much longer tunnel at a 200-metre (660 ft) lower elevation. The deviations that keep the existing tunnel increase the length of the line so as to ease the gradient to 1 in 80 which is the ruling gradient on the rest of the line to the port. The existing line would be retained for empty trains going the other way, so forming double track.

=== Stations ===
The stations on either side of Ardglen Tunnel from the south are:

- Murrurundi – medium length crossing loop and start of ruling grades. Had a locomotive depot for bank engines in steam days
- Pangela – closed short crossing loop on ruling gradient
- Ardglen Tunnel – summit
- Ardglen – medium length crossing loop and railway station, being further lengthened in 2010
- Kankool – short crossing loop on ruling gradient
- Willow Tree – medium length crossing loop and railway station and end of ruling grades

== Heritage listing ==
Ardglen tunnel is of high significance as the oldest single line tunnel in use in the State and as one of the very few remaining single line tunnels in use. It is also an important landscape element at the head of the ridge which is approached by steep grades in both directions.

Ardglen Tunnel was listed on the New South Wales State Heritage Register on 2 April 1999 having satisfied the following criteria.

The place possesses uncommon, rare or endangered aspects of the cultural or natural history of New South Wales.

This item is assessed as historically rare. This item is assessed as scientifically rare. This item is assessed as archeologically rare. This item is assessed as socially rare.

== See also ==
- List of tunnels in Australia
