= Thersites coolahensis =

Scientific classification
- Kingdom: Animalia
- Phylum: Mollusca
- Class: Gastropoda
- Order: Stylommatophora
- Family: Camaenidae
- Genus: Thersites
- Species: T. coolahensis

Binomial name
- Thersites coolahensis Zhang & Köhler, 2025

Species of gastropod

Thersites coolahensis is a species of large, air-breathing land snail, a terrestrial gastropod mollusc in the family Camaenidae.

It is endemic to New South Wales, Australia, and is known from the Coolah Tops region.

The species was formally described in 2025 by Guoyi Zhang and Frank Köhler as part of a taxonomic revision of the Australian land-snail genus Thersites.

== Taxonomy ==
Before its formal description, the species had been referred to as Camaenidae SN30 by Murphy and Shea in 2023.

The holotype, AM C.271928, is deposited in the Australian Museum and was collected at Coolah Tops, New South Wales, at approximately 31.82°S, 150.20°E. A paratype, AM C.271927, was collected nearby at approximately 31.82°S, 150.21°E.

== Description ==
The shell is depressed-globose and brownish, with an open umbilicus and without spiral bands. The body whorl ranges from rounded to angled. The protoconch is smooth, while the teleoconch bears fine radial wrinkles and ridgelets. The aperture is reflected and the callus is distinct.

The shell measures 26.5–32.9 mm in height, with a shell height-to-width ratio of 0.79–0.88.

In the reproductive anatomy, the flagellum has a sharp tip and measures 2.3–2.8 mm in length. The distal portion of the epiphallus measures 3.2–3.5 mm.

== Distribution ==
Thersites coolahensis is known from the Coolah Tops region of inland New South Wales. Like T. kaputarensis, it occurs west of the Great Dividing Range in comparatively dry habitats, extending the known ecological range of the genus beyond the predominantly mesic forests occupied by the previously recognized species.

The lineage was initially recognized from surveys of land snails inhabiting drier sclerophyll woodland in central-eastern New South Wales.

== Etymology ==
The specific epithet coolahensis refers to Coolah Tops, the type locality of the species.
