= The Murrurundi Times and Liverpool Plains Gazette =

The Murrurundi Times and Liverpool Plains Gazette, also published as The Murrurundi and Quirindi Times and Liverpool Plains Gazette, was an English language newspaper published in Murrurundi, New South Wales, Australia from 1871 to 1933.

== History ==
The Murrurundi Times and Liverpool Plains Gazette was first published by Robert Burgess in Murrurundi in 1871. It was also briefly published as the Upper Hunter Courier : Murrurundi edition in 1871 by Richard Thatcher. The name was changed to The Murrurundi and Quirindi Times and Liverpool Plains Gazette in 1885 when the Quirindi Gazette and Liverpool Plains Advocate began to be published in Quirindi in competition. At some point between 1907 and 1926 the name reverted to The Murrurundi Times and Liverpool Plains Gazette. In 1929 it was bought by The Quirindi Advocate which then incorporated it in 1933.

== Digitisation ==
The newspaper has been digitised as part of the Australian Newspapers Digitisation Program project hosted by the National Library of Australia.

== See also ==
- List of newspapers in New South Wales
- List of newspapers in Australia
