= Coolah, New South Wales =

Coolah
- Town
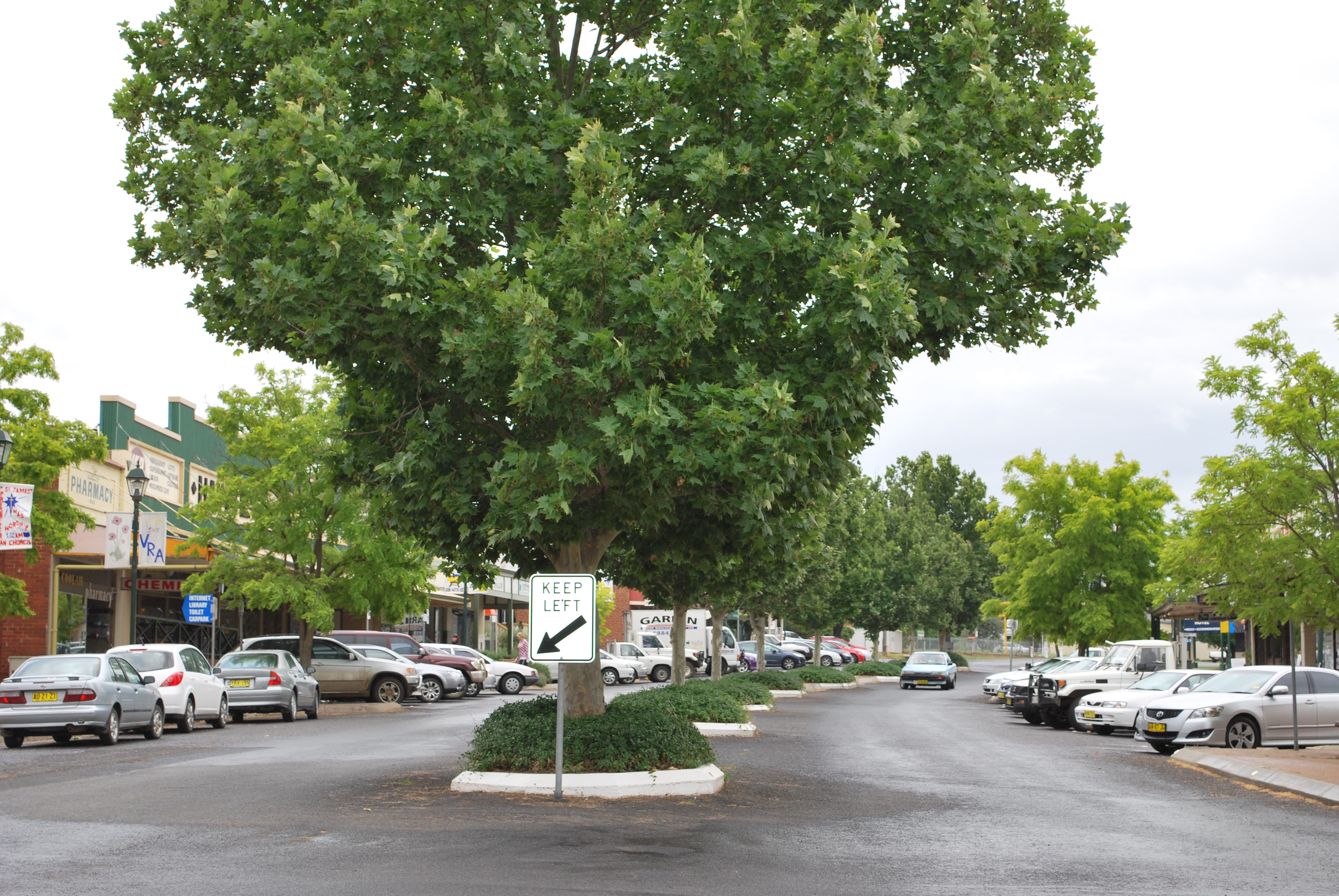
- Main street

- Coordinates: 31°50′0″S 149°43′0″E
- Country: Australia
- State: New South Wales
- LGA: Warrumbungle Shire
- Location: 370 km (230 mi) NW of Sydney; 136 km (85 mi) NE of Dubbo; 80 km (50 mi) NW of Merriwa

Government
  - State electorate: Barwon
  - Federal division: Parkes

Population
  - Total: 1,290 (2016 census)
- Postcode: 2843

Coolah is a town in the central western part of New South Wales, Australia in Warrumbungle Shire. At the 2016 census, Coolah had a population of 1,290. The name Coolah is derived from the Port Jackson Pidgin English word meaning "angry".

== Geography ==
On the northeastern side of the area is the Liverpool Range with the Coolah Tops National Park. Most of the region is agricultural with sheep and cattle raising and crops grown along the Talbragar River and Coolaburragundy River valleys.

== History ==
Coolah was initially the lands of the Wiradjuri and Kamilaroi People. It is said the valley was often used as a meeting ground between peoples of the two nations. The area was also the home to King Togee, who is regarded as a legendary leader of his people. His gravesite is on the Neilrex Road to the west of Coolah. The Coolah area was first colonised by British pastoralists in the late 1830s. A Border Police barracks was established at Coolah around 1840 under Graham Douglas Hunter who was the Commissioner for Crown Lands for the Bligh District. Coolah Post Office opened on 1 January 1849. The town was served by the Coolah railway line from March 1920 until May 1975.

Cadbury Schweppes introduced a citrus-flavoured energy drink in the US in 2006 named Coolah Energy. The text on the packaging for this product refers to the Australian Cadbury Schweppes product Solo as its inspiration, along with the lifestyle of the inhabitants of the town of Coolah.

Coolah is the location of the first Australian memorial commemorating The Battle of Long Tan. A total of 18 trees were planted along Coolah's Vietnam Memorial Avenue, one for each Australian soldier killed during the battle.

== Heritage listings ==
Coolah has a number of heritage-listed sites, including:

- 74 Binnia Street: Old Police Station and Courthouse

== Population ==
In the 2016 Census, there were 1,290 people in Coolah. 83.0% of people were born in Australia and 87.7% of people spoke only English at home. The most common responses for religion were Anglican 39.6%, Catholic 20.1% and No Religion 17.4%.

== Sport ==
The Coolah Kangaroos formerly competed in the Castlereagh Cup until the 2000s. Prior to this they also played in the Mid West Cup. The club still fields junior teams in the Group 14 Rugby League competition, alongside netball teams.

== People ==
- Richard Butler (born 1942), public servant
- Lisa Messenger, entrepreneur and author
- Gary Scully, journalist and foreign correspondent
- Monty Porter, rugby league player
