= Ardglen, New South Wales =

Ardglen
- Town
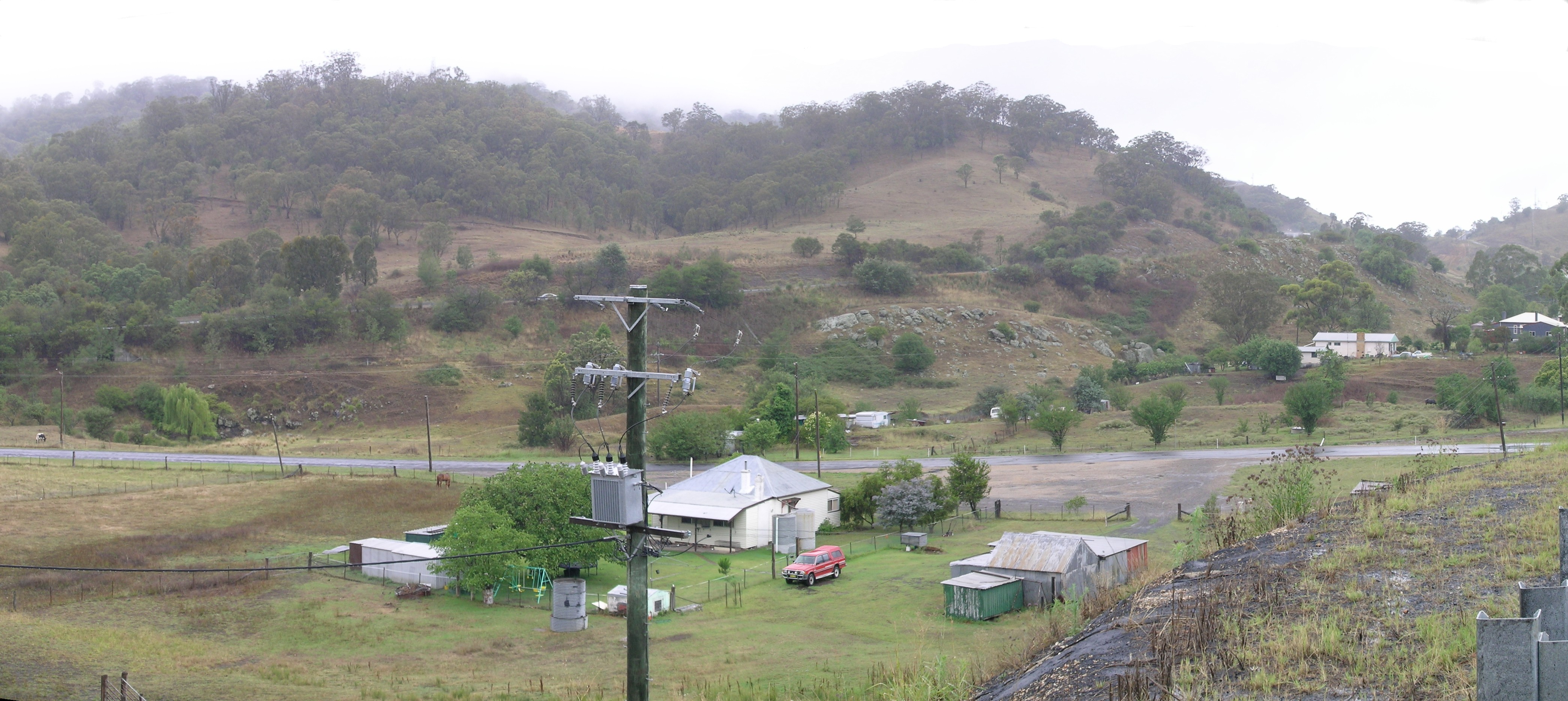
- Ardglen

- Coordinates: 31°45′S 150°47′E
- Country: Australia
- State: New South Wales
- LGA: Liverpool Plains Shire
- Location: 5 km (3.1 mi) from Murrurundi

Government
  - State electorate: Upper Hunter
  - Federal division: New England
- Elevation: 703 m (2,306 ft)

Population
  - Total: 50 (SAL 2021)
- Postcode: 2338
- County: Buckland

Ardglen is a village on the Main North railway line and close to the New England Highway on the North West Slopes region of New South Wales, Australia.

== History ==
A railway station was opened there on 13 August 1877 as Doughboy Hollow, which was later renamed Ardglen on 29 June 1893. No trace of the railway station now exists. The significant 488 metre single-track rail tunnel, Ardglen Tunnel, passes through the Liverpool Range south of the former rail station site. It is one of the very few remaining single-track tunnels in use.

This tunnel is at the summit of the line at the watershed, with ruling grades of 1 in 40 approaching in both directions. Bank engines are required for the heaviest trains.

Doughboy Hollow Post Office opened on 16 November 1877, was renamed Ardglen in 1893 and closed in 1983.

The former public school has now closed.

The NSW Railways has been operating a hard rock quarry for over 100 years near Ardglen village.

Ardglen is in the Liverpool Plains Shire local government area (LGA) and Buckland County.

== Heritage listings ==
Ardglen has a number of heritage-listed sites, including:

- Main Northern railway: Ardglen Tunnel

Preceding station	Former services	Following station
Kankool towards Wallangarra	Main Northern Line	Temple Court towards Sydney
