= Isis River (New South Wales) =

Coordinates: 31°58′59″S 151°00′47″E

Location
- Country: Australia
- State: New South Wales
- Region: NSW North Coast (IBRA), Upper Hunter
- Local government area: Upper Hunter

Physical characteristics
- Source: Great Dividing Range
  - location: below Crawney Mountain
  - elevation: 683 m (2,241 ft)
- Mouth: confluence with the Pages River
  - location: near Belltrees, northeast of Scone
  - elevation: 243 m (797 ft)
- Length: 70 km (43 mi)

Basin features
- River system: Hunter River catchment
- Tributaries
  - right: Timor Creek, Green Creek (New South Wales)

Isis River, a perennial river of the Hunter River catchment, is located in the Upper Hunter region of New South Wales, Australia.

== Course and features ==
Isis River rises on the southern slopes of the Great Dividing Range, below Crawney Mountain, northeast of Murrurundi and flows generally south, joined by two minor tributaries before reaching its confluence with the Pages River near Belltrees, northeast of Scone. The river descends 440 metres (1,440 ft) over its 70-kilometre (43 mi) course.

== See also ==
- Rivers of New South Wales
- List of rivers of New South Wales (A–K)
- List of rivers of Australia
