= Kankool, New South Wales =

Locality in New South Wales, Australia

Coordinates: 31°41′55″S 150°46′04″E

Kankool is a locality in the Hunter Region of New South Wales, Australia. A now closed railway station was located on the Main North railway line. The station opened in 1909, and no trace now remains.

Preceding station	Former services	Following station
Willow Tree towards Wallangarra	Main Northern Line	Ardglen towards Sydney
