= Coolah Tops National Park =

National park of Australia

- IUCN category II (national park)
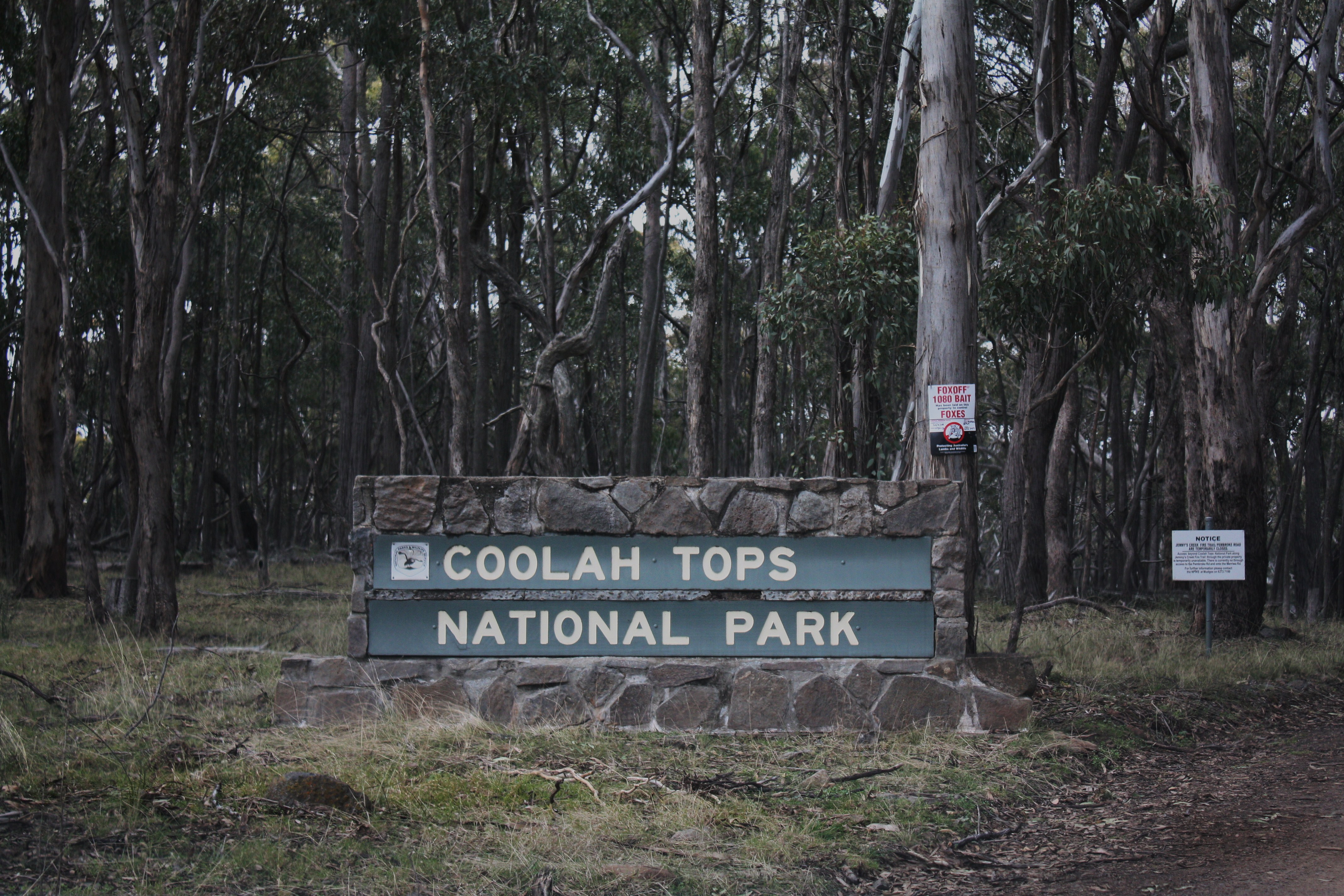
- Coolah Tops National Park entrance

- Location within New South Wales
- Location: New South Wales
- Nearest city: Coolah
- Coordinates: 31°45′03″S 150°04′17″E
- Established: 5 July 1996
- Governing body: NSW National Parks and Wildlife Service

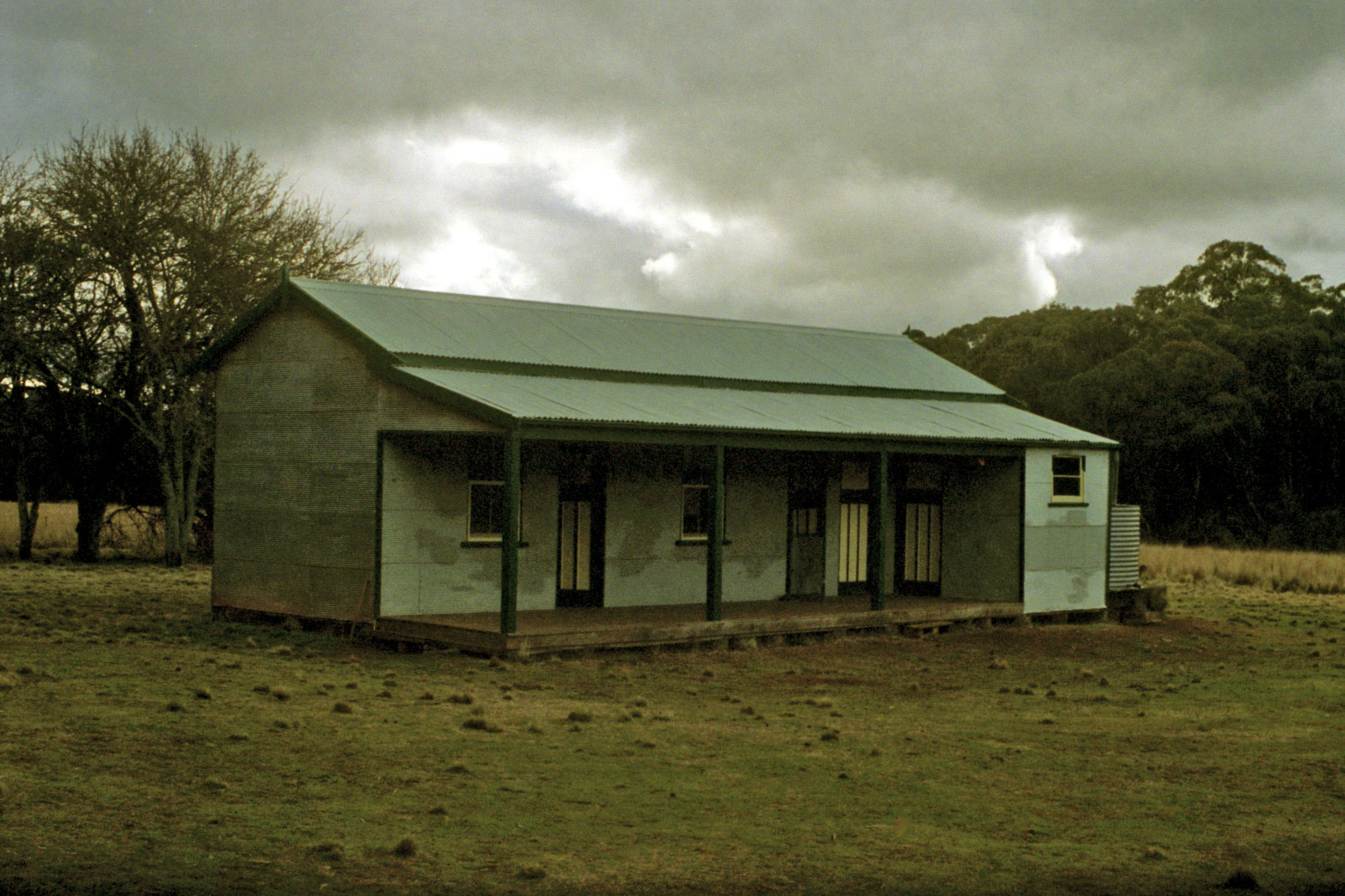
Bracken's Cottage, Coolah Tops National Park

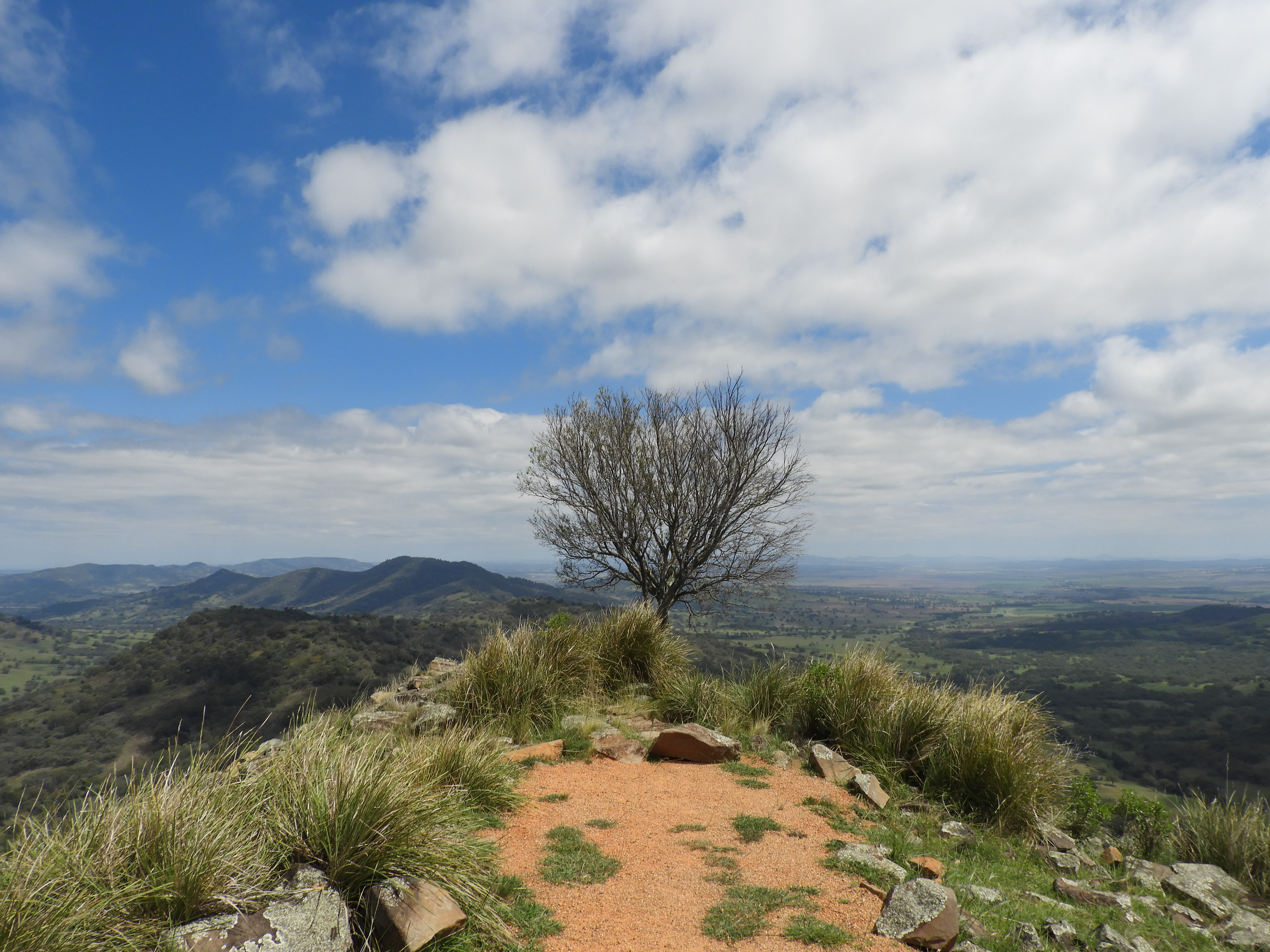
Pinnacle Lookout, Coolah Tops National Park

Coolah Tops is a national park located in New South Wales, Australia, 258 kilometres (160 mi) northwest of Sydney, established on 5 July 1996. It is managed by the New South Wales National Parks and Wildlife Service. Its World Conservation Union category is II. It is situated 30 kilometres (19 mi) east of Coolah in the Liverpool Range, on the Coolah Creek Road.

The park features waterfalls that plunge from the plateau. Giant grass trees and open forest with stands of snow gums shelter gliders, wallabies, eagles and owls.

It is home to one of the largest populations of greater gliders in Australia.

Camping and walking are the main recreational activities performed here. Views from the tops are possible over the Liverpool Plains.

The sources of the Talbragar River and the Coolaburragundy River lie in the park.

The park is managed consistent with a statutory plan of management adopted in 2003.

== See also ==
- Protected areas of New South Wales
