= Gary Scully =

Australian journalist

Gary Scully (1933–2011) was a Walkley award-winning Australian journalist and foreign correspondent.

== Early life ==
Born in Sydney on 7 September 1933, Gary Vincent Scully was the son of Doris (née Bunyan) and Vincent Scully, a World War I Australian Army veteran working as a stock and station agent at Coolah, near Mudgee, New South Wales.

The family moved to Bathurst when Vincent re-enlisted in the Army in 1938, with Doris moving to Sydney with Gary to live with relatives after Vincent was killed in World War II in 1944. Gary attended St Joseph's College in Hunters Hill until graduating in 1949.

== Career ==
Scully worked as a copy boy for Consolidated Press in 1950, obtaining a cadetship at The Daily Mirror the following year. He worked for the Richmond River Express in Casino, New South Wales in 1951 and 1952 before moving to Brisbane where he obtained a cadetship at the ABC.

He married bank officer Lorraine Smith in 1955 and in ensuing years the couple had four children, Michael, Catherine, Susan and Anne. The couple moved to Sydney soon after their wedding and Scully worked in general news at the ABC Sydney until appointed the ABC's national industrial reporter in 1958. Scully was national vice-president of the Australian Journalists' Association for 10 years.

Scully was appointed ABC foreign correspondent in Indonesia for two years in 1974 but fortunately was on leave in London at the time of the infamous Balibo killings in East Timor. In 1976 he returned to Australia where he worked as a senior television reporter in Sydney. His coverage of a siege in Rose Bay in 1979 earned him a coveted Walkley Award and in 1980 a Thorn Award for the same story.

In 1983 he was appointed head of the National Media Liaison Service in Canberra by the Hawke government.

He retired in 1991, continuing to work as a freelance journalist until his death. He wrote his own obituary in the pages of The Sydney Morning Herald.
