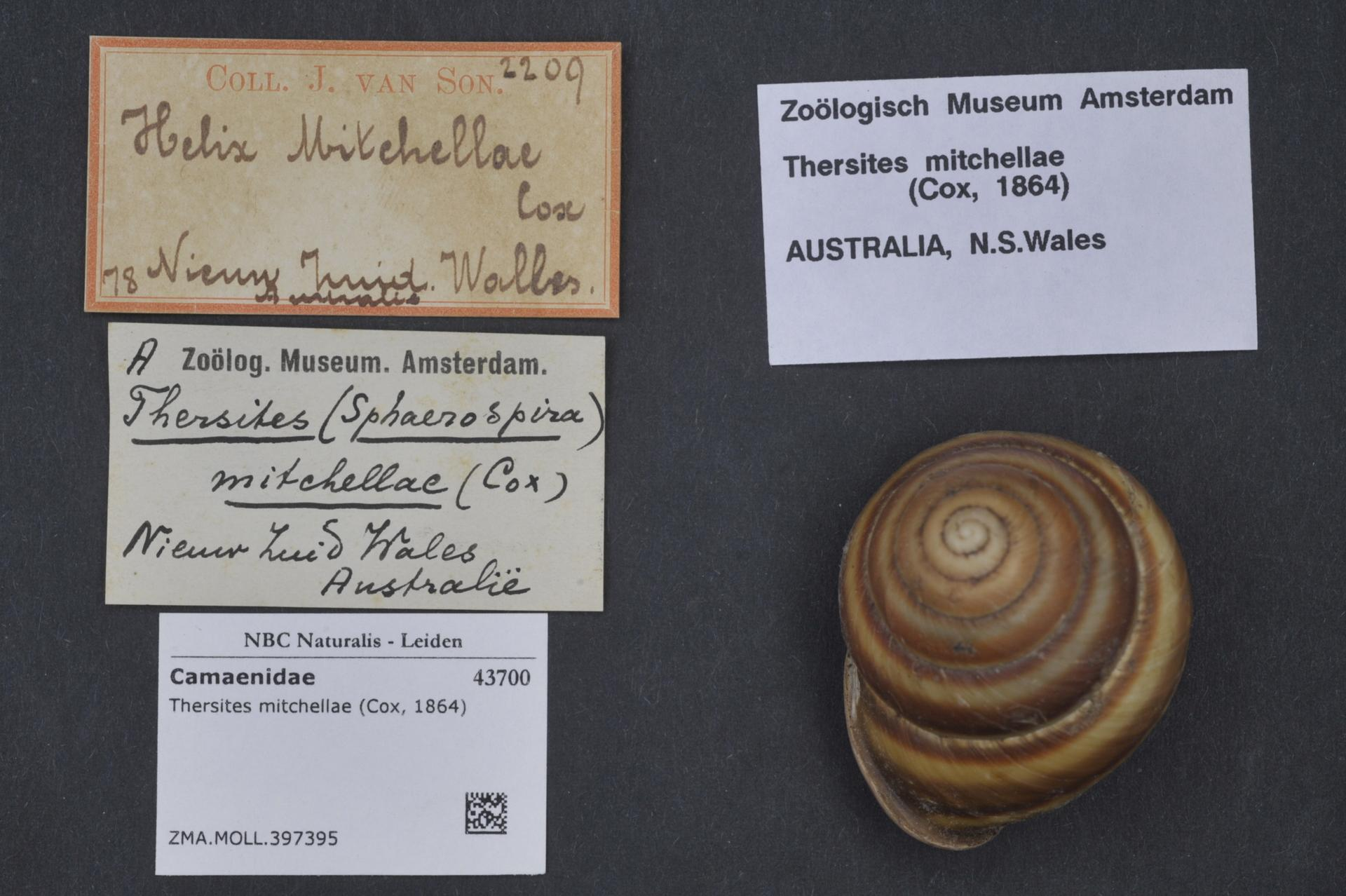
- Shell historically identified as Thersites mitchellae, now considered a synonym of T. novaehollandiae

Scientific classification
- Kingdom: Animalia
- Phylum: Mollusca
- Class: Gastropoda
- Order: Stylommatophora
- Family: Camaenidae
- Genus: Thersites
- Species: T. novaehollandiae

Binomial name
- Thersites novaehollandiae (Gray, 1834)

Synonyms
- Carocolla novaehollandiae J. E. Gray, 1834; Annakelea peragrans Iredale, 1937; Helix mitchellae J. C. Cox, 1864; Thersites mitchellae (J. C. Cox, 1864); Helix dupuyana L. Pfeiffer, 1853

= Thersites novaehollandiae =

Species of snail

Thersites novaehollandiae is a species of large, air-breathing land snail, a terrestrial gastropod mollusc in the family Camaenidae. It is native to eastern Australia.

A 2025 taxonomic revision of the genus Thersites, integrating genome-scale molecular data and morphological characters, synonymized Thersites mitchellae with T. novaehollandiae in order to maintain monophyletic species.

== Taxonomy ==
The species was originally described by John Edward Gray in 1834 as Carocolla novaehollandiae. The type locality was given as the Macquarie River, Australia.

Several names have subsequently been applied to populations now assigned to T. novaehollandiae. Helix dupuyana Pfeiffer, 1853 was described from material from the Bellinger River, while Helix mitchellae Cox, 1864 was described from the Clarence River. Annakelea peragrans Iredale, 1937 was described from Bangalow.

Thersites mitchellae was historically regarded as a separate species, including in the taxonomic revision by Bishop (1978) and subsequent Australian land-snail literature. Molecular phylogenetic work later showed that T. novaehollandiae, as previously circumscribed, was paraphyletic with respect to T. mitchellae. In their 2025 revision, Zhang, Cassis and Köhler integrated genome-scale molecular data with continuous and discrete morphological characters and treated T. mitchellae as a junior synonym of T. novaehollandiae.

The currently recognized T. novaehollandiae therefore includes populations formerly identified as T. mitchellae.

== Description ==
Thersites novaehollandiae has a depressed-globose to more elevated shell with a closed umbilicus. The body whorl is rounded in most specimens. Shell height ranges from 19.9 to 64.2 mm and shell width from 31.1 to 71.6 mm, with a shell height-to-width ratio of 0.61–1.18.

The reproductive anatomy is variable. The flagellum is 7.4–11.5 mm long and usually has a sharp tip, while the distal portion of the epiphallus measured in the 2025 revision ranges from 3.8 to 28.1 mm. Spiral lines on the surface of the body whorl may be present or absent.

== Distribution ==
Thersites novaehollandiae occurs in eastern New South Wales, Australia. Under its revised taxonomic circumscription, its distribution includes localities previously attributed to both T. novaehollandiae and T. mitchellae.

Historically, T. novaehollandiae sensu stricto was reported from temperate and subtropical rainforest in eastern New South Wales, while populations identified as T. mitchellae were principally recorded from the coastal lowlands of north-eastern New South Wales.
