= Rosedale Cottage =

- Location within New South Wales Location within Australia
- 31°45′44″S 150°50′09″E
- Location: Mount Street, Murrurundi, Upper Hunter Shire, New South Wales, Australia

History
- Built: 1845–1850

Site notes
- Owner: Mrs Emilia Louise Archibald

New South Wales Heritage Register
- Official name: Rosedale Cottage
- Type: State heritage (built)
- Designated: 2 April 1999
- Reference no.: 421
- Type: Cottage
- Category: Residential buildings (private)

The Rosedale Cottage is a heritage-listed residence at Mount Street, Murrurundi, Upper Hunter Shire, New South Wales, Australia. It was built from 1845 to 1850. The property is privately owned. It was added to the New South Wales State Heritage Register on 2 April 1999.

== History ==
The original-five roomed cottage was built probably between 1845 and 1850 on 300 hectares (740 acres) of land granted in 1840 to George Hall. This original section of Rosedale Cottage is of brick construction, built up from a sandstone base course. Sandstone quoins have been used at the corners and reveals to openings. The heads and sills are also made of sandstone. The verandah is sandstone, flagged on a sandstone base course. The roof structure is timber which was originally shingled and later covered with corrugated iron. The eaves have a fascia and boxed soffit of boards with a ventilation space. Internal walls are construction of brick, which are plastered and papered. The floors are timber boards and ceilings include metal tiles and sheets, lath and plaster, fibrous plaster, and tongue and groove boarding.

The property was acquired in 1883 by William Wilson, whose family owned the property until 1935 and it was during this period of occupation the major changes occurred at Rosedale. The family was large and apparently prosperous, employed several servants and entertained a great deal. During the period, the family donated the southern part of the property for a park, known as "Wilson Park" and land for the "Wilson Memorial Hospital".

Most of the extensions and renovations appear to have been carried out during this time. The two major additions were of timber-framed construction on wooden stumps. The first extension (probably in the 1890s) is thought to be the bay window which enlarges the room, apparently used as a sitting room. The dining room was added, together with the middle verandah. The kitchen block was connected to the dining room by a covered way.

The second addition, the eastern wing, was thought to have been built about 1901. The detached timber building just north of the new dining room was built beside the kitchen block and used as a dormitory by the five sons. It was known as the boy's room. Other buildings include meat house near the old dining room fireplace, an office east of the boys' room, a dairy room and a small room known as "the factory" which was used for making preserves. Further to the north were a hayshed, a shed for two or three buggies, stables, a woolshed, milking bails, poultry shed and associated stockyards.

During the Wilson ownership there was a pleasant garden with grapevine trellises at the rear and along the verandah of the eastern wing, a fernery north of the sitting room, a flower garden near the eastern wing and the boys' room, and a vegetable garden near the well. There were fruit trees west of the buildings and an orchard over near Little Street.

One approaches the homestead along the present access road and came through a big gate into the big space in the north western corner of the group of buildings. A picket fence ran from the kitchen being northwards towards the sheds and a line of trees ran along here (the present row of kurrajongs). There were no palm trees at that time but the pine tree at the south west corner was there. The river flats south of the house (new parkland) were planted with lucerne at that time and there was apparently no fence near the house on its southern side.

W. A. Wilson died in 1913. After Emelie Wilson's (his wife's) death in 1923, or 1928, the house was occupied by her daughter Muriel until the property was sold in 1935. A major subdivision occurred in 1930 reducing the property to 30 hectares (73 acres). The Parkin family bought the property.

During their ownership, a new kitchen and entrance was built between the dining room and the bay window room and the earlier kitchen block was demolished. The small bedroom in the old brick part of the house was converted to a bathroom. The eastern wing was converted int a self-contained flat. The western end of the boys' room was converted into a laundry and a new meathouse was built just north of the boys' room. Palm trees were planted during this period.

== Description ==
Land

300 hectares (740 acres) acres of land granted in 1840 to George Hall.

Garden

During the Wilson ownership there was a pleasant garden with grapevine trellises at the rear and along the verandah of the eastern wing, a fernery north of the sitting room, a flower garden near the eastern wing and the boys' room, and a vegetable garden near the well. There were fruit trees west of the buildings and an orchard over near Little Street.

One approaches the homestead along the present access road and came through a big gate into the big space in the north western corner of the group of buildings. A picket fence ran from the kitchen being northwards towards the sheds and a line of trees ran along here (the present row of kurrajongs (Brachychiton populneum). There were no palm trees at that time but the pine tree (likely a Monterey pine (Pinus radiata) in the south west corner was there. The river flats south of the house (new parkland) were planted with lucerne at that time and there was apparently no fence near the house on its southern side.

A major subdivision occurred in 1930 reducing the property to 30 hectares (73 acres).

The garden today has mature Canary Island date palm (Phoenix canariensis) close to the house, mature Himalayan cedars (Cedrus deodara), English/European elm (Ulmus procera), Mediterranean chaste bush (Vitex agnus-castis).

Cottage

The original five roomed cottage was built probably between 1845 and 1850. This section of Rosedale Cottage is brick construction on a sandstone base course. Sandstone quoins have been used at the corners and reveals to openings. Heads, sills and the verandah is sandstone, the latter flagged on a sandstone base course. The roof structure is timber – originally shingled and later covered with corrugated iron. The eaves have a fascia and boxed soffit of boards with a ventilation space. Internal walls are constructed of brick, which are plastered and papered. The floors are timber boards and ceilings include metal tiles and sheets, lath and plaster, fibrous plaster, and tongue and groove boarding.

1883–1935 major changes occurred. The family was large employed several servants and entertained a great deal. In 1932 the family donated the southern part of the property for a park, known as "Wilson Park" and land for the "Wilson Memorial Hospital". Most of the extensions and renovations appear to have been carried out during this time. The two major additions were of timber-framed construction on wooden stumps. The first extension (probably in the 1890s) is thought to be the bay window which enlarge the room, apparently used as a sitting room. The dining room was added, together with the middle verandah. The kitchen block was connected to the dining room by a covered way.

The second addition, the eastern wing, was thought to have been built c. 1901. The detached timber building just north of the new dining room was built beside the kitchen block and used as a dormitory by the five sons. It was known as the boy's room. Other buildings include meat house near the old dining room fireplace, an office east of the boys' room, a dairy room and a small room known as "the factory" which was used for making preserves. Further to the north were a hayshed, a shed for two or three buggies, stables, a woolshed, milking bails, poultry shed and associated stockyards.

=== Modifications and dates ===
Land

- 1840 – 300 hectares (740 acres)
- 1930 – subdivided and reduced to 12 hectares (30 acres)
- 1932 – the family donated the southern part of the property for a park, known as "Wilson Park" and land for the "Wilson Memorial Hospital".

Cottage

The original roof was shingled and later covered with corrugated iron.

Between 1883 and 1935 major changes occurred. Most of the extensions and renovations appear to have been carried out during this time. The two major additions were of timber-ramed construction on wooden stumps. The first extension (probably in the 1890s) is thought to be the bay window which enlarged the room, apparently used as a sitting room. The dining room was added, together with the middle verandah. The kitchen block was connected to the dining room by a covered way.

The second addition, the eastern wing, was thought to have been built c. 1901. The detached timber building just north of the new dining room was built beside the kitchen block and used as a dormitory by the five sons. It was known as the boy's room. Other buildings include meat house near the old dining room fireplace, an office east of the boys' room, a dairy room and a small room known as "the factory" which was used for making preserves. Further to the north were a hayshed, a shed for two or three buggies, stables, a woolshed, milking bails, poultry shed and associated stockyards.

Under the ownership of the Parkin family a new kitchen and entrance were built between the dining room and the bay window room and the earlier kitchen block was demolished. The small bedroom in the old brick part of the house was converted to a bathroom. The eastern wing was converted int a self-contained flat. The western end of the boys' room was converted into a laundry and a new meathouse was built just north of the boys' room. palm trees were planted during this period. The cellar-like enclosure under the east.

== Heritage listing ==
Rosedale Cottage was listed on the New South Wales State Heritage Register on 2 April 1999.
