= Thersites kaputarensis =

Scientific classification
- Kingdom: Animalia
- Phylum: Mollusca
- Class: Gastropoda
- Order: Stylommatophora
- Family: Camaenidae
- Genus: Thersites
- Species: T. kaputarensis

Binomial name
- Thersites kaputarensis Zhang & Köhler, 2025

Species of gastropod

Thersites kaputarensis is a species of large, air-breathing land snail, a terrestrial gastropod mollusc in the family Camaenidae. It is endemic to New South Wales, Australia, and is known from the Mount Kaputar region.

The species was formally described in 2025 by Guoyi Zhang and Frank Köhler as part of a taxonomic revision of the Australian land-snail genus Thersites.

== Taxonomy ==
Before its formal description, the species had been referred to as Camaenidae NE27 by Murphy and Shea in 2015 and as Thersites sp. "MtKaputar" by Murphy and colleagues in 2019.

The holotype, AM C.615708, is deposited in the Australian Museum and was collected at Mount Kaputar, New South Wales, at approximately 30.29°S, 150.17°E. Additional specimens, including paratypes, are also held by the Australian Museum.

== Description ==
The shell is trochoidal-globose and brownish, with an open umbilicus and without spiral bands. The body whorl is rounded. The protoconch is smooth, while the teleoconch bears fine radial wrinkles and ridgelets. The aperture is reflected and the callus is distinct.

The shell measures 16.8–23.1 mm (0.66–0.91 in) in height and 22.5–28.2 mm (0.89–1.11 in) in width, with a shell height-to-width ratio of 0.77–0.82.

In the reproductive anatomy, the flagellum has a sharp tip and measures 3.3–3.6 mm (0.130–0.142 in) in length. The distal portion of the epiphallus measures 4.7–4.8 mm (0.185–0.189 in).

== Distribution ==
Thersites kaputarensis is known from the Mount Kaputar region of inland northern New South Wales. The species occurs west of the Great Dividing Range, in a more xeric environment than that occupied by many other members of Thersites.

The lineage was originally detected during surveys of land-snail diversity in drier sclerophyll woodland in central-eastern New South Wales.

== Etymology ==
The specific epithet kaputarensis refers to Mount Kaputar, the type locality of the species.
