= Thersites richmondiana =

Scientific classification
- Kingdom: Animalia
- Phylum: Mollusca
- Class: Gastropoda
- Order: Stylommatophora
- Family: Camaenidae
- Genus: Thersites
- Species: T. richmondiana

Binomial name
- Thersites richmondiana (Reeve, 1852)

Synonyms
- Helix richmondiana Reeve, 1852; Helix richmondiana f. decolorata Pilsbry, 1890; Annakelea tympanum Iredale, 1937; Thersites darlingtoni Clench & Archer, 1938

Species of gastropod

Thersites richmondiana is a species of large, air-breathing land snail, a terrestrial gastropod mollusc in the family Camaenidae. It is native to eastern Australia and is the type species of the genus Thersites.

A 2025 taxonomic revision of Thersites, integrating genome-scale molecular data and morphological characters, retained T. richmondiana as a distinct species and treated Thersites darlingtoni as its junior synonym.

== Taxonomy ==
The species was originally described by Lovell Augustus Reeve in 1852 as Helix richmondiana, based on material from the Richmond River, Australia. Three syntypes are held in the Natural History Museum, London.

Several subsequently described taxa are currently regarded as synonyms of T. richmondiana. Helix richmondiana f. decolorata Pilsbry, 1890 was described from the Richmond River. Annakelea tympanum Iredale, 1937 was described from Mount Tamborine, while Thersites darlingtoni Clench & Archer, 1938 was described from the MacPherson Ranges.

Thersites darlingtoni was previously recognized as a separate species. In their 2025 revision of the genus, Zhang, Cassis and Köhler treated it as a junior synonym of T. richmondiana based on integrated phylogenetic and morphological evidence.

== Description ==
Thersites richmondiana has a closed umbilicus and an angulated shell periphery. Shell height ranges from 35.4 to 54.6 mm and shell width from 48.6 to 81.9 mm, with a shell height-to-width ratio of 0.55–0.89.

In most examined specimens, the tip of the flagellum is blunt. The flagellum measures 5.1–16.7 mm, while the distal portion of the epiphallus measures 11.0–24.2 mm.

The shell is generally large and depressed to globose, with a conspicuously angulated or keeled body whorl.

== Distribution ==
Thersites richmondiana occurs in subtropical eastern Australia, principally in north-eastern New South Wales and south-eastern Queensland. Its documented localities include the Richmond River region, Mount Tamborine and the MacPherson Ranges.

Following the synonymization of T. darlingtoni, populations formerly assigned to that species are included within the distribution of T. richmondiana.
