= Wilson Memorial Community Hospital =

New South Wales Hospital

Wilson Memorial Community Hospital located in Murrurundi, New South Wales, was designed by architect George McRae and completed in 1919 . It is now proposed to be demolished to make way for a new hospital. Community groups have been fighting to get the hospital heritage listed.

== History ==
The hospital grounds was owned by Peter Haydon in 1840 who sold the land to William Arlington Wilson. The hospital replaced a smaller facility run by the Benevolent Society in 1861 It was named after William Arlington Wilson who donated the land. After he died in 1913 he gave five acres of land to community to build the hospital.

First foundation stone was laid in 1916. The building was delayed for three year due to WWI and finally opened in 1919. The foundation stone was buried in the rose garden for the 100th anniversary.

It was designed by George McRae who designed many other buildings including Sydney's Queen Victoria Building and the Taronga Zoo. The hospital was only one of two building that he designed outside of Sydney,

== Facilitates ==
Located on corner of Paradise and O'Connell Streets. The hospital has a number of services including 24/7 emergency department, palliative care and many allied health services including physio, dietetics and baby health clinics.

== Proposed new hospital ==
The old hospital is set to be demolished to improve ambulance access, provide staff accommodation and parking. The new hospital will be named Murrurundi Wilson Memorial Hospital. Hutchies construction was awarded the contract in December 2019

== Fight for State Heritage Listing ==
Ray Haynes the heritage consultant campaigned to cancel the demolition and place the hospital on the State Heritage List. On the 7th of July the State Heritage Committee rejected the Upper Hunter Shire Council application to make the hospital a state heritage building. A Murrurundi community group resubmitted an application for State Heritage listing.

The council claims no is asbestos and leaks to the building but this only in the extensions with the core building having no issues. Hunter New England Health claim that there is no integrity to the original building
