= Coolaburragundy River =

River in Australia

Coordinates: 31°52′S 149°44′E

Coolaburragundy River Coolah Creek
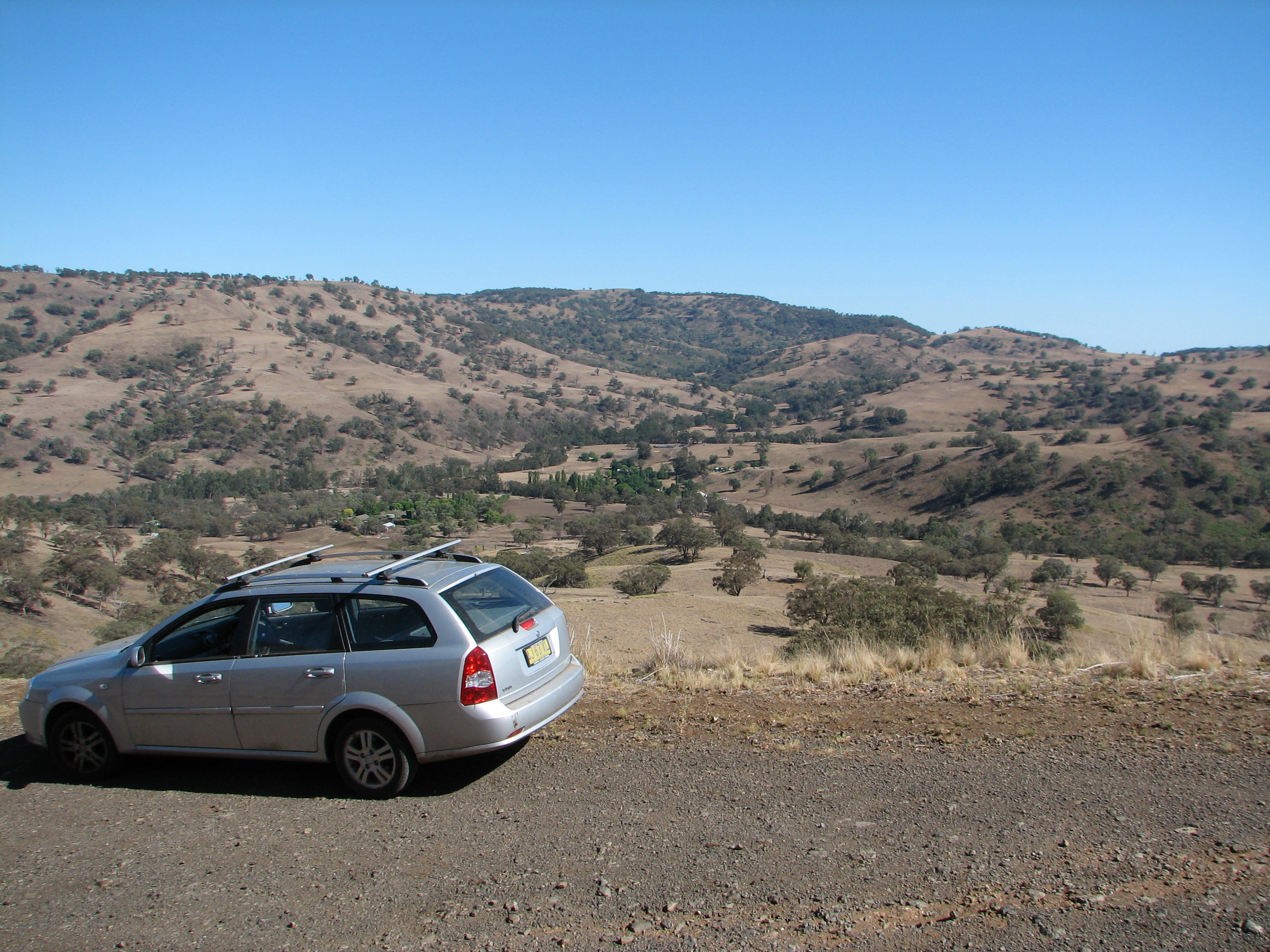
- Upper valley of Coolaburragundy River, near Coolah

Location
- Country: Australia
- State: New South Wales
- Region: IBRA: Brigalow Belt South
- District: Orana
- Municipality: Warrumbungle

Physical characteristics
- Source: Liverpool Range and Great Dividing Range
  - location: Pandoras Pass, north-east of Coolah
  - elevation: 656 m (2,152 ft)
- Mouth: confluence with the Talbragar River
  - location: near Leadville
  - elevation: 286 m (938 ft)
- Length: 68.9 km (42.8 mi)

Basin features
- River system: Murray–Darling basin

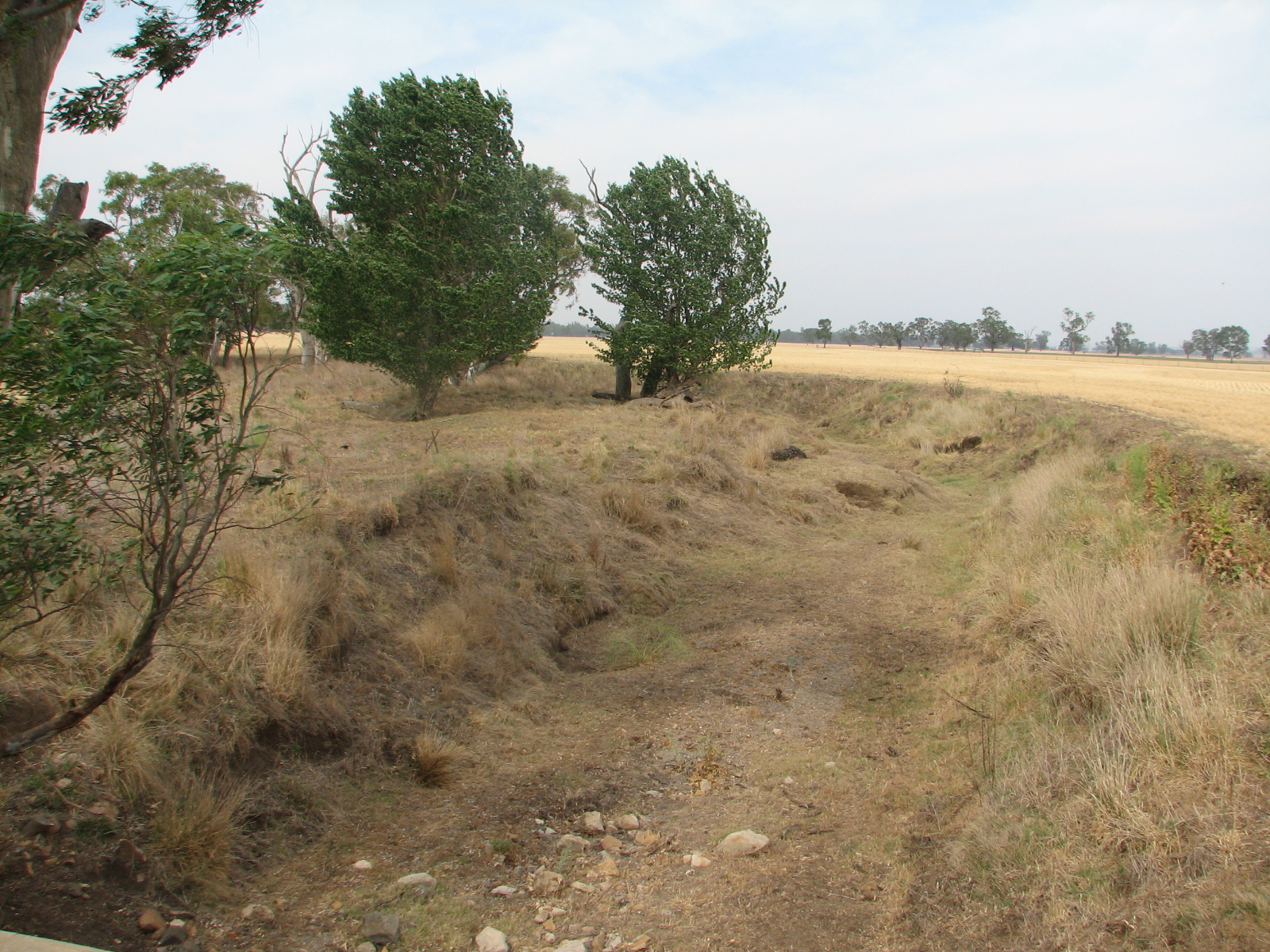
Coolaburragundy River, near Leadville.

Coolaburragundy River, a perennial stream that is part of the Talbragar catchment within the Murray–Darling basin, is located in the Orana district of New South Wales, Australia.

The river rises on the south-western slopes of the Liverpool Range, at the junction of the Great Dividing Range, about 15 kilometres (9.3 mi) north-east of the town of Coolah at Pandoras Pass. Runoff from Coolah Tops National Park also flows into the river, as it flows generally south westerly and is joined by three minor tributaries, before reaching its mouth at the confluence with the Talbragar River near Leadville; dropping 265 metres (869 ft) over its course of 69 kilometres (43 mi).

There is sufficient water for limited irrigated cropping on the fertile alluvial soils along the valley. Although the river itself is usually dry, an aquifer lies below the Coolaburragundy valley between Coolah and Dunedoo.

The Craboon-Coolah branch off the Gwabegar railway line, closed in c. 1982, ran close to the Coolaburragundy River throughout its length.

== See also ==
- List of rivers of Australia
- Rivers of New South Wales
