= Old Police Station and Courthouse, Coolah =

Old Police Station and Courthouse
- Location within New South Wales Location within Australia
- 31°49′31″S 149°43′10″E
- Location: 74 Binnia Street, Coolah, Warrumbungle Shire, New South Wales, Australia

History
- Built: 1878–1880

Site notes
- Architect: NSW Colonial Architect James Barnet

New South Wales Heritage Register
- Official name: Old Police Station & Courthouse
- Type: State heritage (built)
- Designated: 2 April 1999
- Reference no.: 48
- Type: Police station
- Category: Law Enforcement
- Builders: Henry S. Winter

The Old Police Station and Courthouse is a heritage-listed former police station and courthouse located at 74 Binnia Street, Coolah, in the Central West region of New South Wales, Australia. It was designed by the Colonial Architect of New South Wales, James Barnet, and built from 1878 to 1880 by Henry S. Winter. It was added to the New South Wales State Heritage Register on 2 April 1999.

== History ==
The small building, when constructed in 1878-1880, housed the combined functions of court house, police station, lockup and police residence. It was designed by the Colonial Architect, James Barnet and built by Henry S. Winter.

Some alterations, designed by the office of the Government Architect, Walter Liberty Vernon, were carried out in 1898 by the builder J. T. Saunders of Merriwa and consisted of the conversion of old cells to bedrooms for the residence and the construction of new cells and yard. Some additional minor alterations were carried out between that time and 1930 by the Government Architect of the day, none of which detracted from the architectural significance of the building.

In 1979 Coolah Shire Council requested the making of a conservation order over the Old Police Station and Courthouse. As a new police station and a new police sergeant's residence had already been built on another site in Coolah, plans were being made for its disposal.

The Department of Public Works and Services supported the making of a conservation order in respect of the building.

On 28 March 1980 a permanent conservation order was placed over the property.

In 1987 the Department of Public Works invited tenders for the purchase of the property.

It was transferred to the State Heritage Register on 2 April 1999.

== Description ==
The building is of Colonial style architecture. It is constructed of brick with some stone and a galvanised iron roof.

It retains a good state of architectural integrity.

== Heritage listing ==
As at 3 October 2000, the building, completed in 1880, was one of the few examples remaining from the Victorian era of a small combined police and court building. It was designed by the eminent Colonial Architect, James Barnet, and retains a good state of architectural integrity, as one of the oldest public buildings in the town of Coolah.

The Old Police Station & Courthouse was listed on the New South Wales State Heritage Register on 2 April 1999 having satisfied the following criteria.

The place is important in demonstrating the course, or pattern, of cultural or natural history in New South Wales.

Completed in 1880, the building is one of the few examples remaining from the Victorian era of a small combined Police and Court building. It was designed by the eminent Colonial Architect, James Barnet, and is one of the oldest public buildings in the town of Coolah.

== See also ==
- Australian non-residential architectural styles
