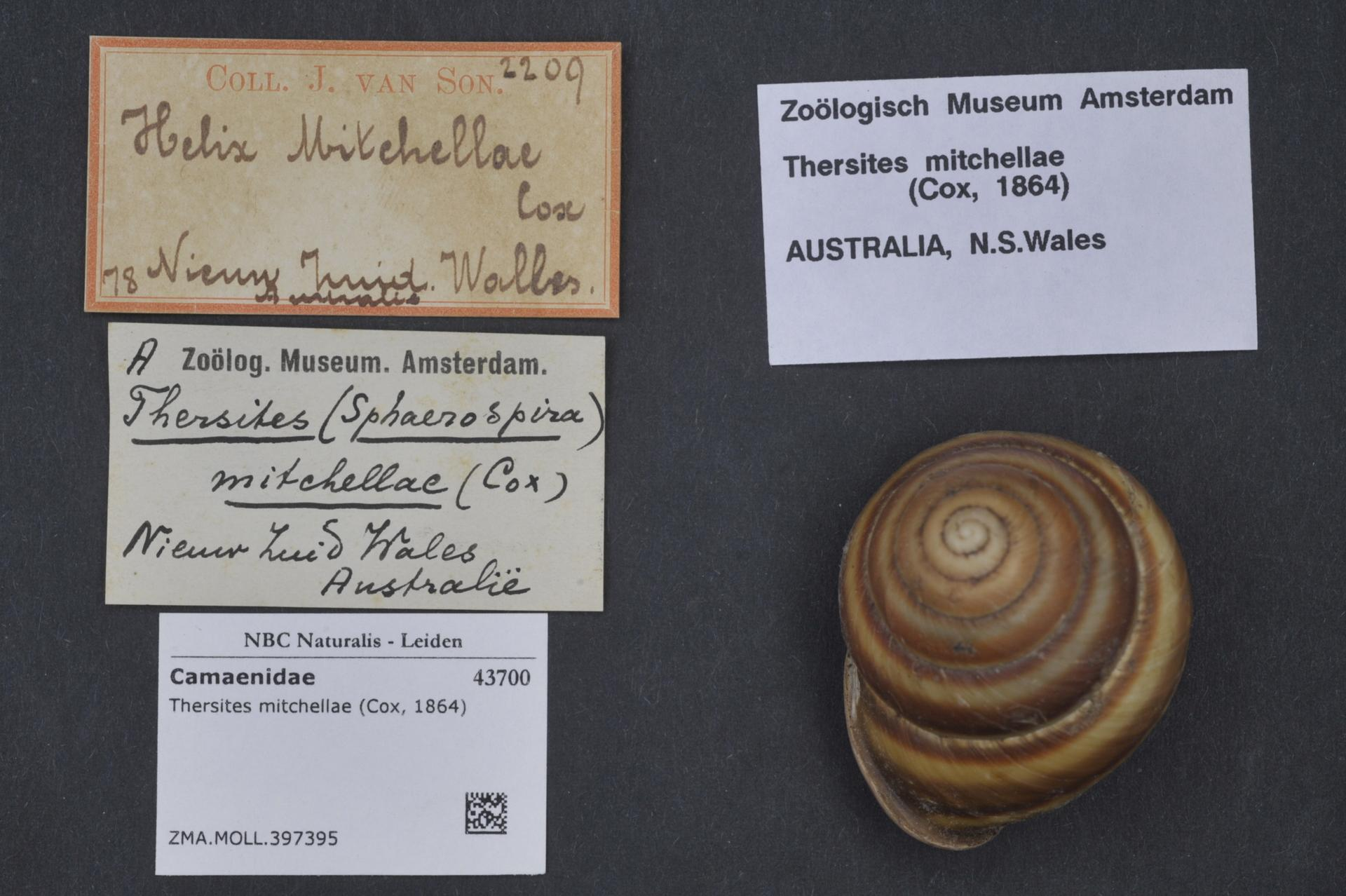
- Shell historically identified as Thersites mitchellae, now considered a synonym of T. novaehollandiae

Scientific classification
- Kingdom: Animalia
- Phylum: Mollusca
- Class: Gastropoda
- Order: Stylommatophora
- Family: Camaenidae
- Subfamily: Hadrinae
- Genus: Thersites; Pfeiffer, 1855

= Thersites (gastropod) =

Genus of gastropods

Thersites is a genus of large, air-breathing land snails, terrestrial pulmonate gastropod molluscs in the family Camaenidae.

== Species ==
Species within the genus Thersites include:

- Thersites darlingtoni _{Clench & Archer, 1938, synonym of Thersites richmondiana (Reeve, 1852)}
- Thersites mitchellae _{(Cox, 1864), synonym of Thersites novaehollandiae (Gray, 1834)}
- Thersites novaehollandiae _{(Gray, 1834)}
- Thersites richmondiana _{(Reeve, 1852)}
- Thersites kaputarensis _{Zhang & Köhler, 2025}
- Thersites coolahensis _{Zhang & Köhler, 2025}

== Phylogenetics ==
A genome-scale phylogenetic analysis of Thersites published by Zhang, Cassis and Köhler in 2025 recovered four principal species-level lineages within the genus. Phylogenetic relationships were reconstructed from genome-wide SNP data using maximum likelihood, maximum parsimony and Bayesian inference.

The analyses identified two major lineages that also differ in the morphology of the umbilicus. One lineage, comprising T. kaputarensis and T. coolahensis, is characterized by an open umbilicus, whereas the lineage containing T. novaehollandiae and T. richmondiana has a closed umbilicus.

The molecular phylogeny also showed that the previously recognized species boundaries did not consistently correspond to monophyletic groups. In particular, specimens assigned to T. mitchellae were nested within the broader lineage of T. novaehollandiae, while T. darlingtoni was nested within T. richmondiana. To maintain monophyletic species, Zhang, Cassis and Köhler therefore synonymized T. mitchellae with T. novaehollandiae and T. darlingtoni with T. richmondiana. Two genetically and morphologically distinct inland lineages were described as the new species T. kaputarensis and T. coolahensis.

The resulting classification recognizes four species within Thersites:

- Thersites
  - - T. kaputarensis
    - T. coolahensis
  - - T. novaehollandiae
    - T. richmondiana
