= Willow Tree railway station =

Railway station in New South Wales, Australia

Willow Tree
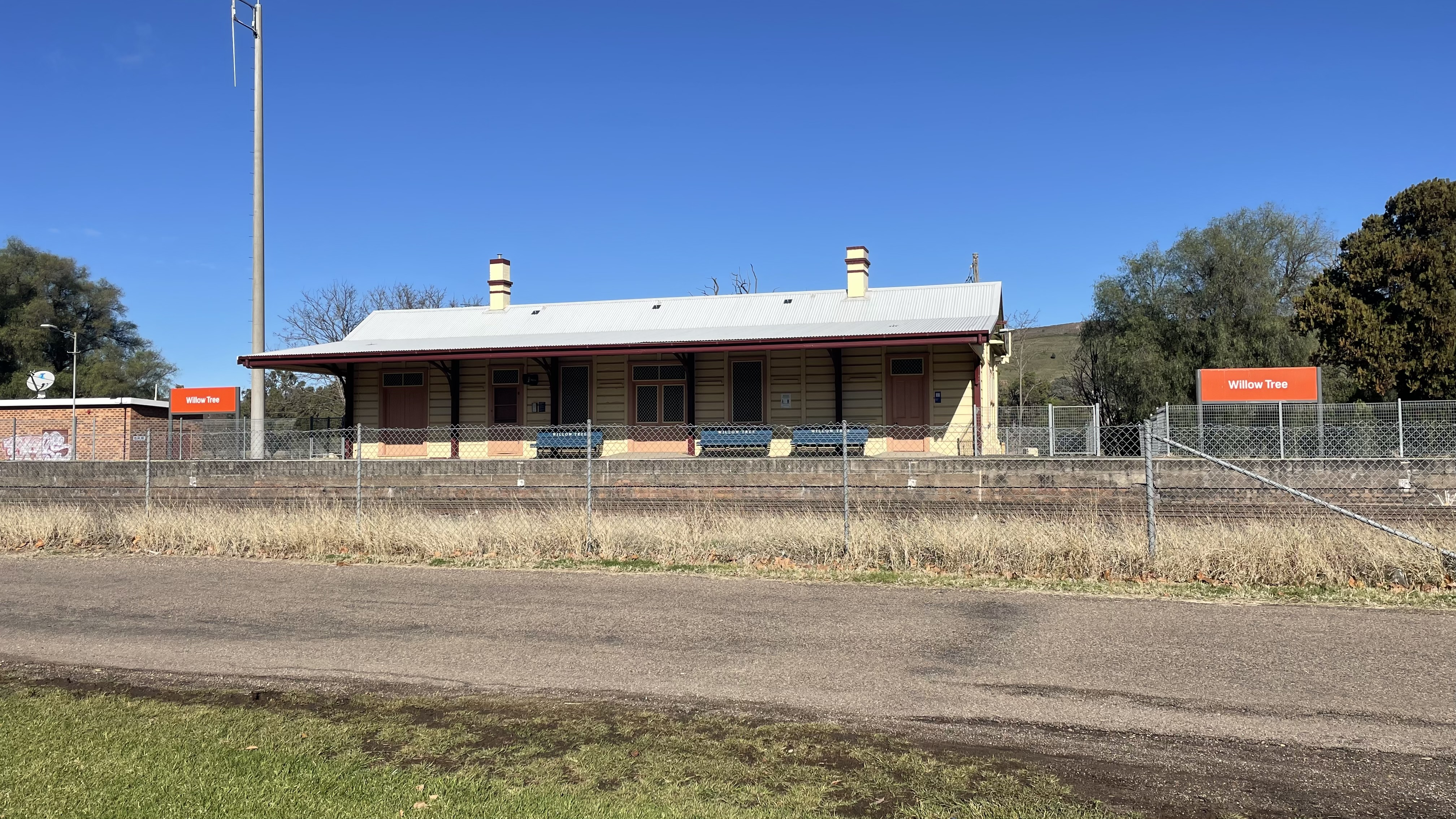
- Station building in June 2024

General information
- Location: Cadell Street, Willow Tree; Australia
- Coordinates: 31°39′00″S 150°43′34″E
- Owner: Transport Asset Manager of New South Wales
- Operator: NSW TrainLink
- Line: Main Northern
- Distance: 375.70 kilometres (233.45 mi) from Central
- Platforms: 1
- Tracks: 2

Construction
- Structure type: Ground
- Accessible: Yes

Other information
- Station code: WTE
- Website: Transport for NSW

History
- Opened: 13 August 1877
- Former names: Warrah (1877–1879)

Services
Preceding station	NSW TrainLink	Following station
Quirindi towards Moree or Armidale	NSW TrainLink North Western Line	Murrurundi towards Sydney
Location

Willow Tree railway station is located on the Main Northern line in New South Wales, Australia. It serves the village of Willow Tree, opening on 13 August 1877 as Warrah when the line was extended from Murrururundi to Quirindi. It was renamed Willow Tree in 1879.

The station has one platform and a passing loop. It had a locomotive turntable, primarily for bank engines used on the steeply graded banks over the Liverpool Range to Ardglen Tunnel south of the village. Aurizon and Pacific National still use bank locomotives on some services today.

== Services ==
Willow Tree is served by NSW TrainLink's daily Northern Tablelands Xplorer service operating between Armidale/Moree and Sydney. Due to the length of the platform, only the Moree section of the train stops on the platform. This station is a request stop, so the train only stops here if passengers have booked to board/alight here.

Platform	Line	Stopping pattern	Notes
1	North Western Region	Services to Sydney, Armidale & Moree	request stop (booked passengers only)

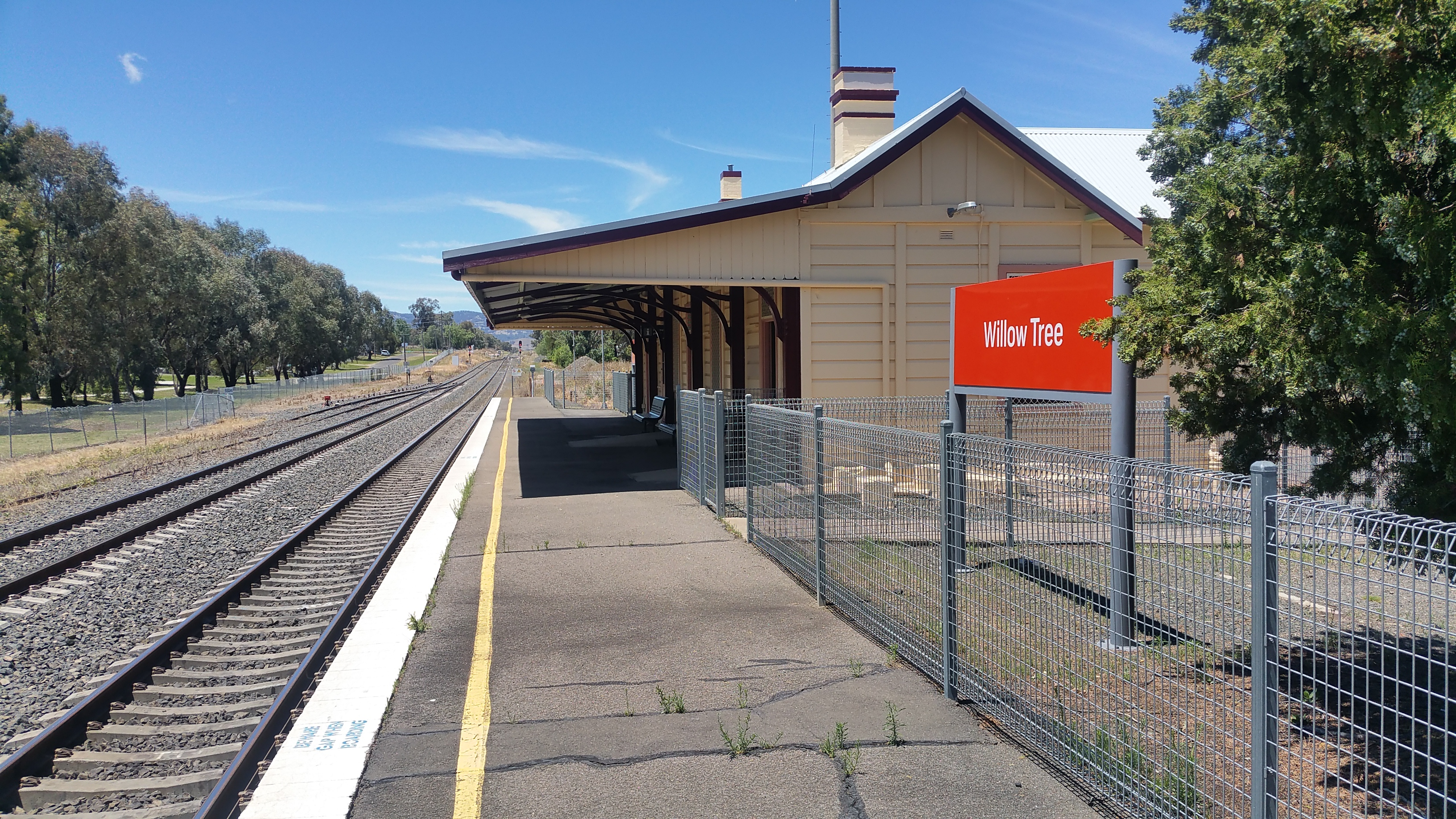
Southbound view on the platform

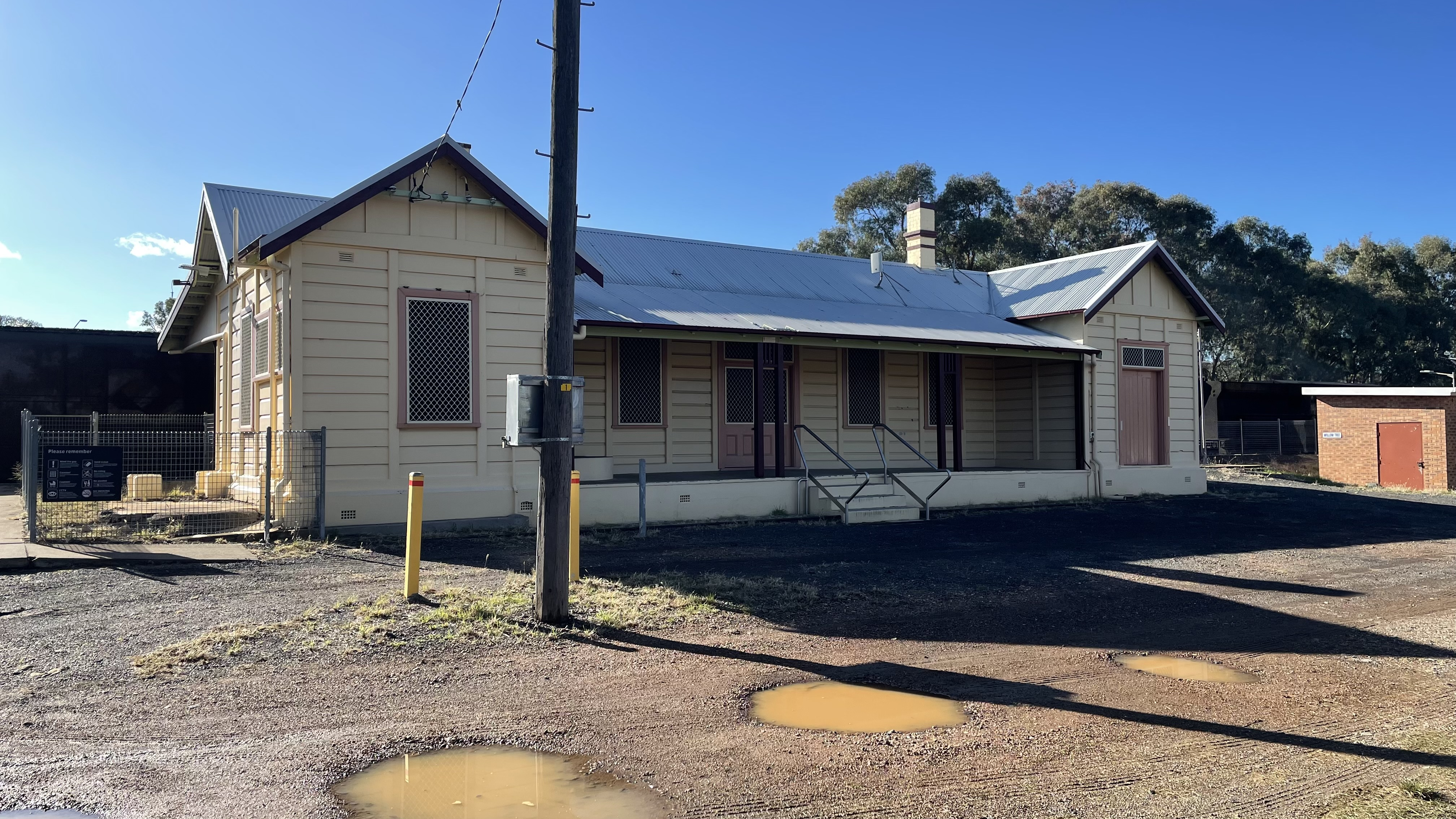
Station building seen from entrance
