= Coolah railway line =

Former railway line in New South Wales, Australia

Overview
- Status: Closed
- Termini: Craboon; Coolah
- Stations: 7

Service
- System: NSW Regional Rail
- Operator: State Rail Authority

History
- Opened: 30 March 1920
- Closed: 29 January 1986

Technical
- Line length: 42.47 km (26.39 mi)
- Number of tracks: 1
- Track gauge: 1,435 mm (4 ft 8 1/2 in)

The Coolah railway line was a branch railway line in the Warrumbungle Shire of the Orana Region, located in New South Wales, Australia. It branched east towards Coolah from the Gwabegar railway line at Craboon and ran for a length of 42.47 km (26.39 mi). Regular passenger services ran for half a century, from the 1920s through to the 1970s. Since closure in the mid-1980s, the line has remained disused and the infrastructure has degraded.

== History ==
=== Construction ===
A railway was first proposed to run from Werris Creek railway station to Wellington railway station, passing through the town of Coolah, however the difficulty of the terrain along the route led to the railway proposal being cancelled. A railway line for the area was next proposed in November 1910, and an investigation carried out in April 1911 although this once again resulted in objection.

On 21 December 1915, a line from Craboon to Coolah was approved, with a targeted length of "23 miles 76 chains". Although the first sod was turned in 1916, construction didn't begin until October 1918.

In mid-1919 the Spanish influenza impacted construction of the railway, with fears that the opening of the line would be indefinitely delayed. Restrictions were placed on indoor gatherings and wearing masks became mandated in order to continue construction.

=== Opening & Services ===
The line officially opened to passenger services on 30 March 1920, with the initial trip from Craboon to Coolah taking 2 hours and 20 minutes. Although the line had opened with six stations, a new station and siding at Girragulang was constructed in November 1920 and opened the next month, to support the export of wheat and lucerne from the local 'Folly' Soldier's Settlement.

Through the 1920s and 1930s, six services were provided between Craboon and Coolah, with request stops at all stations except for Craboon, Leadville and Coolah. Services provided were mixed passenger and goods, running as goods-only from Mudgee to Craboon where passengers would then be allowed on. In 1938, an increase in wool and wheat farming resulted in the introduction of more freight services to transport the goods towards larger population centres, which could then be shipped.

By the late-1960s, two services were provided twice a week on Wednesday and Sunday and were operated by goods trains with passenger capabilities. These services were operated between Mudgee and Coolah, stopping only at Gulgong before reaching Craboon. By this time, Leadville was no longer called at by all trains, as it had become a request stop.

=== Closure ===
From opening, the Coolah line generally faced losses of income due to lower than anticipated goods and passenger transportation along the line. Regular passenger services ceased in 1975 with the closure of the remaining stations between Craboon and Coolah, as part of the larger rail network rationalisation occurring in New South Wales during the latter half of the 20th century. The last official passenger train ran along the line on 27 February 1982, and the line closed on 29 January 1986. Since closure the line has remained disused, with the remains of the railway still visible through most sections.

== Description ==
=== Route ===
The line ran through relatively flat country, in a generally north western direction from Craboon. During construction, controversy surrounded the final proposed route of the line as it sat on a flood plain, and in July 1920 parts of the line had to be reconstructed due to flooding. Stations along the line were constructed from either timber planks or concrete, and most were located next to stockyards or adjacent to passing loops.

=== Locomotives ===
Between 1920 and the early-1940s, Z23 class locomotives (formerly O.446 class) were regularly used for movements along the line. These were replaced by C30T class locomotives. After the 1950s, steam locomotives were replaced by those powered by diesel, remaining until the closure of the line. Passenger services were operated by 600 class railcars, and goods services by 48 class diesel locomotives.
