= Liverpool Range =

Mountain range in New South Wales, Australia

Liverpool
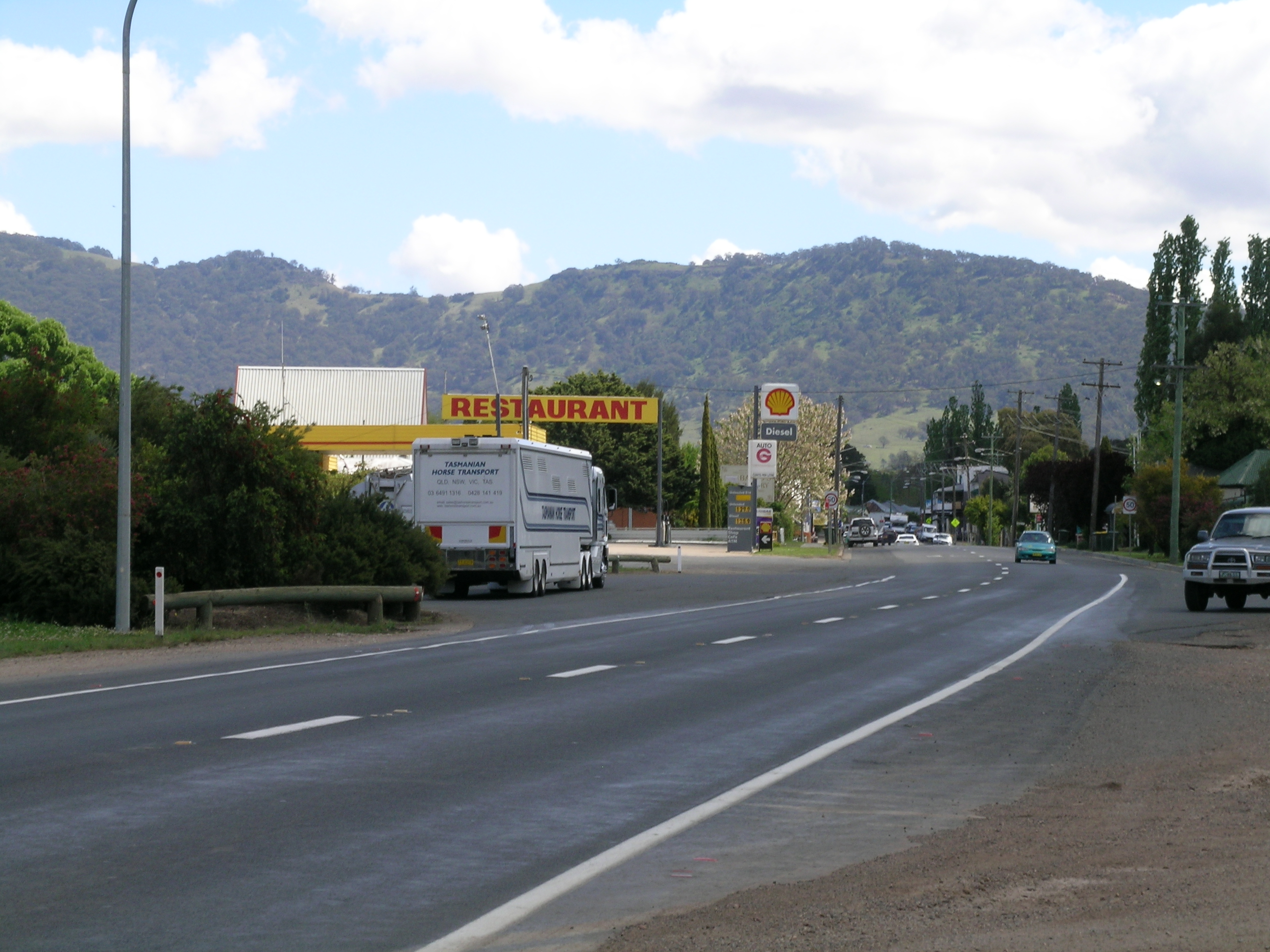
- The Liverpool Range viewed from Murrurundi

Highest point
- Elevation: 1,300 m (4,300 ft)

Dimensions
- Length: 100 km (62 mi) west

Naming
- Etymology: The Second Earl of Liverpool

Geography
- Location within New South Wales
- Country: Australia
- State: New South Wales
- Range coordinates: 32°3.2′S 151°29.6′E
- Parent range: Great Dividing Range

The Liverpool Range is a mountain range and a lava-field province in New South Wales, Australia.

The eastern peaks of the range were the traditional territory of the Wonnarua people.

== Geography ==
The Liverpool Range starts from the volcanic plateau known as the Barrington Tops and runs for about 100 kilometres (60 mi) westwards, forming the northern boundary of the Hunter Valley. Parts of the Liverpool Range form the watershed between the coastal and inland drainage of New South Wales and thus form a component of the Great Dividing Range. The western end of the Liverpool Range merges into the Warrumbungle Range.

The Liverpool Range has a reputation as a breeding ground for severe summer thunderstorms. The peaks of the range generally experience several snowfalls each winter.

== History ==
The Liverpool Range was named after Robert Banks Jenkinson, 2nd Earl of Liverpool, who was the prime minister of the United Kingdom at the time of its exploration by Europeans. The higher parts of the Liverpool Range reach approximately 1,300 metres (4,300 ft) above sea level, and the range formed a significant barrier to the expansion of settlement in the early period of British settlement in New South Wales.

The first route across the range was Pandoras Pass discovered by Allan Cunningham. This is located near the western end of the range, north from the town of Coolah and within Coolah Tops National Park. The crossing used by the New England Highway is Nowlands Gap (otherwise known as Murrurundi Gap), which crosses the range near its east end. The Main Northern railway line from Sydney to the Queensland border crosses under this pass via the Ardglen Tunnel.

The southern slopes of the Liverpool Range are drained by the headwaters of the Hunter River and its tributaries, such as the Pages River, which flows through the town of Murrurundi. The northern slopes are drained by the headwaters of the Peel River and the Mooki River. The Talbragar River and the Coolaburragundy River also rise on the range and flow south-west, joining near the town of Dunedoo.
