= Pages River =

Coordinates: 32°08′04″S 150°55′42″E

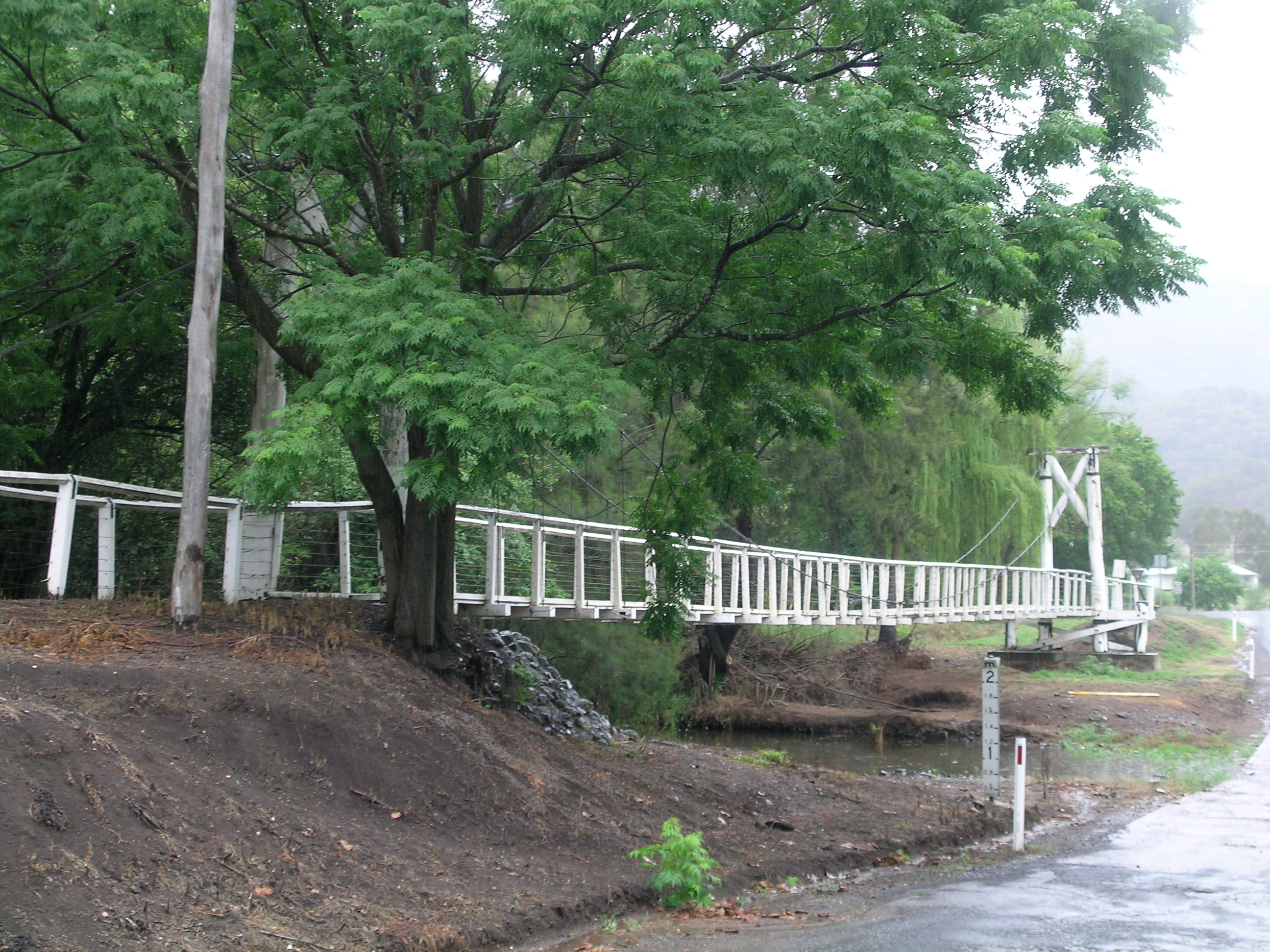
- Pages River at Murrurundi

Location
- Country: Australia
- State: New South Wales
- Region: NSW North Coast (IBRA), Upper Hunter
- Local government area: Upper Hunter Shire
- Towns: Murrurundi, Blandford, Gundy

Physical characteristics
- Source: Great Dividing Range
  - location: below Mount Gregson, southwest of Murrurundi
  - elevation: 1,100 m (3,600 ft)
- Mouth: confluence with the Hunter River
  - location: downstream of Glenbawn Dam
  - elevation: 174 m (571 ft)
- Length: 97 km (60 mi)

Basin features
- River system: Hunter River catchment
- Tributaries
  - left: Warlands Creek, Scotts Creek (New South Wales), Isis River
  - right: Kewell Creek, Glen Creek (New South Wales)

Pages River, a perennial river of the Hunter River catchment, is located in the Hunter region of New South Wales, Australia.

== Course and features ==
The Pages River rises on the eastern slopes of the Great Dividing Range below Mount Gregson, southwest of Murrurundi, and flows generally east northeast, then southeast, and then south southwest before reaching its confluence with the Hunter River downstream of Glenbawn Dam. The river descends 923 metres (3,028 ft) over its 97-kilometre (60 mi) course.

== See also ==
- Rivers of New South Wales
- List of rivers of Australia
- List of rivers of New South Wales (L–Z)
