= Talbragar River =

Coordinates: 32°12′S 148°37′E

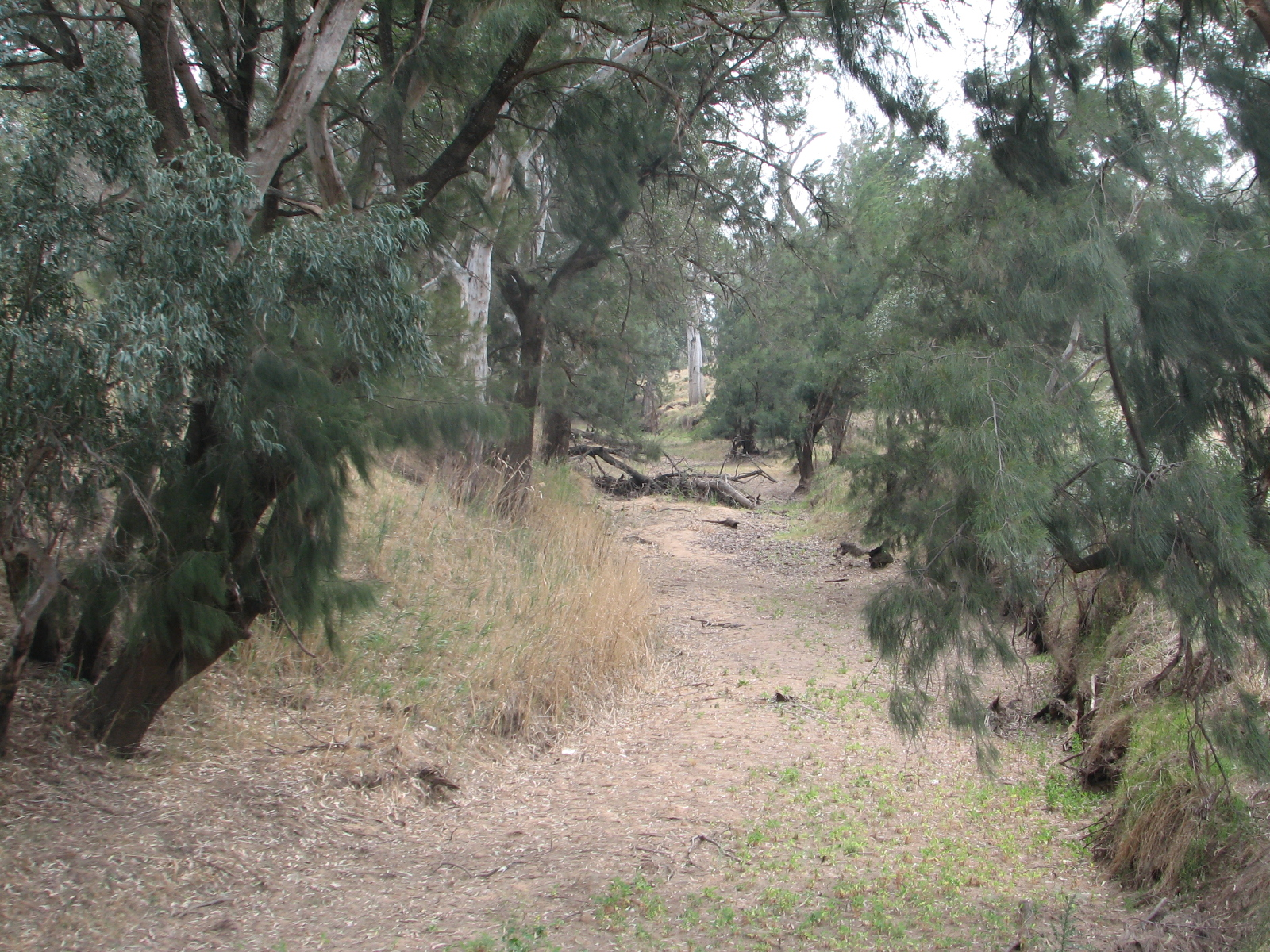
- Talbragar River, at Cobbora, southwest of Dunedoo

Location
- Country: Australia
- State: New South Wales
- Region: IBRA: Brigalow Belt South
- District: Upper Hunter, Orana
- Municipalities: Upper Hunter, Warrumbungle, Dubbo

Physical characteristics
- Source: Liverpool Range, Great Dividing Range
  - location: north of Cassilis
  - elevation: 1,130 m (3,710 ft)
- Mouth: confluence with the Macquarie River
  - location: near Dubbo
  - elevation: 258 m (846 ft)
- Length: 277 km (172 mi)

Basin features
- River system: Macquarie River, Murray–Darling basin
- Tributaries
  - right: Coolaburragundy River

Talbragar River, a perennial stream that is part of the Macquarie catchment within the Murray–Darling basin, is located in the Orana district of New South Wales, Australia.

The river rises on the western side of the Liverpool Range on south slopes of Great Dividing Range, north of Cassilis and flows generally south west, joined by fifteen tributaries, including the Coolaburragundy River, and reaching its confluence with the Macquarie River near Dubbo, descending 876 metres (2,874 ft) over its 277 kilometres (172 mi) course.

The river flows through the Dunedoo and is noted for its influence on flood, particularly for its capacity for rapid rise and fall, due to the wide catchment, and the effect of its flood water on Dubbo.

== European history ==
The Talbragar River was first encountered by Europeans in the late 1820s when it was called the Putterbatta River. The first bridge over the Talbragar was built in the 1850s, near Dunedoo, by Thomas New.

== See also ==
- Rivers of New South Wales
- List of rivers of Australia
- Talbragar fossil site
