= Murrurundi =

- Town
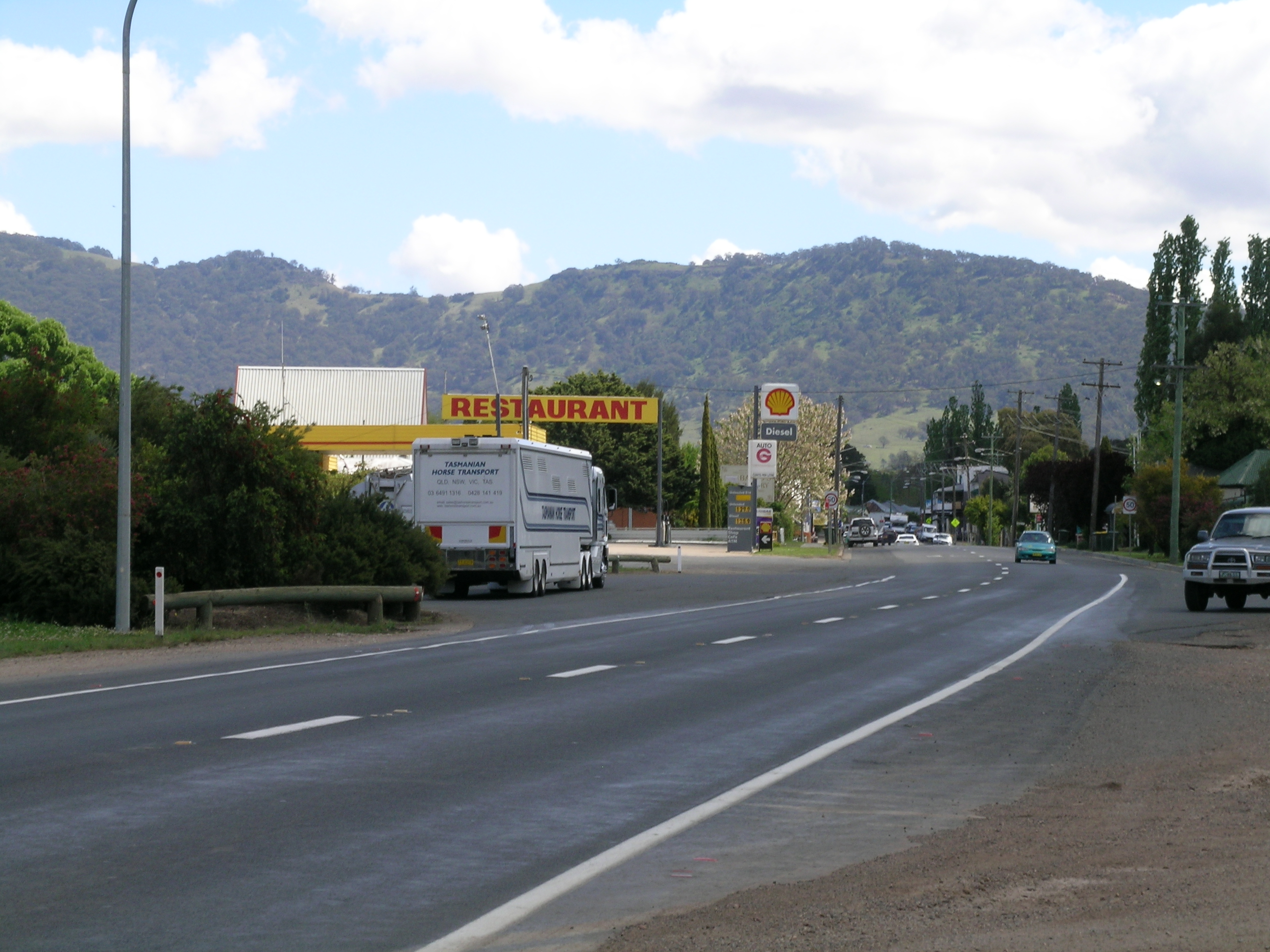
- The New England Highway at Murrurundi, with the Liverpool Range in the background

- Coordinates: 31°45′S 150°50′E
- Country: Australia
- State: New South Wales
- LGA: Upper Hunter Shire
- Location: 309 km (192 mi) N of Sydney; 193 km (120 mi) NW of Newcastle; 40 km (25 mi) N of Scone; 91 km (57 mi) S of Tamworth
- Established: 1840
- Elevation: 467 m (1,532 ft)

Population
  - Total: 822 (2021 census)
- Postcode: 2338
- Mean max temp: 23.4 °C (74.1 °F)
- Mean min temp: 8.5 °C (47.3 °F)
- Annual rainfall: 829.7 mm (32.67 in)

Murrurundi (/mʌruːrʌndaɪ/ MURR-oo-RUN-dye) is a rural town located in the Upper Hunter Shire, in the Upper Hunter region of New South Wales, Australia.

Murrurundi is situated 193 kilometres (120 mi) northwest by road from Newcastle and 309 kilometres (192 mi) north of Sydney. At the 2021 census, the town had a population of 822. The town is almost completely surrounded by mountains of the Liverpool Range, and is located on the Pages River, a tributary of the Hunter River.

== History and overview ==
Before European settlement, the Murrurundi district was home to the Wanaruah and possibly the Kamilaroi Aboriginal people. The name "Murrurundi" is often erroneously thought to come from an Aboriginal word meaning "nestling in the valley". It does in fact mean "five fingers", a representation of the rock formation visible at the northern end of the township.

European settlement of the area began in the 1820s, and the town itself was established by the New South Wales government in 1840. In the same year, a local landholder, Thomas Haydon, established an adjacent private township called Haydonton. In the 1846 census, Murrurundi had a population of 52, while Haydonton had a total of 117. In 1913, the two neighbouring settlements were merged to create the modern-day town of Murrurundi.

Benjamin Hall, father of bushranger Ben Hall had a small farm in a valley near Murrurundi in 1839. He opened a butcher's shop at Haydonton in 1842. Ben Hall lived at Murrurundi with his family until the age of 13.

Oil shale (kerosene shale) was mined at Mount Temi, some 11.25 kilometres (6.99 mi) to the north of Murrurundi from 1886, but lay dormant for many years. The mine was revived in 1910, by British Australian Oil Company, and a railway was constructed from Temple Court, 1.2 kilometres (0.75 mi) west of Murrurundi, to the terminal of an aerial ropeway bringing shale from the mine. Operations ceased during the First World War.

In July 1910, a lion, two lionesses and two Russian wolves escaped from Wirth's Circus.

Murrurundi is the nearest major town to the site of the Murulla rail accident, which occurred on 13 September 1926, and killed 27 people when runaway wagons smashed into a mail train.

Annual events include the rodeo and the King of the Ranges stockman challenge. There are only a few sporting facilities due to the low population. These sports are senior rugby league, touch football, swimming club and cricket.

Murrurundi was the main town of the former Murrurundi Shire local government area, which was abolished and its territory divided between two new, larger, shires. The town of Murrurundi is now part of Upper Hunter Shire.

In January 2019, Murrurundi ran out of water making it necessary for trucks to begin daily delivery of potable water.

In October 2019 it was announced that the Wilson Memorial Community Hospital would be demolished to make away for a new hospital.

== Heritage listings ==
Murrurundi has a number of heritage-listed sites, including:

- Main Northern railway: Murrurundi railway station
- Mount Street: Rosedale Cottage

Historical population
Year	Pop.	±%
1921	1,301	—
1933	1,253	−3.7%
1947	1,039	−17.1%
1954	1,106	+6.4%
1961	1,041	−5.9%
1966	969	−6.9%
1971	926	−4.4%
1976	930	+0.4%
1981	861	−7.4%
1986	878	+2.0%
1991	983	+12.0%
1996	902	−8.2%
2001	783	−13.2%
2006	805	+2.8%
2011	847	+5.2%
2016	888	+4.8%
2021	822	−7.4%
Source: Australian Bureau of Statistics data.

== Transport ==
The New England Highway runs through the town, and it is served by a rail service.

Murrurundi railway station is located on the Main North railway line, 352 kilometres (219 mi) from Sydney. The station opened in 1872 and consists of a substantial brick station-house with a passing loop and goods yard. There was also a locomotive depot for bank engines which lasted until the end of steam. It continues to be served by a daily rail service operated by a NSW TrainLink Xplorer train to and from Sydney and Armidale/Moree, trains will only stop at this station on request.

== Climate ==
The area has two weather stations: one in the town, and another high up on the Murrurundi Gap about 5 kilometres (3 mi) to the WNW. The latter has significantly cooler maximum temperatures (even when accounting for elevation) but also warmer minima, by virtue of being an exposed hilltop.

The town station commenced rainfall records in 1870; temperature averages and extremes from 1907 and 1965, respectively; whereas the gap station was not established until 2003.

Climate data for Murrurundi (Haydon Street, 1907–2019, rainfall to 1870); 466 m AMSL; 31.77° S, 150.84° E
Month	Jan	Feb	Mar	Apr	May	Jun	Jul	Aug	Sep	Oct	Nov	Dec	Year
Record high °C (°F)	41.6 (106.9)	42.2 (108.0)	37.8 (100.0)	34.0 (93.2)	27.9 (82.2)	25.2 (77.4)	24.8 (76.6)	27.3 (81.1)	32.8 (91.0)	36.5 (97.7)	40.6 (105.1)	40.6 (105.1)	42.2 (108.0)
Mean daily maximum °C (°F)	30.8 (87.4)	29.8 (85.6)	27.8 (82.0)	23.7 (74.7)	19.2 (66.6)	15.8 (60.4)	15.2 (59.4)	17.0 (62.6)	20.7 (69.3)	24.2 (75.6)	27.3 (81.1)	29.7 (85.5)	23.4 (74.1)
Mean daily minimum °C (°F)	15.3 (59.5)	15.0 (59.0)	12.7 (54.9)	8.5 (47.3)	5.1 (41.2)	3.2 (37.8)	2.0 (35.6)	2.5 (36.5)	5.0 (41.0)	8.2 (46.8)	11.1 (52.0)	13.7 (56.7)	8.5 (47.3)
Record low °C (°F)	4.2 (39.6)	4.0 (39.2)	0.6 (33.1)	−2.9 (26.8)	−5.0 (23.0)	−6.5 (20.3)	−6.2 (20.8)	−6.5 (20.3)	−5.0 (23.0)	−1.9 (28.6)	0.0 (32.0)	1.5 (34.7)	−6.5 (20.3)
Average rainfall mm (inches)	90.2 (3.55)	76.6 (3.02)	62.5 (2.46)	52.0 (2.05)	54.2 (2.13)	69.4 (2.73)	62.7 (2.47)	61.2 (2.41)	57.2 (2.25)	72.2 (2.84)	75.9 (2.99)	90.5 (3.56)	829.7 (32.67)
Average rainy days (≥ 0.2mm)	7.4	6.4	6.2	6.0	6.7	8.8	8.2	7.9	7.0	7.7	7.9	7.9	88.1
Source: Bureau of Meteorology

Climate data for Murrurundi Gap AWS (2003–2022); 729 m AMSL; 31.74° S, 150.79° E
Month	Jan	Feb	Mar	Apr	May	Jun	Jul	Aug	Sep	Oct	Nov	Dec	Year
Record high °C (°F)	39.2 (102.6)	40.5 (104.9)	34.7 (94.5)	29.6 (85.3)	24.1 (75.4)	22.1 (71.8)	20.2 (68.4)	23.9 (75.0)	29.6 (85.3)	34.2 (93.6)	38.2 (100.8)	39.3 (102.7)	40.5 (104.9)
Mean daily maximum °C (°F)	28.5 (83.3)	27.1 (80.8)	24.3 (75.7)	20.9 (69.6)	16.7 (62.1)	12.9 (55.2)	12.5 (54.5)	14.6 (58.3)	18.3 (64.9)	21.6 (70.9)	24.3 (75.7)	26.6 (79.9)	20.7 (69.2)
Mean daily minimum °C (°F)	16.7 (62.1)	15.7 (60.3)	14.1 (57.4)	11.3 (52.3)	8.2 (46.8)	5.9 (42.6)	4.9 (40.8)	5.7 (42.3)	8.5 (47.3)	10.9 (51.6)	13.0 (55.4)	14.9 (58.8)	10.8 (51.5)
Record low °C (°F)	8.7 (47.7)	6.8 (44.2)	5.5 (41.9)	1.6 (34.9)	0.2 (32.4)	−1.9 (28.6)	−1.8 (28.8)	−2.1 (28.2)	0.4 (32.7)	1.8 (35.2)	3.7 (38.7)	5.7 (42.3)	−2.1 (28.2)
Average rainfall mm (inches)	66.6 (2.62)	70.3 (2.77)	79.2 (3.12)	32.2 (1.27)	36.4 (1.43)	65.2 (2.57)	48.5 (1.91)	42.0 (1.65)	47.4 (1.87)	56.8 (2.24)	85.2 (3.35)	86.8 (3.42)	720.9 (28.38)
Average rainy days (≥ 0.2mm)	8.6	8.5	10.2	8.6	9.2	13.4	11.4	8.5	7.3	9.2	9.8	10.6	115.3
Source: Bureau of Meteorology
