= Buses in Newcastle, New South Wales =

Public bus system in Australia

Buses in Newcastle

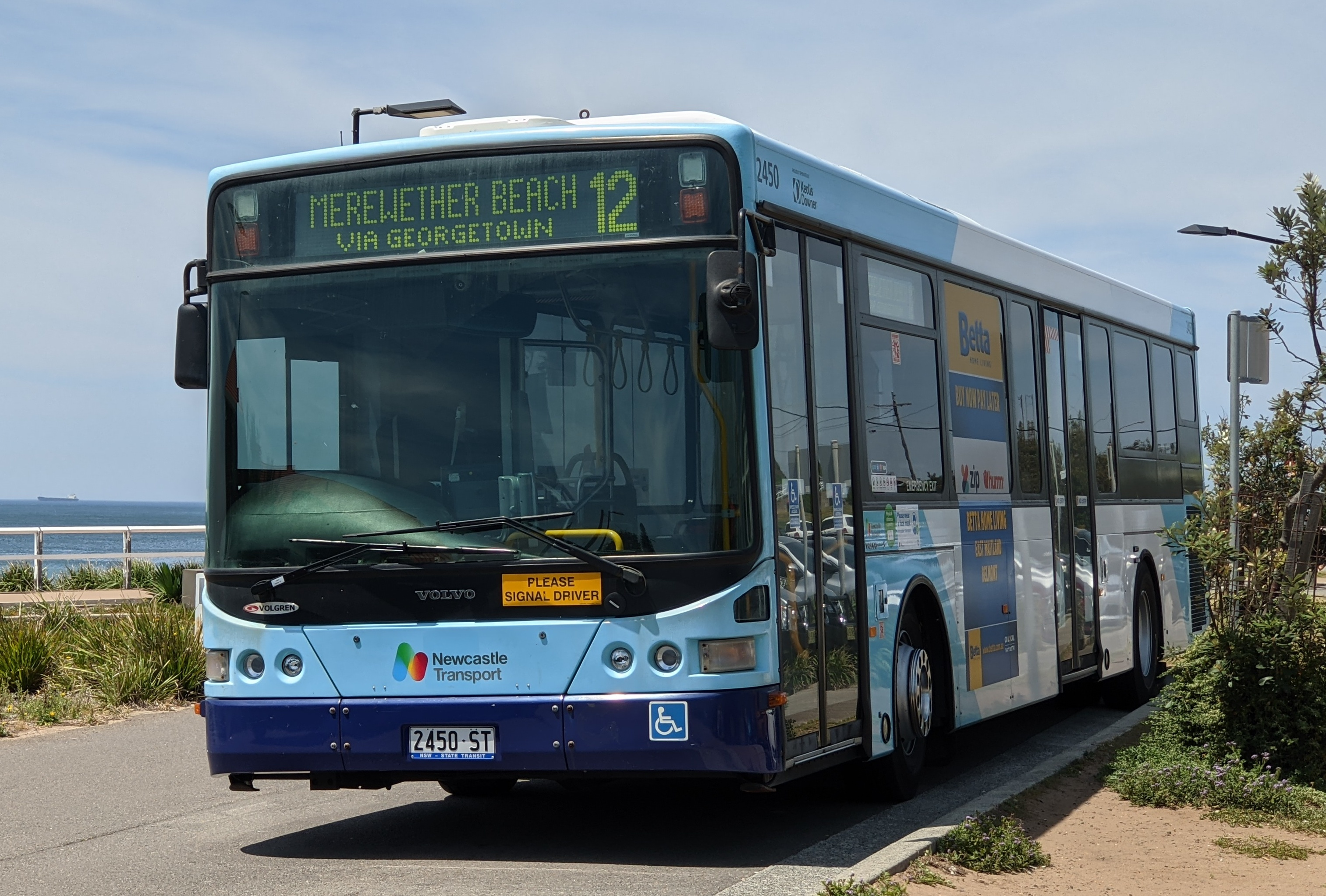
- A Newcastle Transport Volgren bodied Volvo B7RLE at Merewether Beach in November 2020

Overview
- Owner: Transport for NSW
- Locale: Newcastle
- Transit type: Bus
- Website: transportnsw.info

Operation
- Operators: Hunter Valley Buses; Newcastle Transport; Port Stephens Coaches; Rover Coaches

Newcastle bus routes connect suburbs in and around Newcastle and Lake Macquarie, about 100 kilometres (60 mi) north of Sydney.

Newcastle is the second-largest city in the state of New South Wales, serving as a regional centre for residents of the Central Coast, Hunter Valley and Great Lakes regions. Bus services within Newcastle are operated by Newcastle Transport. It also operates a ferry service across the Hunter River between Newcastle's CBD and Stockton. Hunter Valley Buses also operate many routes in the area. These two main operators have an east–west split, with Newcastle Transport buses mostly covering the inner city and coastal region east of the lake as far south as Swansea, while Hunter Valley Buses cover the region west of the lake, Newcastle Airport, and outlying suburbs and towns, extending into the valley. Port Stephens Coaches serve the airport and coast north of Newcastle.

The network is overseen by Transport for NSW, with the Opal card ticketing system valid for most journeys. Newcastle consists of five outer metropolitan bus regions for the purposes of contracting arrangements (regions OSMBSC 1 to 4 and NISC 1).

Busways, Greyhound Australia, NSW TrainLink, Port Stephens Coaches, Premier Motor Service, Rover Coaches and Sid Fogg's also run intercity routes connecting Newcastle to the rest of New South Wales.

== Newcastle Transport ==
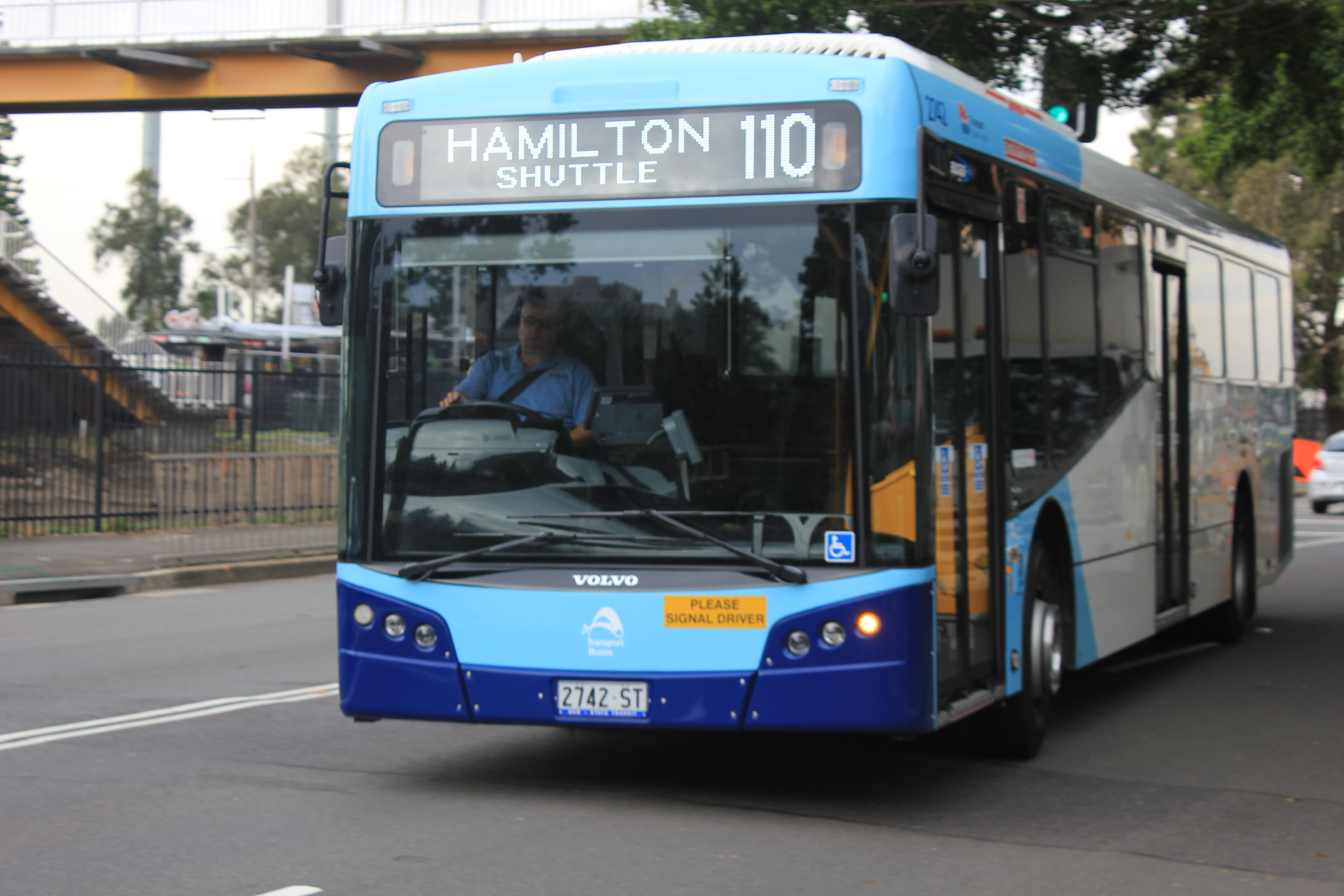
Newcastle Buses & Ferries Bustech bodied Volvo B7RLE

Following Newcastle Transport taking over the operations of Newcastle Buses & Ferries in July 2017, the network was completely redesigned from 14 January 2018.

=== Areas serviced ===
Some of the major destinations Newcastle Transport serves include Newcastle Interchange, Queens Wharf, Broadmeadow, The Junction, Mayfield, Waratah, University of Newcastle, Jesmond, Westfield Kotara, Charlestown Square, Lake Macquarie Fair, Wallsend, Stockland Glendale, Warners Bay, Belmont, John Hunter Hospital, Cardiff and Swansea.

=== Current routes ===
- 10X Newcastle Interchange – Charlestown (weekdays, express)
- 11 Queens Wharf – Mayfield – University of Newcastle – Jesmond – John Hunter Hospital – Charlestown Square (some services to Jesmond only)
- 12 Merewether Beach – Newcastle Interchange – Hamilton – Georgetown – Wallsend – Maryland (some services to Wallsend only)
- 13 Queens Wharf – Broadmeadow – John Hunter Hospital – Cardiff – Glendale
- 14 Queens Wharf – The Junction – Kotara – Charlestown – Jewells – Belmont – Swansea Heads (some services to Charlestown or Belmont only)
- 21 Marketown – Queens Wharf – The Junction – Merewether – Broadmeadow
- 22 Newcastle Interchange – The Junction – Merewether – Charlestown
- 23 Marketown – Newcastle Interchange – Broadmeadow – Lambton – North Lambton – Jesmond – Wallsend
- 24 Marketown – Carrington – Mayfield – Waratah – University – Jesmond – Wallsend
- 25 Broadmeadow – New Lambton – Kotara – Charlestown
- 26 Marketown – Newcastle Interchange – Broadmeadow – Kotara – John Hunter Hospital – Elermore Vale – Wallsend
- 27 Broadmeadow – Waratah – University – Shortland – Birmingham Gardens – Wallsend
- 28 Marketown – Newcastle Interchange – Broadmeadow – Adamstown – Charlestown – Mount Hutton
- 29 Glendale – Cardiff – Warners Bay – Eleebana – Belmont – Pelican – Swansea North (some services to Belmont only)
- 41 Charlestown – Mount Hutton – Croudace Bay – Valentine – Belmont
- 42 Wallsend – Elermore Vale – John Hunter Hospital
- 43 Charlestown – Mount Hutton – Windale – Tingara Heights – Floraville – Belmont
- 44 Kotara – Garden Suburb – Cardiff – Glendale – Speers Point – Warners Bay
- 46 Wallsend – Elemore Vale – Glendale
- 47 Marketown – Maryville – Mayfield – Warabrook – Sandgate – Shortland – Jesmond
- 48 Warners Bay – Charlestown – Dudley – Redhead – Jewells – Belmont
- 55N Queens Wharf – Hamilton – Mayfield North – Kooragang – Fern Bay – Stockton (NightOwl bus service only – no return service)
- Late NightOwl services are operated on routes 11, 12, 13, 14 and 55N.

== Hunter Valley Buses ==
- 136 Stockton – Fern Bay – Newcastle Airport – Medowie – Raymond Terrace
- 137 Lemon Tree Passage – Salt Ash – Medowie – Raymond Terrace
- 138 Newcastle Interchange – Salt Ash – Newcastle Airport – Fern Bay – Lemon Tree Passage (weekdays only)
- 140 Newcastle – Mayfield – Hexham – Tomago – Raymond Terrace
- 141 Raymond Terrace Loop (Monday to Saturday)
- 145 Newcastle Airport – Raymond Terrace – Beresfield – Stockland Green Hills
- 177 Rutherford – Budgeree Dr Loop
- 178 Rutherford – Industrial Estate – Anambah Rd Loop
- 179 Stockland Green Hills – Maitland – Leconfield – Branxton – North Rothbury (Monday to Saturday)
- 180 Stockland Green Hills – Maitland – Branxton – Singleton – Singleton (Monday to Saturday)
- 181 Woodberry – Stockland Green Hills – Maitland – Rutherford – Aberglasslyn
- 182 Thornton – Ashtonfield – Stockland Green Hills – Maitland – Rutherford
- 183 Tenambit – Stockland Green Hills – Maitland – Rutherford
- 184 Morpeth – Tenambit – Stockland Green Hills
- 185 Maitland – Lorn – Bolwarra – Largs (Limited service extends to Gresford)
- 186 Rutherford to McKeachie's Run
- 187 Stockland Green Hills – East Maitland (Monday to Saturday)
- 188 Stockland Green Hills – Metford – Thornton
- 189 Thornton to Stockland Green Hills
- 192 South Maitland Loop (Monday to Saturday)
- 259 Glendale – Cardiff – Wallsend – Maryland – Fletcher – Minmi
- 260 University of Newcastle – Wallsend – Maryland – Fletcher – Minmi
- 261 University of Newcastle – Wallsend – Maryland – Fletcher
- 262 Charlestown Square – Cardiff – Glendale – Edgeworth – Cameron Park
- 263 Charlestown Square – Cardiff – Glendale – Edgeworth – Cameron Park
- 264 Minmi – West Wallsend – Edgeworth – Glendale – Cardiff – Adamstown
- 266 Newcastle Interchange – Wallsend – Glendale – Edgeworth – West Wallsend – Seahampton (peak-hour service)
- 267 University of Newcastle – Wallsend – Cardiff – Glendale – Edgeworth – West Wallsend
- 268 Glendale – Edgeworth – Barnsley – Killingworth
- 269 Charlestown Square – Warners Bay – Speers Point – Woodrising – Toronto
- 270 University of Newcastle – Wallsend – Glendale – Woodrising – Toronto
- 271 Glendale – Teralba – Bolton Point – Fassifern – Toronto
- 273 Toronto – Blackalls Park – Fassifern
- 274 Toronto – Carey Bay – Kilaben Bay – Coal Point
- 275 Toronto – Rathmines – Arcadia Vale – Wangi Wangi – Morisset station
- 278 Morisset station – Bonnells Bay – Yarrawonga Park – Silverwater
- 279 Morisset station – Bonnells Bay – Yarrawonga Park – Sunshine
- 280 Morisset station – Avondale – Cooranbong
- 401 Singleton loop
- 402 Singleton – Darlington – Hunterview (weekdays)
- 403 Singleton – Singleton Heights
- W1 (281) Wangi Wangi – Lake Haven (Fridays only)

== Port Stephens Coaches ==
- 130 Newcastle Interchange – Newcastle Airport – Salamander Bay – Nelson Bay – Fingal Bay
- 131 Newcastle Interchange – Newcastle Airport – Salamander Bay – Nelson Bay – Shoal Bay (weekdays, express)
- 132 Soldiers Point – Salamander Bay – Vantage Estate – Nelson Bay – Little Beach
- 133 Soldiers Point – Salamander Bay – Nelson Bay – Little Beach
- 134 Soldiers Point – Anna Bay
- 135 Raymond Terrace – Salamander Bay – Nelson Bay (weekdays only)

== Rover Coaches ==
- 160 Newcastle Interchange – University of Newcastle – Kurri Kurri – Cessnock (Monday to Saturday)
- 161 Cessnock Hospital and Vineyard Grove Hoppa (weekdays)
- 162 Cessnock – South Cessnock – Aberdare – Kearsley – Abernethy (Monday to Saturday)
- 163 Morisset station – Kurri Kurri – Cessnock (peak hour service)
- 164 Maitland – Gillieston Heights – Heddon Greta – Kurri Kurri – Cessnock (some services start/terminate at Stockland Green Hills)
- 165 Cessnock West Hoppa Service (weekdays)
- 166 Stockland Green Hills – Maitland – Saddlers Ridge – Gilleston Heights – Heddon Greta – Stanford Merthyr – Kurri Kurri (weekdays)
- 167 Nulkaba and Cessnock East Hoppa (weekdays)
- 168 Cessnock – Bellbird – Pelton – Ellalong – Paxton – Millfield – Greta Main – Pelton – Bellbird – Cessnock
- 171 Kurri Kurri – Kurri Hospital – Weston (weekdays)
- 172 Kurri Kurri – Deakin Street, Kurri (one service on weekdays)
