= Eleebana =

- Suburb
- Coordinates: 32°59′46″S 151°38′06″E
- Country: Australia
- State: New South Wales
- City: Greater Newcastle
- LGA: City of Lake Macquarie
- Location: 18 km (11 mi) WSW of Newcastle; 8 km (5.0 mi) WSW of Charlestown

Government
  - State electorate: Charlestown
  - Federal division: Shortland

Area
  - Total: 3.9 km^{2} (1.5 sq mi)

Population
  - Total: 6,460 (2021 census)
  - Density: 1,656/km^{2} (4,290/sq mi)
- Postcode: 2282
- Parish: Kahibah
Suburbs around Eleebana
Lake Macquarie	Warners Bay	Mount Hutton
Lake Macquarie	Eleebana	Tingira Heights
Valentine	Croudace Bay	Floraville

Eleebana is a suburb of the City of Lake Macquarie in New South Wales, Australia, 18 kilometres (11 mi) from Newcastle's central business district along the eastern shoreline of Lake Macquarie.

== History ==
Eleebana remained unsettled until it became part of the Newcastle/Lake Macquarie urban sprawl, due to its unsuitability for agriculture. This suburb lay at the northern boundary of Threlkeld's original Bahtahbah grant, and was just south of Warner's 1280 acres. Portion 40 of 158 acres, (Kahibah Parish) was granted to G.L. Yorston in 1860, who was married to Warner's daughter; Portion 41 of 167 acres to J.B. Watt; and Portion 42 of 194 acres to Thomas Adam.

The land was poor and steep and unsuitable for agriculture and remained unsettled. However, as was usual in those times, Henry Halloran, in the 1920s and 30s, sold boatshed leases on the waterfront fronting Croudace Bay and sheds were built there and occupied during the summer. The council had difficulty in negotiating their removal after World War 1. Their sites were eventually added to Thomas H. Halton Park, Croudace Bay.

The suburbanization took place with new subdivisions mainly to the north. In 1976 Hooker-Rex Estates announced its plans to develop 240 acres around Glad Gunson Drive, which included parts of the old Croft Estate, Portion 41 and Portion 40. The first three stages of development originally contained 230 allotments, with a further 470 developed in the late 1970s/early 1980s.

In 1947, electricity came to the area and in 1948, reticulated waster was connected. The first school opened in 1955 (Eleebana Public). In 1977, sewerage was connected.
