= Bennetts Green =

- Suburb
- Coordinates: 32°59′35″S 151°41′35″E
- Country: Australia
- State: New South Wales
- City: Newcastle
- LGA: City of Lake Macquarie
- Location: 14 km (8.7 mi) SW of Newcastle; 5 km (3.1 mi) S of Charlestown

Government
  - State electorate: Charlestown
  - Federal division: Shortland

Area
  - Total: 4.5 km^{2} (1.7 sq mi)

Population
  - Total: 0 (2021 census)
  - Density: 0.00/km^{2} (0.00/sq mi)
- Postcode: 2290
- Parish: Kahibah
Suburbs around Bennetts Green
Gateshead	Gateshead	Dudley
Windale	Bennetts Green	Redhead
Jewells	Jewells	Redhead

Bennetts Green is a suburb of the City of Lake Macquarie in New South Wales, Australia, located 14 kilometres (9 mi) southwest of Newcastle's central business district on the eastern side of Lake Macquarie.

== Economy ==
It contains very few homes and is mainly a commercial shopping, small factory-warehouse area.

== New retail development ==
In 2016 land on the opposite side of the highway to the existing retail development was originally sold to the Woolworths conglomerate for $20.3M for a proposed development that would contain a Masters hardware store, however due to the collapse of the Masters chain the site was then sold to the Spotlight Group for a proposed $100M development.

The first of the businesses including Anaconda, Road Tech Marine and BP commenced operation at the grand opening of the new retail development on 31 October 2020.
