= Belmont Anti-Tank Ditch =

Anti-tank trench in Belmont, New South Wales

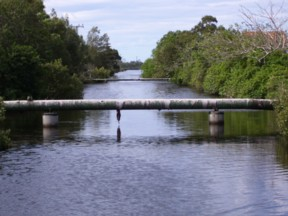
Belmont Anti-Tank Ditch (Cold Tea Creek)

The Belmont Anti-Tank Ditch was an anti-tank trench constructed in 1942 as part of the southern perimeter defensive system of the Port of Newcastle, New South Wales, Australia, as part of Fortress Newcastle during World War II. The anti-tank ditch was located 12 kilometres south of Newcastle, south of the town of Belmont.

At the time it was anticipated that the Imperial Japanese Army may attempt a beach landing between Belmont and Swansea Channel along Nine Mile Beach. Barbed wire fencing and machine gun emplacements were constructed along the entire length of Nine Mile Beach.

The anti-tank ditch was constructed where the sand spit peninsula is only about one kilometre in width and is partially taken up by Belmont Lagoon which is a large marshy lagoon which is connected to Lake Macquarie by Cold Tea Creek.

Cold Tea Creek was dredged and straightened and the creek formed the anti-tank ditch, which was designed to prevent enemy tanks proceeding north to Newcastle.

Anti-tank defences included two interlocking rows of concrete tetrahedrons tank traps or Dragons Teeth were located on the southern bank of the ditch to obstruct the movement of tanks. Twenty seven acres of dense scrubland to the immediate south of the ditch was cleared to deny cover to enemy forces and pile driven vertical timber posts or Dumble Tank Stops were located every five feet along the northern bank of the ditch to form a vertical barrier to any tanks that gained access to the ditch. The concrete tetrahedrons and vertical timber posts extended in straight lines from within Lake Macquarie to the sea.

Belmont Anti-Tank Ditch Dumble Tank Stops

A temporary bridge over the anti-tank ditch was built of timber. In the event of attack it could be collapsed quickly into the ditch by the withdrawal of five bolts.

Many of the pile driven vertical timber posts or Dumble Tank Stops are still visible; however are slowly succumbing to the elements. Two concrete tetrahedrons have been relocated to the Ken Lambkin Reserve to form a memorial, and sit on the southern bank of the creek mouth.

The 8th Garrison and 32 Brigade of the Australian Army were responsible for the defence from Adamstown, Dudley, Redhead to Blacksmiths of the southern perimeter defensive system of the Port of Newcastle.
