= Belmont North =

- Suburb
- Coordinates: 33°0′54″S 151°40′5″E
- Country: Australia
- State: New South Wales
- City: Newcastle
- LGA: City of Lake Macquarie
- Location: 138 km (86 mi) NNE of Sydney; 18 km (11 mi) SW of Newcastle; 8 km (5.0 mi) SSW of Charlestown; 46 km (29 mi) N of The Entrance; 67 km (42 mi) NNE of Gosford

Government
  - State electorates: Swansea; Charlestown
  - Federal division: Shortland

Area
  - Total: 3 km^{2} (1.2 sq mi)
- Elevation: 42 m (138 ft)

Population
  - Total: 6,291 (2021 census)
  - Density: 2,100/km^{2} (5,400/sq mi)
- Postcode: 2280
- Parish: Kahibah
Suburbs around Belmont North
Floraville	Tingira Heights	Jewells
Belmont	Belmont North	Redhead
	Belmont

Belmont North is a suburb of Greater Newcastle, City of Lake Macquarie in New South Wales, Australia, located 18 kilometres (11 mi) southwest of Newcastle's central business district on the eastern side of Lake Macquarie.

== History ==
The land was subdivided in the 1920s along with Floraville and Jewells. It was originally gazetted as Wommara Estate, named after an Awabakal word for a spear-throwing device – the name was later dedicated to a major suburban road.

In the 20th century, the suburb was dominated by the John Darling Colliery – named after a former chairman of BHP. A series of 50 Nissen huts were built in the suburb in the 1940s to house British mine workers, 23 of which still stand today. Belmont North Primary School opened in 1953 and houses around 250 pupils.

== Population ==
According to the 2016 census, there were 6,335 people in Belmont North.

- Aboriginal and Torres Strait Islander people made up 3.9% of the population.
- 89.0% of people were born in Australia. The next most common country of birth was England at 1.9%.
- 92.7% of people only spoke English at home.
- The most common responses for religion were No Religion 28.5%, Anglican 22.6%, Catholic 21.2% and Uniting Church 7.0%.
