= Valentine, New South Wales =

Valentine City of Lake Macquarie, New South Wales
- Coordinates: 33°00′54″S 151°38′06″E
- Population: 5,773 (2021 census)
  - Density: 1,519/km^{2} (3,930/sq mi)
- Established: 1869
- Postcode(s): 2280
- Elevation: 11 m (36 ft)
- Area: 3.8 km^{2} (1.5 sq mi)
- Location: 149 km (93 mi) NNE of Sydney; 20 km (12 mi) SW of Newcastle; 10 km (6 mi) SW of Charlestown; 48 km (30 mi) NNE of The Entrance; 70 km (43 mi) NNE of Gosford
- LGA(s): City of Lake Macquarie
- Parish: Kahibah
- State electorate(s): Swansea
- Federal division(s): Shortland
Suburbs around Valentine:
| Lake Macquarie | Croudace Bay | Tingira Heights |
| Lake Macquarie | Valentine | Floraville |
| Lake Macquarie | Belmont | Belmont North |

Valentine is a suburb of the City of Lake Macquarie in New South Wales, Australia, and is regarded as a part of the Greater Newcastle district. The suburb is 20 kilometres (12 mi) from Newcastle's central business district situated along the eastern shoreline of Lake Macquarie.

== History ==
It is a large residential district, with large-scale development commencing in the late 1980s. Valentine is home to number of convenience and specialty shops, including a butcher, post office, GP office, petrol station, newsagent and a bowling club.

The Awabakal people were the first people of this area.

Valentine was named after Mr Henry Valentine Joseph Geary, a property speculator and company director who grew up in Melbourne, Victoria, and settled in NSW after 1909, speculating in mining. He owned land in Valentine, but lived on the Hawkesbury River, and died there in 1933. Henry Halloran, a surveyor who surveyed the area in 1916, named the area after him. He was also responsible for surveying many of the suburbs in Sydney, including Seaforth.

Coal was mined near Valentine by the Hartley Company in the mid-1800s. The name of "Hartley Point" at the Western end of Dilkera Avenue, facing Toronto, is a nod to the original coal mining venture from the 1800s which went bankrupt after the sinking of both of its coal ships at the lake's treacherous entrance in the 1860s. The first house was built by Mr Thomas Croudace in the 1860s adjacent to the park on Valentine Crescent, and some of the trees from that original house still stand within the eastern portion of the park. A dairy was located further up the creek to the south, and at one stage the creek was dammed for a swimming area.

The first holiday cottage was built in the late 1920s but there being no usable road, no water, electricity or sewerage, development was slow. A ferry provided holiday makers with access from Speers Point and a small shop was open on weekends. Because the only access was by water, most of the houses were built on or near the foreshore adjacent to Dilkera Avenue (an aboriginal word meaning "by the shore"). The road from Warners Bay to Belmont came through in the late 1930s, and was tarred in 1956. A permanent shop was opened in 1945 and the first telephone service in 1946 with 20 subscribers. Town water and electricity came through in 1948. Children attended school in Belmont but by 1957 there were enough children to run a small school from the Progress Hall (built in 1954) whilst a new school opened in 1958.

The streets mostly have aboriginal names, except for the area originally owned then subdivided by the Toll family (hence the old name "Toll's Estate") which are named after Albert Toll and his children and grandchildren – Christopher, Frederick, Victor, Peter and Andrew.
