= Hillsborough, New South Wales =

Hillsborough Greater Newcastle, New South Wales
- Coordinates: 32°56′56″S 151°40′05″E
- Population: 641 (2021 census)
  - Density: 1,070/km^{2} (2,770/sq mi)
- Established: 1829
- Postcode(s): 2290
- Elevation: 30 m (98 ft)
- Area: 0.6 km^{2} (0.2 sq mi)
- Location: 13 km (8 mi) WSW of Newcastle; 3 km (2 mi) WNW of Charlestown; 77 km (48 mi) NNE of Gosford; 56 km (35 mi) N of The Entrance; 146 km (91 mi) NNE of Sydney
- LGA(s): City of Lake Macquarie
- Parish: Kahibah
- State electorate(s): Charlestown
- Federal division(s): Shortland
Suburbs around Hillsborough:
Cardiff South	Garden Suburb	Kotara South
Warners Bay	Hillsborough	Charlestown
Warners Bay	Mount Hutton	Gateshead

Hillsborough is a suburb of the City of Lake Macquarie, New South Wales, Australia 13 kilometres (8 mi) from Newcastle's central business district on the eastern side of Lake Macquarie. It is part of the City of Lake Macquarie north ward.

== History ==
The Aboriginal people, in this area, the Awabakal, were the first people of this land.

In 1874 a coal mining venture was started at Hillsborough, but the coal was found to be of inferior quality and could not be sold. The mine was abandoned in 1879 and the town shortly afterwards. Hillsborough remained a ghost town until it was redeveloped after World War II. Hillsborough Public School opened in 1963.
