= Jewells, New South Wales =

Jewells Greater Newcastle, New South Wales
- Coordinates: 33°01′23″S 151°41′35″E
- Population: 2,452 (2021 census)
  - Density: 383.1/km^{2} (992/sq mi)
- Postcode(s): 2280
- Area: 6.4 km^{2} (2.5 sq mi)
- Location: 15 km (9 mi) SSW of Newcastle; 6 km (4 mi) S of Charlestown
- LGA(s): City of Lake Macquarie
- Parish: Kahibah
- State electorate(s): Swansea; Charlestown
- Federal division(s): Shortland
Suburbs around Jewells:
Windale	Bennetts Green	Redhead
Tingira Heights	Jewells	Redhead
Belmont North	Belmont North	Redhead

Jewells (Awabakal: Ngorrionba) is a suburb of the City of Lake Macquarie, Greater Newcastle in New South Wales, Australia 15 kilometres (9 mi) from Newcastle's central business district on the eastern side of Lake Macquarie and north-east of the town of Belmont.

== History ==
Prior to European settlement, the area was inhabited by the Awabakal people – the Awabakal named the area Ngorrionba, meaning "where the emu breeds".

The suburb was named for John Jewell, who used to lead hunting parties in Jewells Swamp, which was home to waterfowl, kangaroo and emu. The swamp and Jewells Beach were used for a commando training course in World War II. The land was subdivided in the 1920s along with Belmont North and Floraville, but wasn't developed until the 1970s. A public school opened in 1977 and the local shopping centre opened in 1982.
