= Floraville, New South Wales =

Floraville
- Suburb
- Coordinates: 33°00′36″S 151°40′05″E
- Country: Australia
- State: New South Wales
- City: Greater Newcastle
- LGA: City of Lake Macquarie
- Location: 148 km (92 mi) NNE of Sydney; 17 km (11 mi) SW of Newcastle; 7 km (4.3 mi) SSW of Charlestown; 47 km (29 mi) NNE of The Entrance; 68 km (42 mi) NNE of Gosford
- Established: 1885

Government
  - State electorate: Swansea
  - Federal division: Shortland

Area
  - Total: 1.7 km^{2} (0.66 sq mi)
- Elevation: 58 m (190 ft)

Population
  - Total: 1,814 (2021 census)
  - Density: 1,070/km^{2} (2,760/sq mi)
- Postcode: 2280
- Parish: Kahibah
Suburbs around Floraville
Croudace Bay	Tingira Heights	Tingira Heights
Valentine	Floraville	Belmont North
Belmont	Belmont North	Belmont North

Floraville is a suburb of the City of Lake Macquarie in New South Wales, Australia 17 kilometres (11 mi) from Newcastle's central business district on the eastern side of Lake Macquarie and north of the town of Belmont.

== History ==
The land was subdivided in the 1920s along with Belmont North and Jewells, but wasn't developed until the 1960s. A sizeable chunk of the eastern section of the suburb is owned by the Gatt family but their parcel of farmland has slowly been reduced through residential expansion.

It has a primary school, which opened in 1967 and houses approximately 550 students.
