= Gateshead, New South Wales =

Gateshead Greater Newcastle, New South Wales
- Coordinates: 32°58′55″S 151°41′35″E
- Population: 3,121 (2021 census)
  - Density: 1,156/km^{2} (2,990/sq mi)
- Established: 1876
- Postcode(s): 2290
- Area: 2.7 km^{2} (1.0 sq mi)
- Location: 12 km (7 mi) WSW of Newcastle; 3 km (2 mi) S of Charlestown
- LGA(s): City of Lake Macquarie
- Parish: Kahibah
- State electorate(s): Charlestown
- Federal division(s): Shortland
Suburbs around Gateshead:
Charlestown	Charlestown	Whitebridge
Mount Hutton	Gateshead	Dudley
Windale	Bennetts Green	Redhead

Gateshead is a suburb of the City of Lake Macquarie, Greater Newcastle, New South Wales, Australia, 12 kilometres (7 mi) from Newcastle's central business district on the eastern side of Lake Macquarie. It is part of the City of Lake Macquarie East ward, and is home to a number of primary and high schools and a private hospital. Gateshead is named after Gateshead, a town in North East England.
