= Belmont South =

- Suburb
- Coordinates: 33°02′56″S 151°39′04″E
- Country: Australia
- State: New South Wales
- City: Newcastle
- LGA: City of Lake Macquarie
- Location: 134 km (83 mi) NNE of Sydney; 21 km (13 mi) SW of Newcastle; 5 km (3.1 mi) N of Swansea; 43 km (27 mi) NNE of The Entrance; 64 km (40 mi) NNE of Gosford

Government
  - State electorate: Swansea
  - Federal division: Shortland

Area
  - Total: 2.2 km^{2} (0.85 sq mi)
- Elevation: 4 m (13 ft)

Population
  - Total: 1,053 (2021 census)
  - Density: 479/km^{2} (1,240/sq mi)
- Postcode: 2280
- Parish: Kahibah
Suburbs around Belmont South
Lake Macquarie	Belmont	Belmont
Lake Macquarie	Belmont South	Pacific Ocean
Marks Point	Blacksmiths	Pacific Ocean

Belmont South is a suburb of the City of Lake Macquarie in New South Wales, Australia, located 21 kilometres (13 mi) southwest of Newcastle's central business district on the eastern side of Lake Macquarie.
