= Ryhope, New South Wales =

Ryhope
- Suburb
- Coordinates: 32°35′33″S 151°18′51″E
- Country: Australia
- State: New South Wales
- LGA: City of Lake Macquarie
- Location: 4 km (2.5 mi) NW of Awaba; 3 km (1.9 mi) E of Freemans Waterhole
- Established: 1881

Government
  - State electorate: Lake Macquarie
  - Federal division: Hunter

Population
  - Total: 35 (2021 census)
- Postcode: 2283
- Parish: Awaba

Ryhope is a small rural locality in the City of Lake Macquarie in New South Wales, Australia, located approximately eight kilometres (five miles) west of the town of Toronto and west of Lake Macquarie.

== History ==
Suburb boundaries of Ryhope were defined on 31 May 1991 and are shown on the NSW Geographical Name Board file no. GNB3506. The principal commercial interests of Ryhope include small farm holdings and a memorial park with crematorium. It is close to the Sydney-Newcastle Freeway and the Watagan Mountains. The nearest railway stations are in Awaba and Fassifern. The nearest shops are located in Toronto.

The Aboriginal people, in this area, the Awabakal, were the first people of this land.

Ryhope is most likely named after the village of the same name in the UK. The area was also known locally as Palmers Creek and Palmers Crossing.
