= Mount Hutton, New South Wales =

Mount Hutton
- Suburb
- Coordinates: 32°58′55″S 151°40′16″E
- Country: Australia
- State: New South Wales
- City: City of Lake Macquarie
- LGA: City of Lake Macquarie
- Location: 14 km (8.7 mi) WSW of Newcastle; 4 km (2.5 mi) SW of Charlestown

Government
  - State electorate: Charlestown
  - Federal division: Shortland

Area
  - Total: 2.7 km^{2} (1.0 sq mi)

Population
  - Total: 3,712 (2021 census)
  - Density: 1,375/km^{2} (3,560/sq mi)
- Postcode: 2290
- Parish: Kahibah
Suburbs around Mount Hutton
Warners Bay	Hillsborough	Charlestown
Warners Bay	Mount Hutton	Gateshead
Eleebana	Tingira Heights	Windale

Mount Hutton is a suburb of the City of Lake Macquarie, New South Wales, Australia, located 14 kilometres (9 mi) from Newcastle's central business district on the eastern side of Lake Macquarie. It is part of the City of Lake Macquarie North Ward.

== History ==
During the mid-2010s, the suburbs experienced an increase in new home construction, partly due to the suburb's proximity to the Charlestown metropolitan hub. Recent developments include townhouses at Herd Street.

The Lake Macquarie Fair shopping centre is one of the features of the suburb.
