= Croudace Bay =

- Suburb
- Coordinates: 33°00′14″S 151°38′35″E
- Country: Australia
- State: New South Wales
- LGA: City of Lake Macquarie
- Location: 19 km (12 mi) SW of Newcastle; 8 km (5.0 mi) SW of Charlestown

Government
  - State electorate: Swansea
  - Federal division: Shortland

Area
  - Total: 0.5 km^{2} (0.19 sq mi)

Population
  - Total: 641 (2021 census)
  - Density: 1,280/km^{2} (3,300/sq mi)
- Postcode: 2280
- Parish: Kahibah
Suburbs around Croudace Bay
Eleebana	Eleebana	Tingira Heights
Lake Macquarie	Croudace Bay	Floraville
Valentine	Valentine	Floraville

Croudace Bay is a suburb of the City of Lake Macquarie in New South Wales, Australia, located 19 kilometres (12 mi) southwest of Newcastle's central business district on the eastern side of Lake Macquarie.

== History ==
It was named after Thomas Croudace, a mining engineer for the Scottish-Australian Mining Company.

== Overview ==
The town has Croudace Bay Sports where rugby league, netball, cricket and tennis are played. In 2016 574 people lived there with the median age of 41. 27.8 5 had No Religion, 25.3% Anglican, 21.0% Catholic, 6.9% United Church and 6.4% Not Stated. 93.2% only speak English at home with 1% speaking Afrikaans and 0.5% speaking Polish.
