= Windale =

- Suburb
- Coordinates: 32°59′30″S 151°40′53″E
- Country: Australia
- State: New South Wales
- Region: Hunter
- City: Greater Newcastle
- LGA: City of Lake Macquarie
- Location: 141 km (88 mi) NNE of Sydney; 14 km (8.7 mi) SW of Newcastle; 4.3 km (2.7 mi) S of Charlestown

Government
  - State electorate: Charlestown
  - Federal division: Shortland

Area
  - Total: 1.7 km^{2} (0.66 sq mi)
- Elevation: 30 m (98 ft)

Population
  - Total: 3,421 (2021 census)
  - Density: 1,640/km^{2} (4,200/sq mi)
- Postcode: 2306
- County: Northumberland
- Parish: Kahibah
Suburbs around Windale
Mount Hutton	Gateshead	Gateshead
Tingira Heights	Windale	Bennetts Green
Tingira Heights	Jewells	Bennetts Green

Windale is a suburb of the city of Lake Macquarie, in the Newcastle metropolitan area. It is located west of the junction of the Pacific Highway and Newcastle Inner City Bypass, covering an area of 1.7 km^{2} (0.7 sq mi). Windale is a lower socio-economic area consisting largely of public housing homes, and has historically been known for its high rates of alcoholism, crime and unemployment, however recent local government efforts to regenerate the area have been somewhat successful. The suburb was listed as one of the most socially disadvantaged areas in the State according to the 2015 Dropping Off The Edge report.

== History ==
The Awabakal are the traditional people of this area.

== Local Government Regeneration ==
In 2012 the Lake Macquarie Council initiated a plan to regenerate and overall improve the suburb.

== Government and politics ==
At federal level, Windale is within the Division of Shortland, a safe seat for the Australian Labor Party. It has been held since 1998. The Windale booth was won easily at the 2010 federal election by the Labor Party, with a two-party preferred vote of 81.60%.

In the New South Wales Legislative Assembly, Windale is within the electorate of Charlestown. Charlestown is currently held by the Labor Party's Jodie Harrison following the 2014 Charlestown state by-election. It is a very safe Labor seat.

Windale is located within the East Ward of the City of Lake Macquarie, which elected one Labor, one Liberal, one Greens and independent councillors at the 2007 local government elections.
