= Swansea Heads =

- Suburb
- Coordinates: 33°05′35″S 151°39′43″E
- Country: Australia
- State: New South Wales
- City: Greater Newcastle
- LGA: City of Lake Macquarie
- Location: 3 km (1.9 mi) E of Swansea

Government
  - State electorate: Swansea
  - Federal division: Shortland

Area
  - Total: 1.5 km^{2} (0.58 sq mi)

Population
  - Total: 609 (2021 census)
  - Density: 406/km^{2} (1,050/sq mi)
- Postcode: 2281
- Parish: Wallarah
Suburbs around Swansea Heads
	Lake Macquarie
Swansea	Swansea Heads	Pacific Ocean
Caves Beach		Pacific Ocean

Swansea Heads is a locality on the Swansea peninsula between Lake Macquarie and the Pacific Ocean in New South Wales, Australia. It is part of Greater Newcastle, City of Lake Macquarie local government area.

== History ==
The Aboriginal people, in this area, the Awabakal, were the first people of this land.

Aboriginal middens were excavated in the area in 1972.

In May 2014 sinkholes appeared near houses due to subsidence into the abandoned Swansea coal mine.
