= Jack Marshall (rugby union) =

- Born: John Samuel Marshall; 21 March 1926 Belmont, New South Wales
- Died: 6 March 2013 (aged 86)

Rugby union career
- Position: wing
International career
Years	Team	Apps	(Points)
1949	Wallabies	1	(0)

John Samuel "Jack" Marshall (21 March 1926 – 6 March 2013) was a rugby union player who represented Australia.

Marshall, a wing, was born in Belmont, New South Wales and claimed 1 international rugby cap for Australia.
