= Tingira Heights =

- Suburb
- Coordinates: 32°59′46″S 151°39′36″E
- Country: Australia
- State: New South Wales
- City: Greater Newcastle
- LGA: City of Lake Macquarie
- Location: 16 km (9.9 mi) SW of Newcastle; 6 km (3.7 mi) SSW of Charlestown
- Established: 1960s

Government
  - State electorate: Charlestown
  - Federal division: Hunter

Area
  - Total: 4.2 km^{2} (1.6 sq mi)

Population
  - Total: 2,043 (2021 census)
  - Density: 486/km^{2} (1,260/sq mi)
- Postcode: 2290
- Parish: Kahibah
Suburbs around Tingira Heights
Eleebana	Mount Hutton	Windale
Eleebana	Tingira Heights	Jewells
Croudace Bay	Floraville	Belmont North

Tingira Heights is a suburb of City of Lake Macquarie in New South Wales, Australia, 16 kilometres (10 mi) south-west of Newcastle's central business district on the eastern side of Lake Macquarie. It was developed in the 1960s.

== History ==
The Awabakal are the traditional people of this area.

Prior to 1965, the suburb was called Violet Town. A ship named after the Indigenous tribe Tingira (on the NSW/QLD border) was Australia's first naval training vessel in 1912 and was decommissioned in 1941. In 1965 the H.M.A.S Tingira Old Boys Association asked to have a town named after the ship, and the name was adopted by the Violet Town Progress Association. Tingara is an alternative spelling.
