= Dudley, New South Wales =

Dudley Newcastle, New South Wales
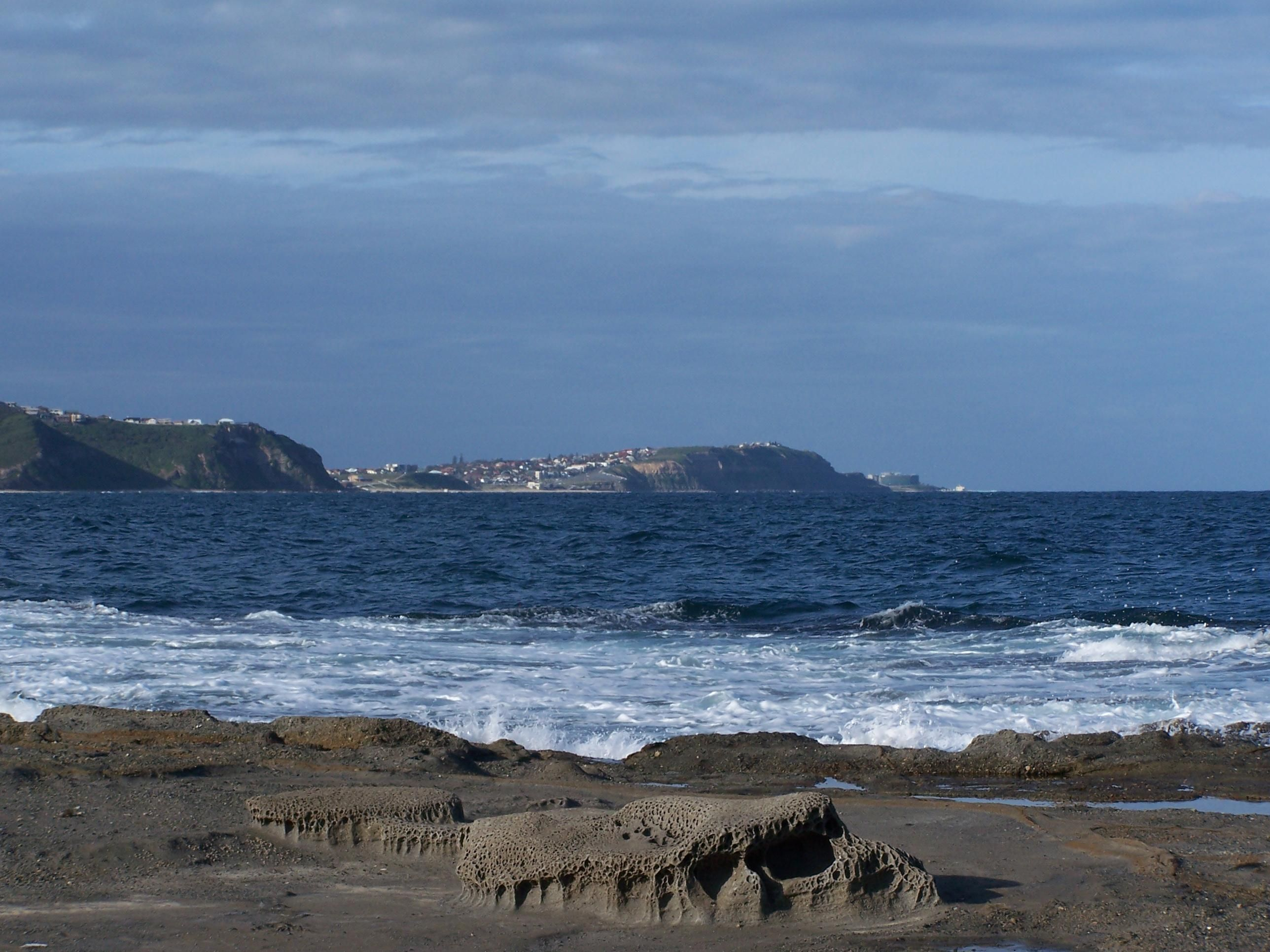

- Coordinates: 32°59′24″S 151°43′05″E
- Population: 2,505 (2021 census)
  - Density: 491/km^{2} (1,272/sq mi)
- Postcode(s): 2290
- Area: 5.1 km^{2} (2.0 sq mi)
- Location: 13 km (8 mi) SW of Newcastle; 4 km (2 mi) SE of Charlestown
- LGA(s): City of Lake Macquarie
- Parish: Kahibah
- State electorate(s): Charlestown
- Federal division(s): Shortland
Suburbs around Dudley:
Whitebridge	Whitebridge
Gateshead	Dudley	Pacific Ocean
Redhead	Redhead

Dudley is a southern coastal suburb of Newcastle, New South Wales, Australia, 13 kilometres (8 mi) southwest of Newcastle's central business district on the eastern side of Lake Macquarie. It is part of the City of Lake Macquarie local government area.

== History ==
The Aboriginal people, in this area, the Awabakal, were the first people of this land.

Dudley started off as a mining town. Dudley developed into a suburb after World War II.

== Dudley Public School ==
Dudley Public school opened in 1892 and has among its alumni two recipients of the Victoria Cross. In 1976, the Jeffries and Currey Memorial Library was opened by the Governor of New South Wales, Sir Roden Cutler, himself a VC, at Dudley Public School to honour the two ex-pupils who were decorated with the Victoria Cross during the First World War: Clarence Jeffries and William Currey.

Jeffries and Currey (who survived the war and later went on to become a member of the NSW parliament) are also memorialised on the school's honour board which, in addition, records the names of the 93 other former pupils (of whom 19% were killed in action) who served in the First World War – a remarkable contribution given the small population of the school and the community in the early part of the 20th century.
