= City of Lake Macquarie =

- Local government area
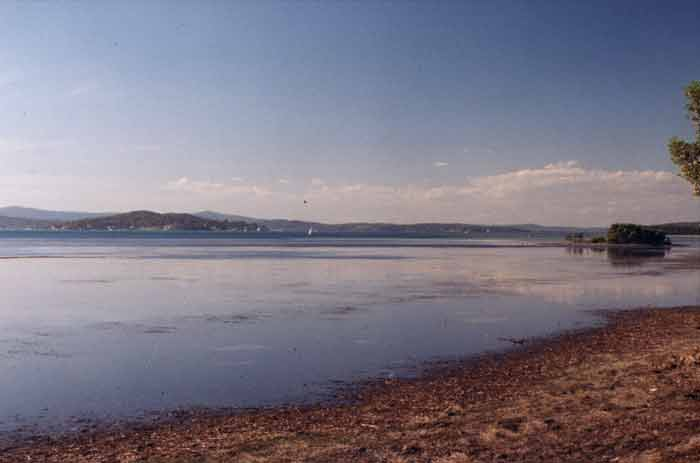
- Lake Macquarie, after which the LGA is named Location in Greater Newcastle

- Interactive map of City of Lake Macquarie
- Coordinates: 33°02′S 151°38′E
- Country: Australia
- State: New South Wales
- Region: Hunter (Greater Newcastle)
- Established: 16 May 1906 (Shire); 1 January 1977 (Municipality); 7 September 1984 (City)
- Council seat: Speers Point

Government
  - Mayor: Adam Shultz (Labor)
  - State electorates: Lake Macquarie; Swansea; Charlestown; Cessnock; Wallsend
  - Federal divisions: Shortland; Hunter

Area
  - Total: 648 km^{2} (250 sq mi)

Population
  - Total: 213,845 (2021 census) (23rd)
  - Density: 315/km^{2} (820/sq mi)
- Time zone: UTC+10 (AEST)
  - Summer (DST): UTC+11 (AEDT)
- Website: City of Lake Macquarie
LGAs around City of Lake Macquarie
Cessnock	Newcastle	Newcastle
Cessnock	City of Lake Macquarie	Tasman Sea
Central Coast	Central Coast	Tasman Sea

The City of Lake Macquarie, locally known as Lake Mac, is a local government area (LGA) in the Hunter Region in New South Wales, Australia. It is located on the east coast of Australia, strategically located midway on the eastern seaboard between Melbourne and Brisbane. The city is approximately 150 km (93 mi) north of Sydney. At the centre of the city is Australias largest coastal lake, and the city's namesake Lake Macquarie.

It was proclaimed a city on 7 September 1984.

The mayor of the city is Councillor Adam Shultz, a member of the Labor Party.

The Royal Australian Navy ship HMAS Tobruk was granted the Right of Freedom of Entry to the city on 9 August 1991.

== History ==
=== Aboriginal heritage ===
The Lake Macquarie region forms part of the traditional lands of the Awabakal people, who have lived around the Lake and its catchment for more than 8,000 years. The name Awabakal is commonly interpreted as meaning "people of the calm surface", a reference to the sheltered waters of Lake Macquarie.

Archaeological evidence of long‑standing occupation is found throughout the area, including shell middens, stone artefacts, and rock art sites located along the Lake’s foreshores, creek lines, and surrounding woodlands. These cultural places reflect the Awabakal people’s reliance on the region’s abundant marine and terrestrial resources, as well as their deep spiritual connection to Country.

=== European exploration ===
The first recorded European to enter Lake Macquarie was Captain William Reid, who in 1800 sailed his schooner Martha through the Swansea entrance after mistaking it for the mouth of the Hunter River. The error was only realised upon his return to Sydney, and the waterway became known as Reid’s Mistake until it was officially renamed Lake Macquarie in 1826 in honour of Governor Lachlan Macquarie. The southern headland at the lake entrance retains the name Reid’s Mistake.

Reid’s visit generated little immediate interest, and no further European exploration occurred for two decades. Access to the area was limited by difficult terrain, and Newcastle, then known as King’s Town, functioned as an isolated penal settlement, discouraging wider settlement or investigation.

=== Council beginnings ===
Lake Macquarie was proclaimed a shire on 16 May 1906 following the introduction of the Local Government (Shires) Act 1905 in New South Wales. The shire’s first local government election was held on 24 November 1906, with residents choosing six councillors to represent three ridings, designated "A", "B" and "C".

The inaugural meeting of the newly elected Council took place at the Teralba Court House on 8 December 1906. At this meeting, Councillor Sydney Croudace was unanimously elected as the first President of the Shire. His term extended until 1 February 1908, and the Presidential allowance was set at £50 per annum.

The Shire of Lake Macquarie was proclaimed as a municipality on 1 January 1977 and became a city on 7 September 1984.

=== Council Chambers and Administration Buildings ===
Lake Macquarie Shire Council had its offices in Cardiff from 1906 until 1915.

In 1913, the Lake Macquarie Land Company donated land at the corner of Main Road and Council Street, Speers Point, for the construction of a Council Chamber. A tender for the new Shire Office and Chamber was accepted in June 1914, and the building was first used for a Council meeting on 8 May 1915. It was officially opened the following year, on 6 June 1916.

As the organisation expanded, a new Council Chamber and Shire Office was built in 1955 on Main Road, Speers Point, opposite the original site. The building was officially opened on 5 November 1955 by the Minister for Public Works and Local Government, J. B. Renshaw.

Further growth led to the development of a modern administration complex in the late 1970s. Stage I of the new Administration Building was opened by the Premier of New South Wales, Neville Wran, on 12 August 1977, with Stage II opened on 31 August 1979. The completed facility, costing approximately $4.5 million, remains the core of Council’s administration today. In 2020 approximately 4458 square metres of workspace across three levels of the building were reconfigured and upgraded to a modern fit-out.

In November 2024 fire severely damaged a large part of Lake Macquarie City Council’s Administrative Centre The fire caused extensive heat and smoke damage, with insurance estimates to repair the damage reaching $41 million, prompting the building’s closure, temporary offices were set up at the former Ausgrid building in Wallsend.

== Suburbs / Town Centres ==
Lake Macquarie is home to 92 suburbs including nine Town Centre's scattered around the city. The Town centres include Belmont, Cardiff, Charlestown, Glendale, Morisset, Mount Hutton, Swansea, Toronto and Warners Bay. Some suburbs sit within both Lake Macquarie City and City of Newcastle's boundaries.

The suburbs in the city are split into three wards – East, North and West.

East Ward

- Belmont
- Belmont North
- Belmont South
- Bennetts Green
- Blacksmiths
- Cams Wharf
- Catherine Hill Bay
- Caves Beach
- Charlestown
- Crangan Bay (Note: Shared with Central Coast Council)
- Croudace Bay
- Eleebana
- Floraville
- Gateshead
- Jewells
- Little Pelican
- Marks Point
- Moonee
- Mount Hutton
- Murrays Beach
- Nords Wharf
- Pelican
- Pinny Beach
- Redhead
- Swansea
- Swansea Heads
- Tingira Heights
- Valentine
- Warners Bay
- Windale

North Ward

- Adamstown Heights (Note: Shared with City of Newcastle)
- Boolaroo
- Cameron Park
- Cardiff
- Cardiff Heights
- Cardiff South
- Charlestown
- Dudley
- Edgeworth
- Elermore Vale
- Garden Suburb
- Glendale
- Highfields
- Hillsborough
- Kahibah
- Kotara South
- Lakelands
- Macquarie Hills
- New Lambton Heights
- Rankin Park
- Seahampton
- Speers Point
- Warners Bay
- West Wallsend
- Whitebridge

West Ward

- Arcadia Vale
- Argenton
- Awaba
- Balcolyn
- Balmoral
- Barnsley
- Blackalls Park
- Bolton Point
- Bonnells Bay
- Booragul
- Brightwaters
- Buttaba
- Carey Bay
- Coal Point
- Cooranbong
- Dora Creek
- Eraring
- Fassifern
- Fennell Bay
- Fishing Point
- Freemans Waterhole
- Holmesville
- Kilaben Bay
- Killingworth
- Mandalong
- Marmong Point
- Martinsville
- Mirrabooka
- Morisset
- Morisset Park
- Myuna Bay
- Rathmines
- Ryhope
- Silverwater
- Sunshine
- Teralba
- Toronto
- Wakefield
- Wangi Wangi
- Windermere Park
- Woodrising
- Wyee
- Wyee Point
- Yarrawonga Park

== Recreation ==
=== Beaches ===
Lake Macquarie has approximately 32 km of open ocean coastline extending along the Tasman Sea with Dudley, Redhead, Nine Mile, Blacksmiths, Hams, Caves, Pinny, Middle Camp, Catherine Hill Bay, Moonie and Ghosties beaches sitting on its length. Council lifeguards patrol Blacksmiths, Catherine Hill Bay, Caves Beach and Redhead beaches annually from the September/October school holidays through to April.

=== Speers Point Park ===
The park was officially opened on 22 May 1888 and on 15 October 1910 it was transferred to the Lake Macquarie Shire Council. Speers Point Park is the city's premier recreation space featuring open space, shared pathways, a paved promenade, a fenced dog exercise area and the all-abilities Lake Macquarie Variety Playground that opened in 2008.

=== Swimming ===
There are 4 Council operated pools Charlestown, Swansea, Speers Point and West Wallsend and two contractor pools, Toronto and Morisset. There are open water baths at Belmont and Toronto as well as Grannies Pool a sheltered, shallow tidal pool in Blacksmiths.

=== Fernleigh Track ===
One of the Hunter region's most popular shared-use pathways, the Fernleigh Track is a 15 km rail-trail for pedestrians and cyclists that extends between the City of Lake Macquarie and the City of Newcastle. It features heritage railway relics, including former stations and the historic Fernleigh Tunnel, and passes through the suburbs of Adamstown, Kahibah, Whitebridge, Redhead and Jewells before ending near Belmont TAFE. The route follows the former Belmont railway line and takes in Glenrock State Conservation Area, Awabakal Nature Reserve and Belmont Wetlands State Park.

== Arts and culture ==
Lake Macquarie has a number of cultural and artistic locations:

- The Museum of Art and Culture Lake Macquarie, yapang (MAC), formerly known as Lake Macquarie City Art Gallery, was established in 1980. The gallery was initially housed in the former Lake Macquarie council chambers on Main Road, Speers Point, before relocating to First Street, Booragul, in 1996. From 1996 to 2000 the gallery operated from Awaba House on the Booragul site. A decision was then made to construct a purpose‑built facility, designed by Colin Still of Cox Richardson. The new state‑of‑the‑art building opened in May 2001, with an art seminar room added in 2008.
- Multi-Arts Pavilion, mima, a one-of-a-kind cultural destination, designed as a dynamic and adaptable space for national and international contemporary art installations, digital art screenings, immersive audio experiences, live theatre, music, and more.
- Dobell House - Sir William Dobell's home and studio professionally managed by the Sir William Dobell Memorial Association since 1971. The home is preserved to a high standard in acccordance with the National Standards for Museums.
- South Sea Islands Museum was established in 1966 adjacent to Ellen White’s home Sunnyside in Cooranbong. It contains a collection of artifacts that have been gathered from the cultures and societies of the South Pacific Division and donated for permanent display.
- Rathmines Heritage Centre hosts a range of exhibitions focused on the history of Rathmines RAAF base and the wider story of Lake Mac during World War II.
- Rathmines Theatre hosts performances and productions such as live music, theatre, dance, community events and festivals with a capacity for up to 200 people.
- The Warners Bay Theatre is a 300-capacity theatre available for professional and amateur musical, theatre, dance, and cultural groups to host and perform quality stage productions.

== State-listed heritage items and precincts ==
Lake Macquarie has seven listings on the State Heritage Register:

- Catherine Hill Bay Cultural Precinct
- Dobell House
- Glenrock early coalmining sites
- Morisset Hospital Precinct
- Rathmines Park (former RAAF Seaplane Base)
- Wangi Power Station Complex
- WWII RAAF Radar Station 208 (former)

== Freeman of the City ==
The Freeman of the City recognises individuals for their outstanding achievements and dedicated service to the community over their lifetime.

March 1985	Prof Cyril Renwick AO
July 1986	Mr Harold Keith Cumming
July 1987	Mr Albert George (Alby) Burgin
December 1987	Mr Reginald Lenaghan OAM
November 1991	Dr Roland Edward Robinson OAM
August 1999	Mr Paul William Harragon
July 2008	Mrs Ellen Kilpatrick
July 2008	Mr Donald Telfer Caldwell
July 2021	Mrs Mercia Buck OAM
May 2024	Dr David Durrheim AM

== Education ==
=== Libraries ===
The city has 11 libraries at Belmont, Cameron Park, Cardiff, Charlestown, Morisset, Redhead, Speers Point, Swansea, Toronto, Wangi Wangi and Windale.

== Sister cities ==
The City of Lake Macquarie has sister city relations with the following cities:

- Hakodate, Hokkaidō, Japan
- Tanagura, Fukushima, Japan
- Rotorua, Bay of Plenty, New Zealand
- Round Rock, Texas, United States of America

== Demographics ==
Lake Macquarie suburbs (2021)
- Charlestown: 13,601
- Cameron Park: 9,977
- Warners Bay: 8,237
- Belmont: 7,289
- Cooranbong: 7,077
- Eleebana: 6,460
- Edgeworth: 6,401

The city consists of 92 connected suburbs that surround a coastal saltwater lake, ranging from small rural style communities through to high density areas.

At the 2021 census, there were 213,845 people in the Lake Macquarie local government area, of these 48.8% were male and 51.2% were female. Aboriginal and Torres Strait Islander people made up 5.5% of the population, which was higher than the national and state averages. The median age of people in the City of Lake Macquarie was 42 years. Children aged 0–14 years made up 18.1% of the population and people aged 65 years and over made up 22% of the population. Of people in the area aged 15 years and over, 47.7% were married and 13.2% were either divorced or separated.

At the 2021 census, the proportion of residents in the Lake Macquarie local government area who stated their ancestry as Australian was 42.7%. In excess of 58% of all residents in the City of Lake Macquarie nominated a religious affiliation with Christianity at the 2011 census, which was slightly higher than the national average of 50.2%. Meanwhile, as at the census date, compared to the national average, households in the Lake Macquarie local government area had a significantly lower than average proportion (5.4%) where two or more languages are spoken (national average was 20.4%); and a significantly higher proportion (93.0%) where English only was spoken at home (national average was 76.8%).

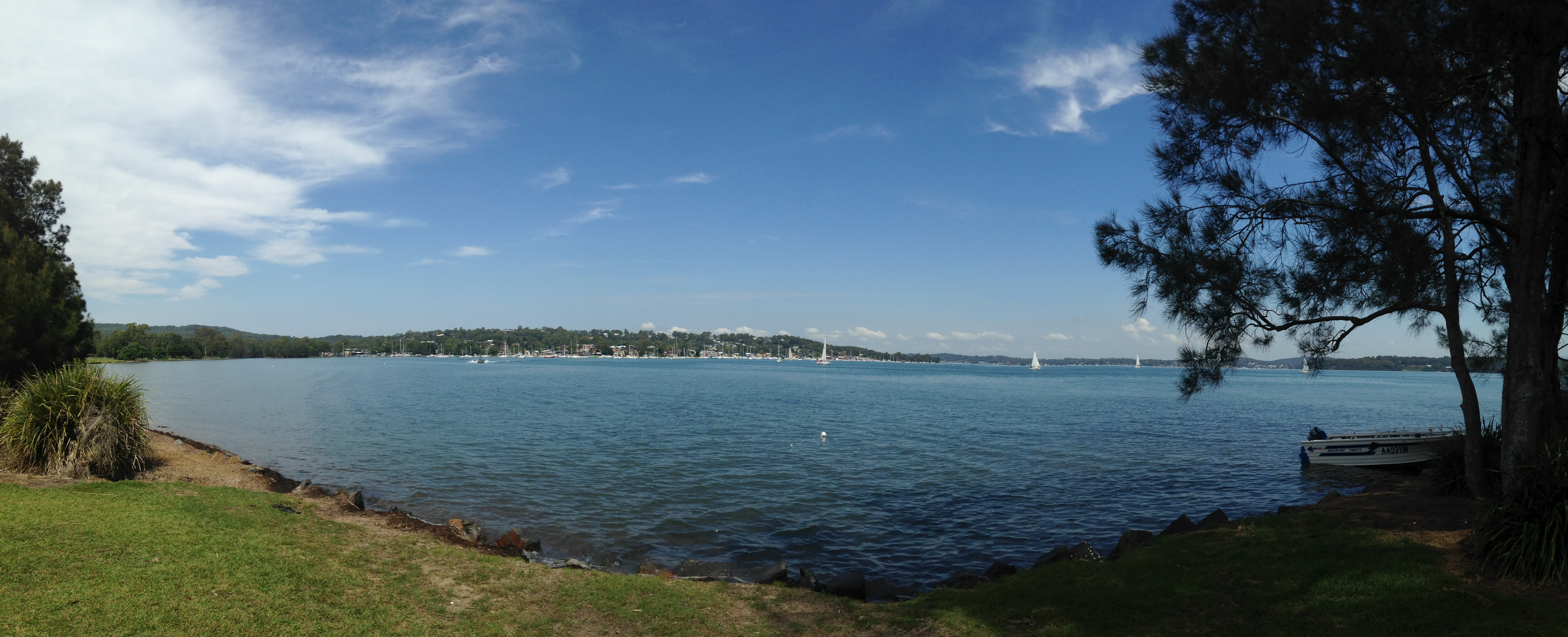
Lake Macquarie at Croudace Bay

Selected historical census data for Lake Macquarie local government area
Census year		2001	2006	2011	2016	2021
Population	Estimated residents on Census night	177,185	183,138	189,006	197,371	213,845
Population	LGA rank in terms of size within New South Wales		4th	4th	▼13th	
Population	% of New South Wales population			2.73%	▼2.64%	▲2.65%
Population	% of Australian population	0.94%	▼0.92%	▼0.88%	▼0.84%	0.84%
Cultural and language diversity						
Ancestry, top responses	Australian			33.7%	▼32.0%	▲42.7%
Ancestry, top responses	English			32.2%	▼31.9%	▲43.9%
Ancestry, top responses	Scottish			8.2%	▲8.6%	▲11.8%
Ancestry, top responses	Irish			7.7%	▲8.3%	▲10.9%
Ancestry, top responses	German			3.0%	▲3.1%	
Language, top responses (other than English)	Italian	0.3%	0.3%	0.3%	▼0.2%	
Language, top responses (other than English)	Macedonian	0.3%	0.3%	0.3%	0.3%	▼0.2%
Language, top responses (other than English)	Mandarin				0.3%	0.3%
Language, top responses (other than English)	Italian				0.3%	▼0.2%
Language, top responses (other than English)	German	0.3%	0.3%	0.3%	▼0.2%	0.2%
Language, top responses (other than English)	Cantonese	n/c	▲0.2%	0.2%		
Language, top responses (other than English)	Spanish	n/c	n/c	▲0.2%	0.2%	0.2%
Religious affiliation						
Religious affiliation, top responses	No Religion	12.5%	▲15.5%	▲19.7%	▲28.9%	▲42.0%
Religious affiliation, top responses	Anglican	29.1%	▼27.6%	▼26.2%	▼21.3%	▼15.7%
Religious affiliation, top responses	Catholic	23.0%	▼22.9%	▼22.8%	▼20.8%	▼18.0%
Religious affiliation, top responses	Uniting Church	10.0%	▼8.8%	▼5.8%	▲5.9%	▼4.1%
Religious affiliation, top responses	Presbyterian and Reformed	4.4%	▼4.0%	▼3.6%		
Median weekly incomes						
Personal income	Median weekly personal income		A$394	A$520	A$609	A$759
Personal income	% of Australian median income		84.5%	90.1%	▲92%	▲94.3%
Family income	Median weekly family income		A$922	A$1,396	A$1,610	A$2,050
Family income	% of Australian median income		89.8%	94.3%	▲92.8%	▲96.7%
Household income	Median weekly household income		A$1,102	A$1,177	A$1,313	A$1,623
Household income	% of Australian median income		94.1%	90.5%	▲91.3%	▲93.0%

== Economics ==
Lake Macquarie has a significant coal mining industry and smaller agriculture and manufacturing industries. Eraring power station, a 1980s-era coal-fired power station, supplies 25% of New South Wales' power. Lake Macquarie has a number of Constructed Wetlands with the council placing an emphasis on the environment.

== Council ==
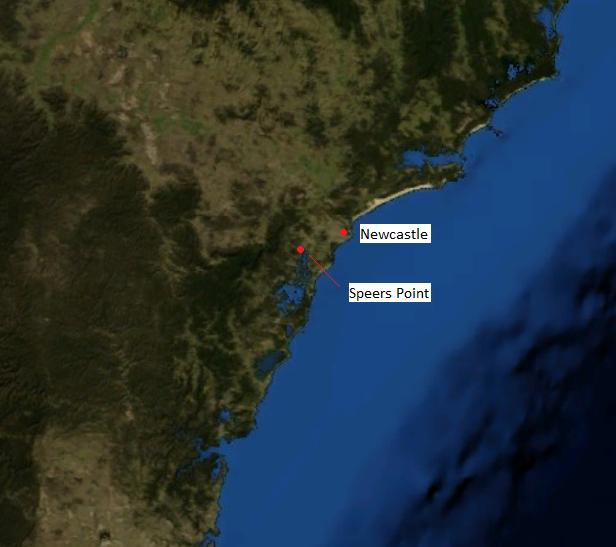
Speers Point, which is shown in relation to Newcastle, is the seat of government for the city of Lake Macquarie.

=== Current composition and election method ===
Lake Macquarie City Council is composed of thirteen councillors, including the mayor, for a fixed four-year term of office. The mayor is directly elected while the twelve other Councillors are elected proportionally as three separate wards, each electing four Councillors. The most recent election was held on 14 September 2024, and the makeup of the council, including the mayor, is as follows:

Party	Councillors
Labor	6
Liberal	3
Lake Mac Independents	3
Independent	1
Total	13

The current Council, elected in 2024, in order of election by ward, is:

Ward	Councillor	Party	Notes
Mayor	Adam Shultz	Labor	
East Ward	Christine Buckley	Labor	
East Ward	Matt Schultz	Liberal	
East Ward	Stacey Radcliffe	Labor	
East Ward	Michael Hannah	Lake Mac Independents	
North Ward	Colin Grigg	Lake Mac Independents	
North Ward	Jack Antcliff	Liberal	
North Ward	Brian Adamthwaite	Labor	
North Ward	Keara Conroy	Labor	
West Ward	Kate Warner	Lake Mac Independents	
West Ward	Madeline Bishop	Labor	
West Ward	Jason Pauling	Liberal	
West Ward	Anthony Swinsburg	Independent	

== Election results ==
=== 2024 ===
2024 Lake Macquarie City Council election: Ward results
Party	Votes	%	Swing	Seats	Change
Labor	46,239	35.2	−4.0	5	▼1
Liberal	30,363	23.1	−2.6	3	Steady
Lake Mac Independents	28,530	21.7	+2.3	3	Steady
Greens	13,257	10.1	+0.3	0	Steady
Independents	7,221	5.5	+1.9	1	▲1
Community First Inds	2,942	2.2		0	Steady
Our Local Community	2,819	2.1		0	Steady
Formal votes	131,371	92.8			
Informal votes	10,133	7.2			
Total	141,504	100.0		12	
Registered voters / turnout	166,305	85.1			

=== 2021 ===
2021 New South Wales local elections: Lake Macquarie
Party	Votes	%	Swing	Seats	Change
Labor	50,340	39.2		6	▲1
Liberal	33,078	25.7		3	Steady
Lake Mac Independents	24,922	19.4		3	Steady
Greens	12,571	9.8		0	Steady
Independent	4,661	3.6		0	Steady
Shooters, Fishers, Farmers	29,80	2.3		0	Steady
Formal votes	128,552				
