= South Sea Islands Museum =

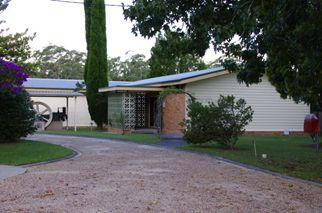
- A distant street view of the entrance on Avondale Rd to the South Seas Island Museum
- Established: 1964
- Dissolved: 2017
- Location: 27 Avondale Rd, Cooranbong
- Coordinates: 33.074093°S 151.462751°E
- Type: Museum
- Parking: On site
- Website: https://heritage.adventistchurch.com/

In 1964 the South Sea Islands Museum was founded in Cooranbong, in New South Wales, Australia, to display artifacts collected by Seventh-day Adventist missionaries, who entered Australia in 1885 and expanded into New Zealand, Papua New Guinea, Solomon Islands, Gilbert and Ellice Islands, Fiji, Tonga, Kiribati, Samoa, Cook Islands, Tahiti and Pitcairn Islands.

The museum displayed artefacts from the South Pacific Islands such as; carvings, weapons, clothing, shells and other artifacts in an 1896 building that was originally a house.

The records of the missionaries' work in Australia and in the South Sea Island region dating from the 1880s are held in the Adventist Heritage Centre which is located at Cooranbong. According to the Australian Department of the Environment and Heritage, "these rich and diverse records of provenance add to the significance of items in the museum."

== History ==
As interest in the collection grew a decision was made to house the growing collection in a building of its own. This building was located at 27 Avondale Road, Cooranbong opened in 1964.

== Exhibitions ==
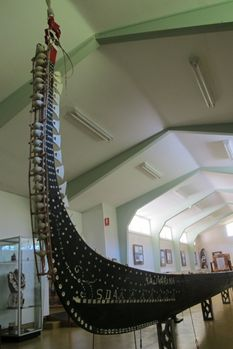
Solomon Islands war canoe on display at The South Sea Islands Museum (picture taken Feb 2106)

The general exhibits change regularly, and a large war canoe permanently dominates one half of the building which also includes various themed exhibitions throughout the year.

The most visually arresting exhibit is a Solomon Islands war canoe. Its arrival in Australia in 1968 was announced in the Sydney Morning Herald:

Giant War Canoe Arrives

"Once used for head-hunting raids in the Solomon Islands, this 52 foot war canoe arrived in Sydney ..., carefully "bandaged" in sacking as protection against souvenir hunters. The canoe was unloaded from the Burns Philip Freighter, Tulagi at Walsh Bay and will eventually be displayed at the Seventh-day Adventist Church's South Pacific Island Museum at Cooranbong, 80 miles north of Sydney".

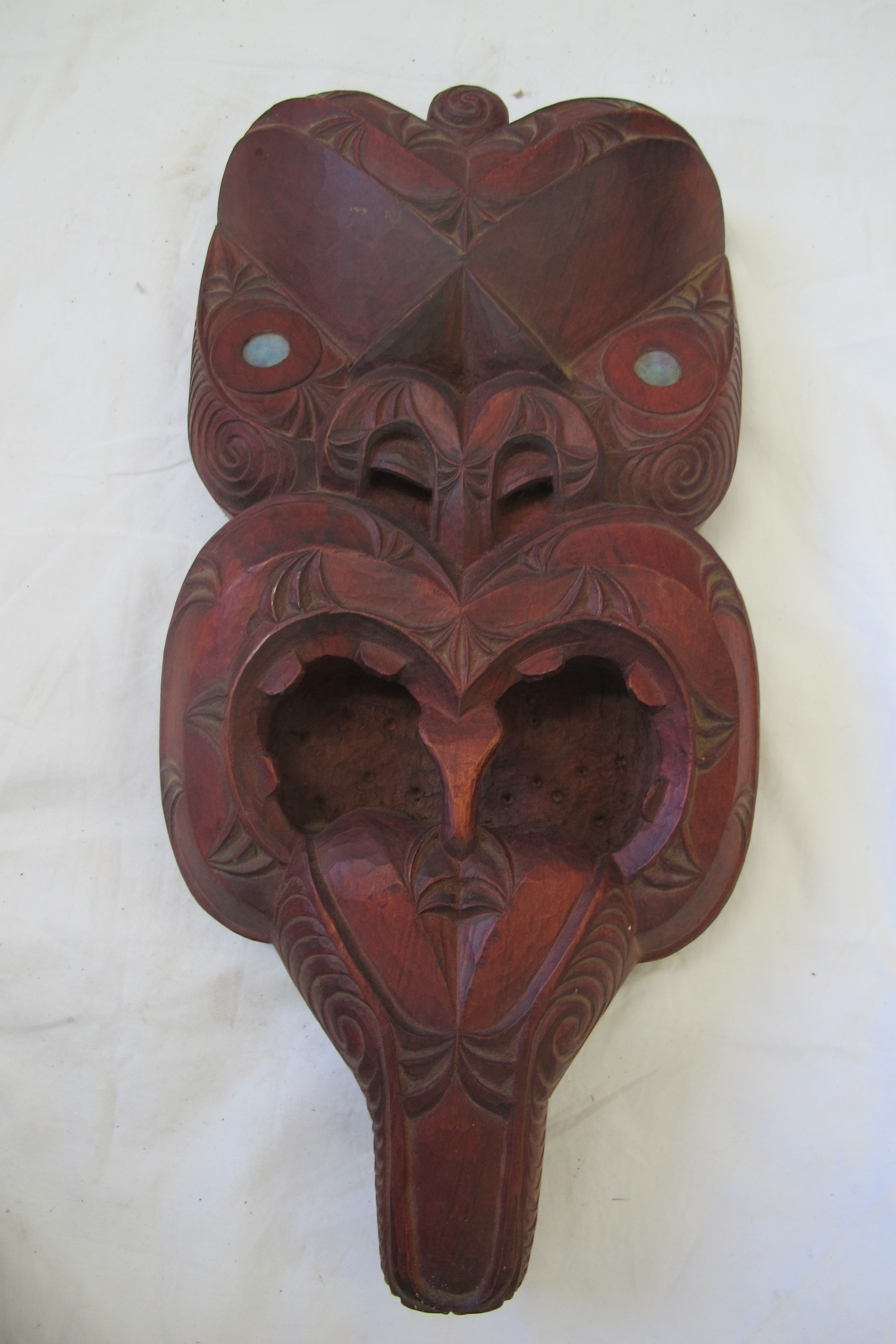
A Maori meeting house god with Paua shell eyes, donated to the museum by Col Gibson

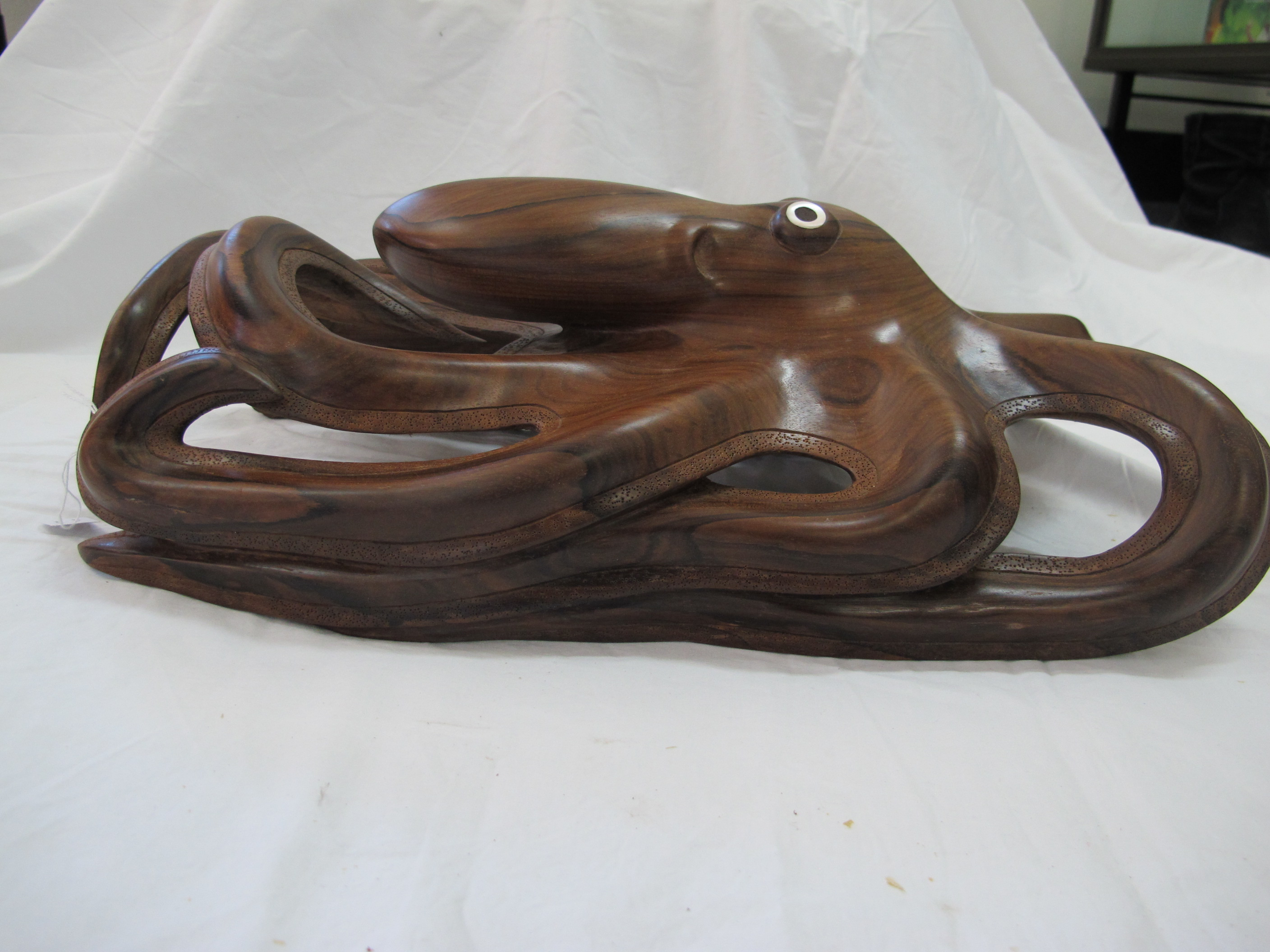
Octopus carving, a gift from staff at Atoiti Adventist Hospital, Solomon Islands. Donated by Raymond Hobbs

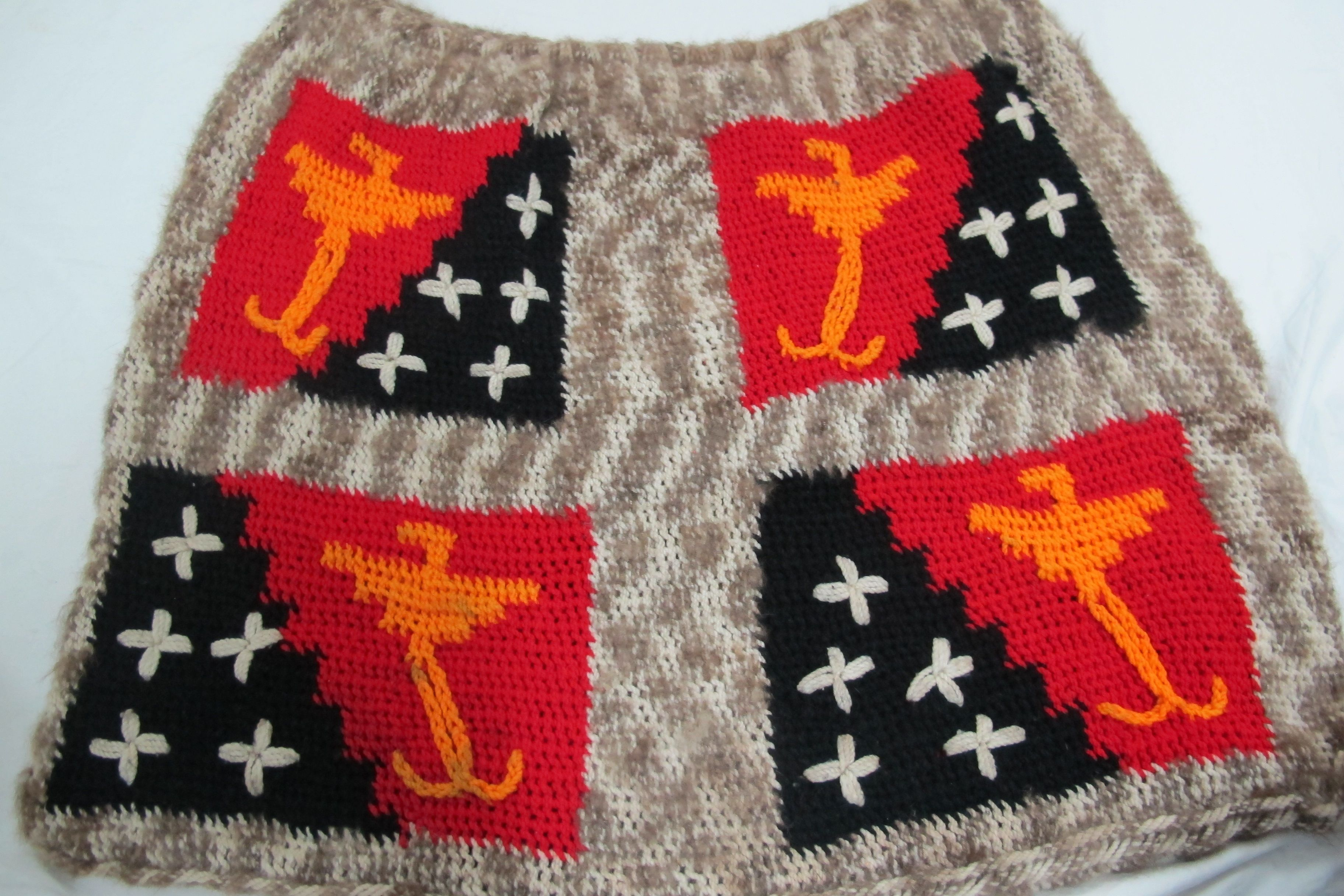
Papua New Guinea Bilum, red, black, beige and yellow, single handle, part of Weslake collection

== Closure ==
The South Sea Island Museum is permanently closed. All artefacts are in storage and being looked after by the Adventist Heritage Centre, with plans to establish a new museum in the future.

== See also ==
- Seventh-day Adventist Church
- Ellen G. White
- History of the Seventh-day Adventist Church
- Seventh-day Adventist Church Pioneers
