= Lake Macquarie Yacht Club =

Yacht club in Australia

Coordinates: 33°02′23″S 151°39′19″E

- Short name: LMYC
- Founded: 1929
- Location: Belmont, New South Wales, Australia
- Website: Lake Macquarie Yacht Club

Lake Macquarie Yacht Club (LMYC) is a yacht club located on Ada Street, Belmont, New South Wales, Australia.

The club was founded in 1929 to cater for skiffs over 16 feet and combine both cruising and racing activities in its calendar of events. At a meeting on 2 October 1929 A. V. Toll was elected president; R. G. Gardiner, commodore; Dr Blumer, vice-commodore; and J. G. Biddlecombe, secretary and handicapper.

At the annual general meeting in September 1933 members voted to erect a clubhouse at Belmont at a cost of £500.

== Wins by LMYC yachts ==
Irene, co owned by Harry and Bill Hughes, won the 1953 Sydney to Noumea Yacht Race on handicap. The yacht was designed and built by Harry and Bill Hughes in the backyard of their house at New Lambton, New South Wales. Irene sailed with Lake Macquarie sail number M19.

Rival, co-owned by N. D. Rundle and A. G. Burgin, won the 1961 Sydney to Hobart Yacht Race on handicap. The yacht was built locally at Speers Point by L. J. and B. P. Steel & Sons.

Valhalla, co-owned by A. Hankin and P. Hankin, won the 1965 Brisbane to Gladstone Ocean Race.

Piccolo, owned by John Pickles and crewed by Albert Mitchell (sailing master), Bob Brenac (navigator), David Powys, Stephen Lamb, John Rowe and Roy Baker, won the 1976 Sydney to Hobart Yacht Race on handicap.

Legend, owned by Ray Kiely, won the Gosford to Lord Howe Island Yacht Race in 1979 and 1981.
