= Redhead, New South Wales =

Suburb of Newcastle, Australia

Redhead
- Suburb
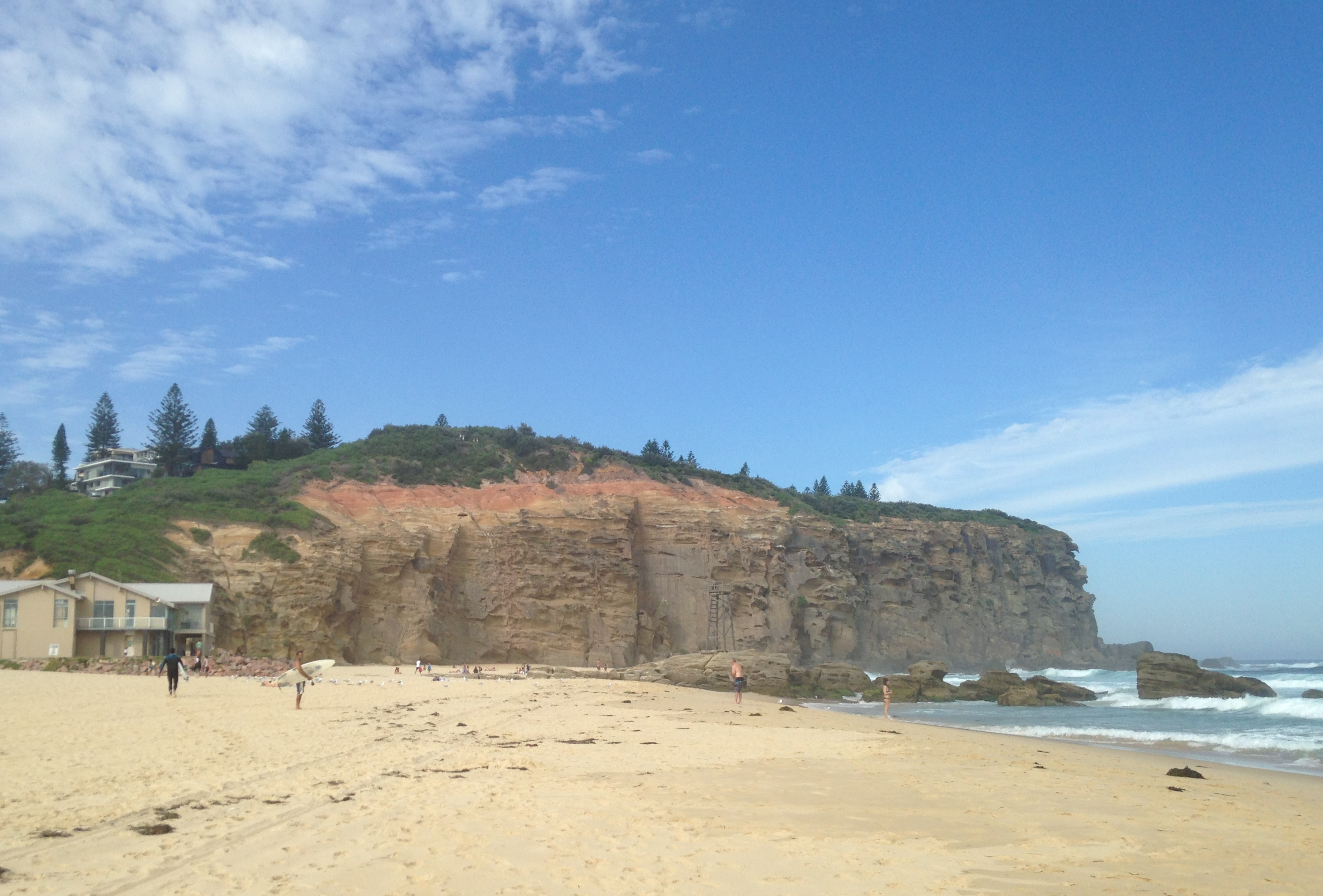
- Redhead Bluff

- Coordinates: 33°00′36″S 151°43′23″E
- Country: Australia
- State: New South Wales
- City: Greater Newcastle
- LGA: City of Lake Macquarie
- Location: 150 km (93 mi) NNE of Sydney; 16 km (9.9 mi) SSW of Newcastle; 6 km (3.7 mi) SSE of Charlestown; 50 km (31 mi) NNE of The Entrance; 71 km (44 mi) NNE of Gosford
- Established: 1829

Government
  - State electorates: Charlestown; Swansea
  - Federal division: Shortland

Area
  - Total: 5.4 km^{2} (2.1 sq mi)
- Elevation: 25 m (82 ft)

Population
  - Total: 3,785 (2021 census)
  - Density: 701/km^{2} (1,815/sq mi)
- Postcode: 2290
- Parish: Kahibah
Suburbs around Redhead
| Bennetts Green | Dudley | Dudley |
| Jewells | Redhead | Pacific Ocean |
| Belmont | Belmont | Pacific Ocean |

Redhead is a coastal suburb of the City of Lake Macquarie, Greater Newcastle, New South Wales, Australia 16 kilometres (10 mi) south of Newcastle's central business district on the Pacific Ocean. It was named for the appearance of its headland, Redhead Bluff, when viewed from the sea.

== History ==
The Aboriginal people, in this area, the Awabakal, were the first people of this land.

Early industries included a banana orchard and mining. A mine explosion killed five people in 1926. The suburb was developed in the late 1940s. The first school opened in 1908.

The railway line that connected Redhead with Newcastle and Belmont was closed in 1971. It was converted to a popular walking and cycling path called the Fernleigh Track. It was opened in 2009.

The suburb is best known for its beach, a popular surfing location in Newcastle.

Over the past few years the suburb has been plagued by a number of fires, including in 2013.
