= Belmont, New South Wales =

Belmont Greater Newcastle, New South Wales
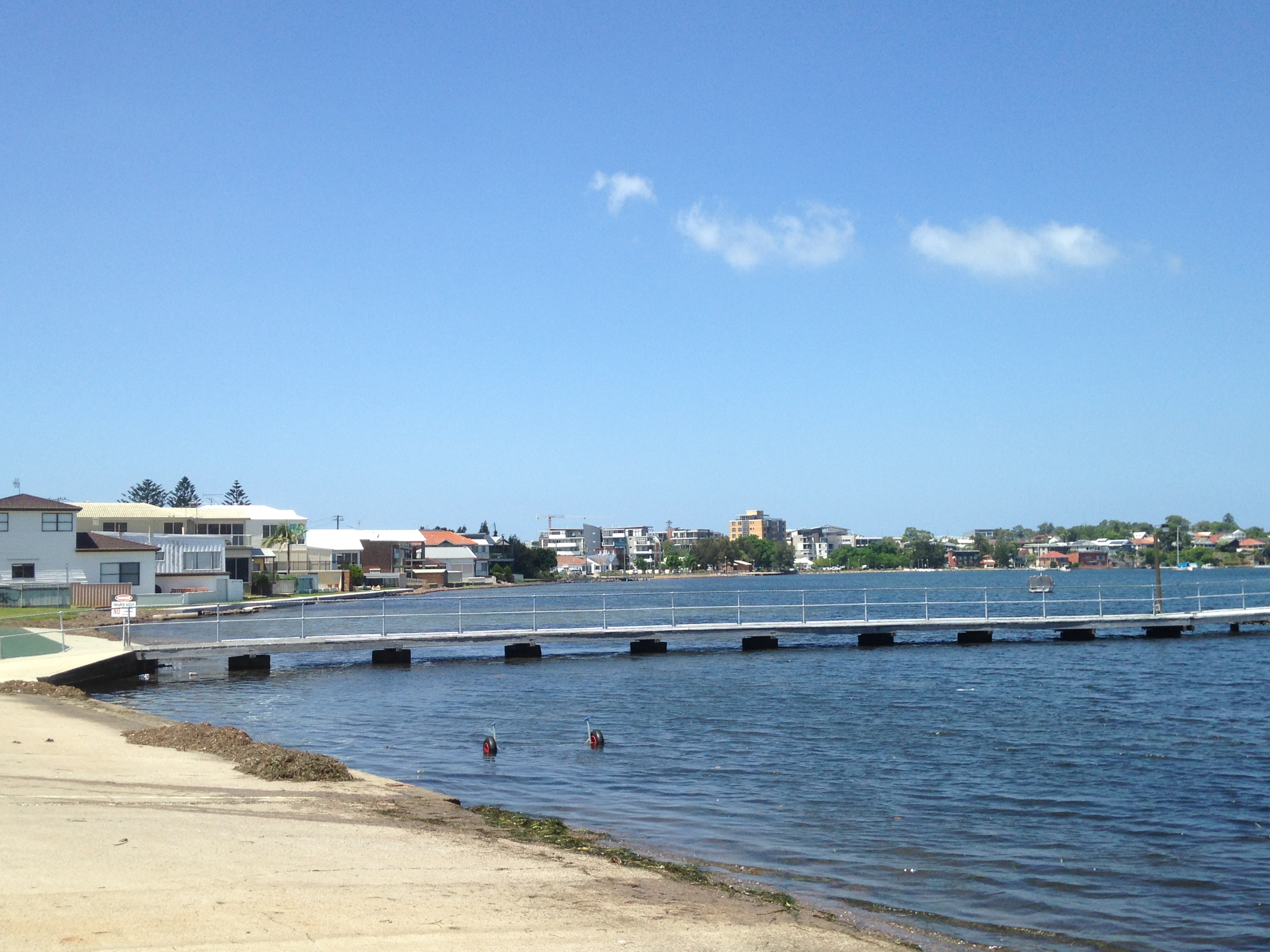
- View from Belmont 16s sailing club

- Coordinates: 33°02′13″S 151°39′36″E
- Population: 7,289 (2021 census)
  - Density: 828/km^{2} (2,145/sq mi)
- Established: 1825
- Postcode(s): 2280
- Elevation: 8 m (26 ft)
- Area: 8.8 km^{2} (3.4 sq mi)
- Location: 136 km (85 mi) NNE of Sydney; 20 km (12 mi) SW of Newcastle; 10 km (6 mi) SSW of Charlestown; 45 km (28 mi) N of The Entrance; 66 km (41 mi) NNE of Gosford
- LGA(s): City of Lake Macquarie
- Parish: Kahibah
- State electorate(s): Swansea
- Federal division(s): Shortland
Suburbs around Belmont:
Valentine	Belmont North	Redhead
Lake Macquarie	Belmont
Lake Macquarie	Belmont South	Pacific Ocean

Belmont (Awabakal: Bahtahbah) is a suburb in the City of Lake Macquarie New South Wales, Australia, located 20 kilometres (12 mi) from Newcastle's central business district on the eastern side of Lake Macquarie.

Belmont is situated on a sandy peninsula formed by the Tasman Sea on the east and Lake Macquarie.

== History ==
Prior to European settlement, the area around Belmont was inhabited by the Awabakal people – the Awabakal named the area Bahtahbah, meaning "hill on a lake". In 1825, Reverend Lancelot Edward Threlkeld established a Christian mission at Belmont at the behest of the London Missionary Society, occupying the area where the present-day TAFE campus is. He established small scale farming of wheat and Indian Corn and employed the local Aboriginal people to help him. While doing so, Threlkeld – with the help of local tribesman Biraban – recorded phonetically the language of the Awabakal and produced the first serious works on Aboriginal language, its grammar, usage, and relation to other Aboriginal tribal languages.

Thomas Williamson (1833–1880) was born in the northernmost island of Unst, Shetland Islands in a hamlet called Belmont. He was the third settler in the Lake Macquarie area and in 1865 selected 100 acres, including the site of Rev. Threlkeld's old Aboriginal mission to settle. On the rising land leading to the top of the hill, near the corner of Walter and Victoria Streets (and what became, many years later the Infants School) he built a large residence to serve as a guest house, naming it after the town of his birth "Belmont" House. It is thought the village which grew up around it may have assumed the name from the house. As the village grew, some of the streets were named after his children: Ada St leads down to the Lake Macquarie Yacht Club, Maude St comes from Cahill Oval down to the water at the baths. Walter St would have come right past the old Belmont house whilst Alick (named for Alexander) and Ernest Sts marked the eastern boundary of the original acreage. Thomas St, outside the shopping centre, is named after Thomas Williamson himself. On the eastern side of the old house Williamson planted a vineyard, facing towards the lagoon, and to the north an orchard including banana trees.

In 1874, he erected the first church just near where George St meets the highway, and the Belmont Post Office was opened in 1877 with Thomas Williamson himself as Postmaster. He continued in this capacity until his death. He was also the first licensee of the Belmont Hotel, which opened nearby the church. In 1873, realising that there were enough children in the local village to warrant the existence of one, he opened the first school, a single-roomed building, next to Maudeville Cottage. John Anderson bought "Anderson's Hill" in 1870 and built a guesthouse called "Bellevue" after which the road was named.

The area from Ross St on the water, to Lewers St was bought by Robert D. Lewers, Sydney Manager of the Bank of London and subdivided in 1916, known as Lewers Estate for many years.

The land around the lake was of such poor quality, apart from in small patches, that as early as 1828, Henry Dangar, Government Surveyor, knew that it was more suited " to the retired naval, military or civil officer, or to the merchant, inclined to quit the busy scene, one who is fond of shooting, fishing, or hunting, or boat sailing, where he can enjoy living with a most salubrious air..." Any industrial use or mining in the lake was constrained by the terrible nature of the bar on the lake's entrance at Swansea. Hence, in order to provide to a larger need for lifestyle and recreation, rather than industrial use, the issue of transport was vital. The road had been a major problem from almost the beginning of the township's life. It was reported as "one of the worst in the colony" – only 12 miles from Newcastle but taking two and a half to three hours by dray. Guesthouses failed to thrive because of the severity of the road conditions and really it was not until the road was formally fixed in the 1910s, and the Pacific Highway came through in the 1920s, that Belmont was able to make the most of its beautiful surroundings, and the township started to thrive. In addition, the New Redhead Estate & Coal Company extended their trainline to Belmont, where both a station and coal-loading ramps and sidings were constructed. Passenger trains ran every day of the week to Belmont. The line was closed in 1991.

Through urbanisation and the use of the hills to the north and north-east of the peninsula, Belmont has become one of the major centres of Lake Macquarie. The suburb itself is currently (2011 census) the fourth-largest by population, with the surrounding locality (consisting of Belmont North, Floraville and Jewells) the largest locality within the jurisdiction of Lake Macquarie City Council.

== Demographics ==
According to the 2016 census of population, there were 7,114 people in Belmont.

- Aboriginal and Torres Strait Islander people made up 3.0% of the population.
- 85.2% of people were born in Australia. The next most common country of birth was England at 2.4%.
- 90.9% of people only spoke English at home.
- The most common responses for religion were No Religion 27.4%, Anglican 23.0% and Catholic 20.6%.

== Facilities ==
Belmont is home to many shops, restaurants and many other amenities. Belmont and the surrounding locality also include 4 primary schools (Belmont Public School, Belmont North Public School, Floraville Public School and Jewells Public School); 2 secondary schools, Belmont High School and Belmont Christian College, along with a tertiary institution in the form of a campus of TAFE NSW (formerly Hunter Institute of TAFE). Belmont Hospital, located on Croudace Bay Road, is the only public hospital in Lake Macquarie. Belmont Baths, a public swimming enclosure measuring 70m in length and 45m in width, re-opened to the public on 22 December 2018.

== Transport ==
Until May 2006, Aeropelican (now FlyPelican) operated scheduled passenger services from Belmont Airport to Sydney Airport. The discontinuation of these services has all but closed the airfield, with owners seeking to develop the land. Belmont Airport is now privately co-owned by Red Bull Air Race pilot Matt Hall and a skydiving company.

== Coal ==
CPH railmotor prepares to leave Newcastle station for Belmont, c1972

John Darling Colliery

Many collieries, large and small, sought coal from the coal seams which were plentiful in the Belmont area, the largest of these being the BHP's John Darling Colliery at Belmont North. The New Redhead Estate & Coal Mining Company operated a railway until recent times from Belmont to Adamstown, a suburb of Newcastle, where it joined the New South Wales Government Railways Main Line. The railway carried passenger trains as well as coal trains and served several collieries. Also, situated on a spur line just south of Belmont railway station, was a large railway coal loading facility, whereby motor trucks from collieries as far afield as Swansea, could load their coal into railway trucks for transporting to Newcastle's port. The smaller collieries closed due to the 1960s - 1970s slump in the industry, the last being Belltop Colliery. The larger collieries closed later.

== Notable people ==
- Daniel Abraham – Rugby league player
- Biraban/We-pohng – Awabakal tribe leader
- Daniel Halangahu – rugby union player
- Caitlan Johnston-Green – rugby league player
- Brett Kimmorley – rugby league player
- Craig Kimmorley – rugby league player
- Jack Marshall – rugby player
- Jeff McCloy – Lord Mayor of Newcastle
- Blake Mueller – rugby league player
- Brock Mueller – rugby league player
- Jessica Pickering – Olympic trampolinist
- Alex Read – football/soccer player
