= Charlestown, New South Wales =

Charlestown
- Suburb
- Coordinates: 32°57′54″S 151°41′06″E
- Country: Australia
- State: New South Wales
- City: Greater Newcastle
- LGA: City of Lake Macquarie
- Location: 10 km (6.2 mi) WSW of Newcastle CBD; 142 km (88 mi) NNE of Sydney; 10 km (6.2 mi) NNE of Belmont; 54 km (34 mi) NNE of The Entrance; 75 km (47 mi) NNE of Gosford

Government
  - State electorate: Charlestown
  - Federal division: Shortland

Area
  - Total: 6.7 km^{2} (2.6 sq mi)
- Elevation: 116 m (381 ft)

Population
  - Total: 13,601 (2021 census)
  - Density: 2,030/km^{2} (5,260/sq mi)
- Postcode: 2290
- Parish: Kahibah
Suburbs around Charlestown
Kotara South	Adamstown Heights	Kahibah
Hillsborough	Charlestown	Whitebridge
Mount Hutton	Gateshead	Whitebridge

Charlestown is a suburb of the City of Lake Macquarie, New South Wales, Australia, and the largest suburb in Lake Macquarie and in the Greater Newcastle area. It is approximately 10 kilometres (6 mi) west-south-west of the central business district of Newcastle.

== History ==
The Aboriginal people in this area, the Awabakal, were the first people of this land.

Originally granted to the Waratah Coal Company, the area was the site of the company's first shaft, sunk in 1873. Officially called South Waratah Colliery (later just Waratah Colliery), the pit was variously known as Charles' Pit, Raspberry Gully or The Gully Pit. These names all applied to Charlestown in its early days and the surviving name seem to have been derived from that of Charles Smith, the company's manager. The first settlers were miners from the pit. The colliery closed in 1961.

The company had the area surveyed on 29 April 1876; the first subdivision later became Ida Street, Pearson Street, Milson Street and Frederick Street. Harry Wright bought the first lot when it was auctioned later in 1876.

The town had its first water main in 1927 and was connected to civic sewage in 1959.

== Commercial area ==
The commercial area of Charlestown is situated around the Pacific Highway. Charlestown Square is a large shopping centre located just off the Pacific Highway. There are also two smaller shopping centres including Hiltop Plaza and The Forum Centre, an office and retail centre located on Pacific Highway featuring a Hoyts Cinema. Charlestown features clusters of shops along Pacific Highway as well as in surrounding streets.

The suburb has a police station and a fire station. New South Wales Ambulance has its Northern Communications Centre in the suburb, off Dudley Road.

== Schools ==
The suburb contains four primary schools; the State schools of Charlestown Public, Charlestown South Public and Charlestown East Public, and the Catholic diocese's St Joseph's Primary School. The state primary schools feed into nearby Whitebridge High School, while the catholic primary school feeds into nearby St Mary's Catholic College at Gateshead and St Pius X High School at Adamstown.

== Population ==
According to the 2016 census of Population, there were 12,912 people in Charlestown.

- Aboriginal and Torres Strait Islander people made up 2.3% of the population.
- 83.8% of people were born in Australia. The next most common countries of birth were England 2.2%, New Zealand 0.9% and India 0.8%.
- 88.1% of people spoke only English at home. Other languages spoken at home included Macedonian at 0.9%.
- The most common responses for religion were No Religion 30.4%, Catholic 23.3% and Anglican 17.4%.
