= Lake Macquarie (New South Wales) =

Coastal lake in Australia

- Newcastle, Central Coast, New South Wales
- Awaba (Awabakal)
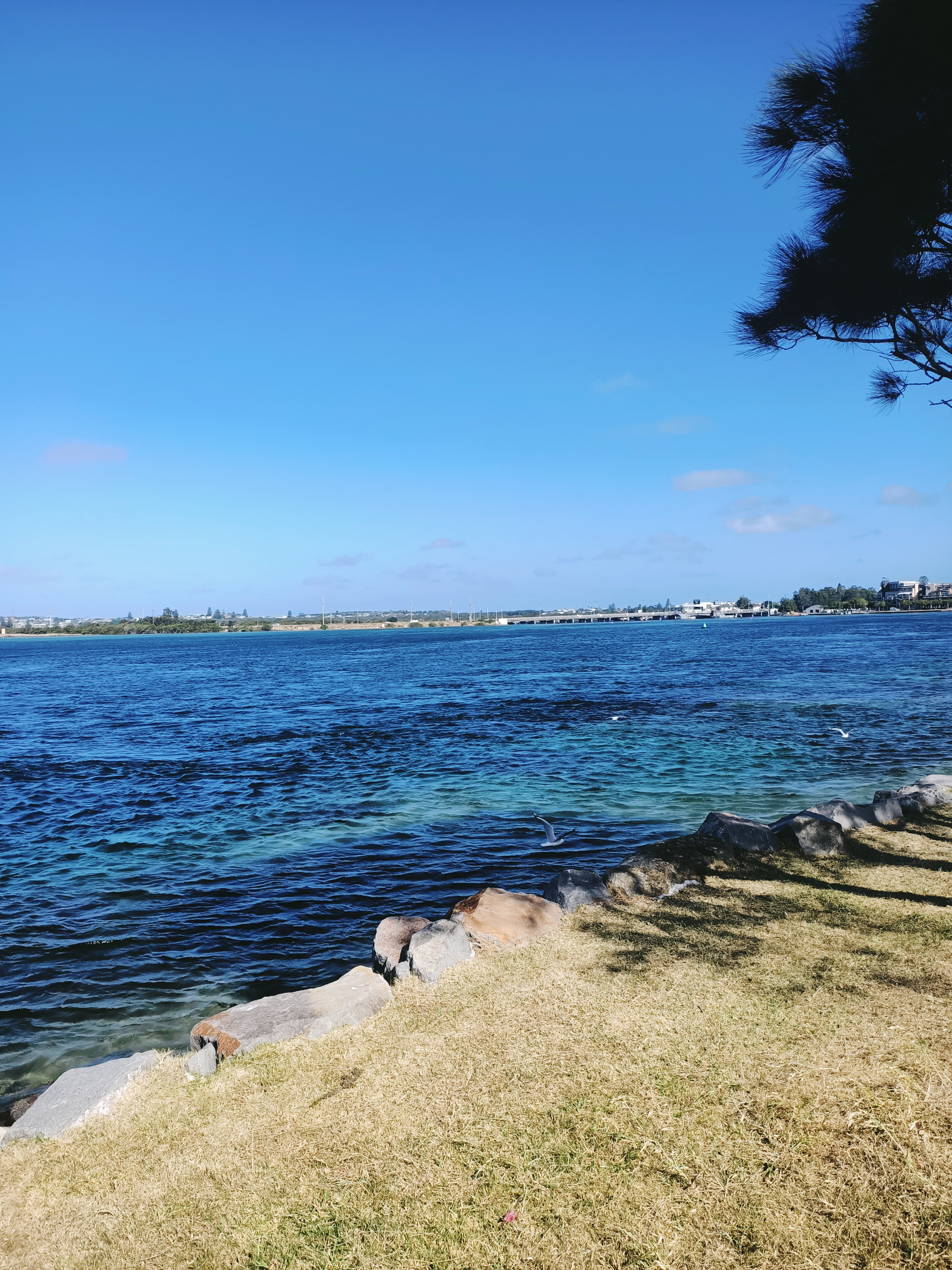
- View from Swansea showing Lake Macquarie

- Location within New South Wales
- Location: Hunter, Central Coast (Map)
- Coordinates: 33°05′S 151°35′E
- Type: An open and trained youthful wave dominated barrier estuary
- Primary inflows: Cockle Creek, Dora Creek
- Primary outflows: Tasman Sea
- Catchment area: 604.4 km^{2} (233.4 sq mi)
- Basin countries: Australia
- Max. length: 24 km (14.9 mi)
- Max. width: 7.9 km (4.9 mi)
- Surface area: 110 km^{2} (42.5 sq mi)
- Average depth: 8 m (26 ft)
- Max. depth: 15 m (49 ft)
- Shore length^{1}: 174 km (108.1 mi)
- Surface elevation: 0 m (0 ft) AHD
- Frozen: never
- Islands: Pulbah Island plus several small islands
- Settlements: City of Lake Macquarie, Central Coast Council
- Website: Lake Macquarie at the Office of Environment & Heritage
- ^{1} Shore length is not a well-defined measure.

Pulbah Island Nature Reserve
- IUCN category Ia (strict nature reserve)
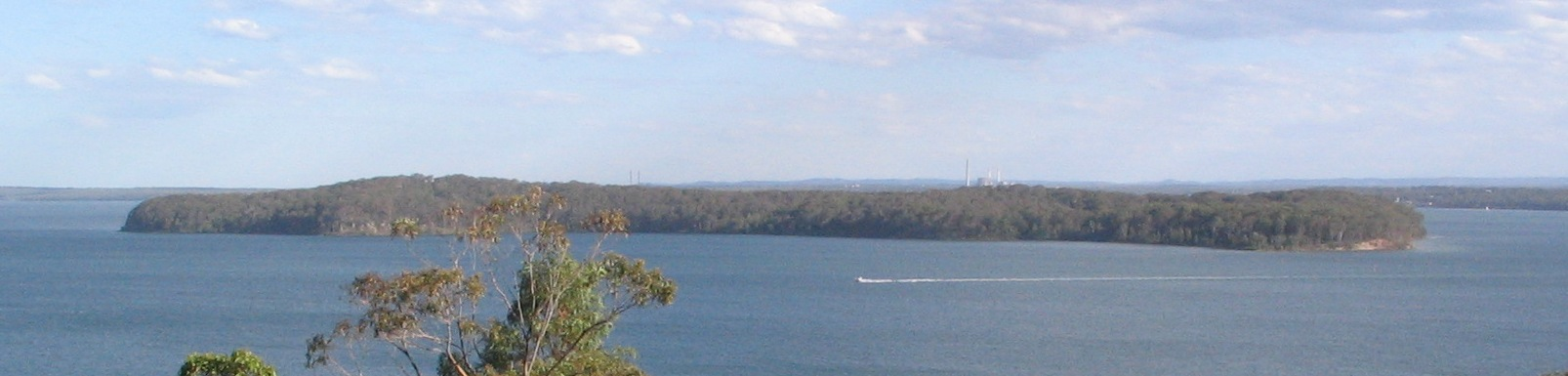
- Photo showing the northern side of Pulbah Island

- Location within New South Wales
- Location: New South Wales
- Nearest city: Lake Macquarie
- Coordinates: 33°05′34″S 151°35′24″E
- Area: 68 ha (170 acres)
- Established: July 1970
- Visitors: Restricted
- Website: Official website

Lake Macquarie (Awabakal: Awaba) is Australia's largest coastal lake. Located in the City of Lake Macquarie and Central Coast Council local government areas in the Hunter and Central Coast regions of New South Wales, Australia, it covers an area of 110 square kilometres (42.5 sq mi) and is connected to the Tasman Sea by a short channel. Most of the residents of the City of Lake Macquarie live near the shores of the lake.

Lake Macquarie is twice as large as Sydney Harbour and is the largest coastal salt water lake in the Southern Hemisphere. It is slightly smaller than Port Stephens, which is about 43 kilometres (27 mi) to the northeast of the lagoon.

== History ==
Aboriginal people of the Awabakal nation lived in the area surrounding what is now known as Lake Macquarie for thousands of years. The name Awaba, which means "a plain surface" was used to describe the lagoon. There are several significant sites in and around this country. Including; Butterfly Cave, Glenrock State Reserve and Pulbah Island Nature Reserve.

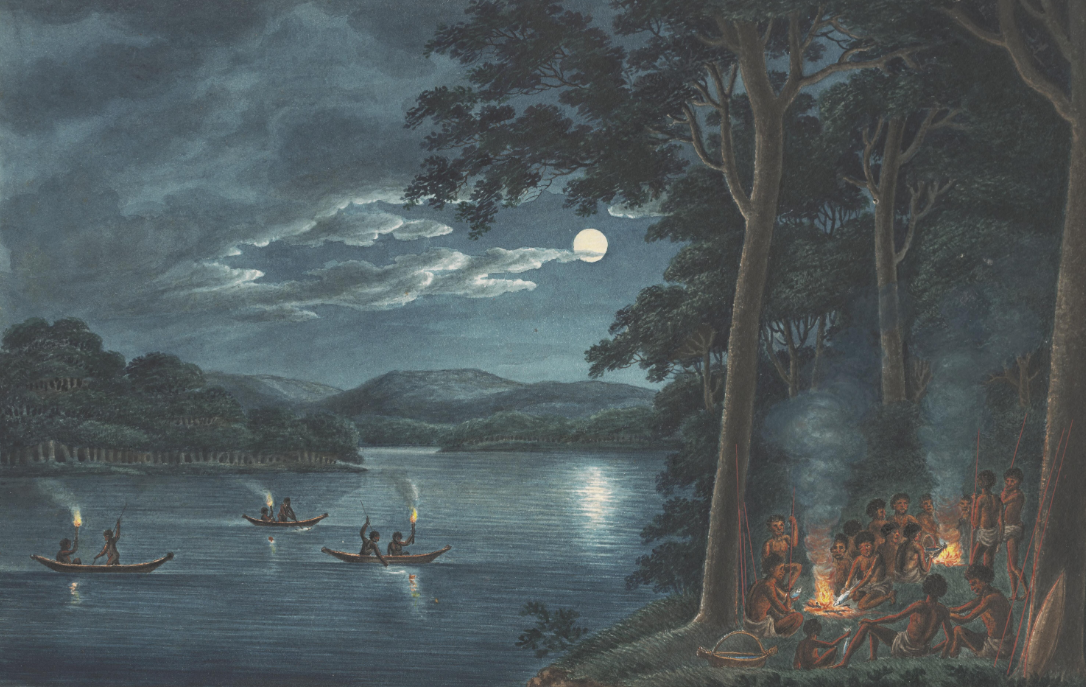
Painting of Awabakal people night fishing with fire torches on Lake Macquarie by Joseph Lycett c.1817

Lake Macquarie was first encountered by Europeans, in July 1800, by Captain William Reid, who had been tasked with obtaining a cargo of coal from the outcropping seams on the southern side of the Hunter River. Mistaking Moon Island for Nobby's and the entrance to Lake Macquarie at Swansea Heads for the mouth of the Hunter River, he obtained his cargo of coal from a seam outcropping in the southern headland at the lagoon's entrance — a headland since known as 'Reid's Mistake' — and so accidentally revealed to the settlers both the lagoon and the coastal coalfields of the area. Since the location seemed to match the description given to him, he presumed that he had reached the Hunter. It was only upon his return to Sydney that Reid found that he had not travelled far enough north to have reached the Hunter River. The name "Reid's Mistake" was used for the lagoon until 1826, when it was renamed in honour of Governor Lachlan Macquarie.

== Geography and environment ==
The lake is of irregular shape and the land separating it from the ocean is only a few kilometres wide along most of its length. While there are several small, sandy, low-level islets in the lake, some of which are grouped near the mouth, Pulbah Island, located south of Swansea is a large island offering views from rocky cliffs.

Lake Macquarie is connected to the sea by two channels, Swansea Channel and Lake Entrance. Swansea Channel is approximately 380 metres (1,247 ft) wide and 2 kilometres (1.2 mi) long. It joins Lake Entrance, which measures approximately 900 m (2,953 ft) wide by 2.2 km (1.4 mi) at the Swansea bridges. The bridges can lift to allow yachts and other larger pleasure craft into and out of the lagoon.

There is no point on the coast from which the entire expanse of the lake and its 174 km (108 mi) foreshore may be seen. However, a good view can be obtained from lookouts in the nearby Watagan Mountains.

=== Important Bird Area ===
The remnant and fragmented eucalypt forests on the southern margins of the lagoon have been identified by BirdLife International as a 121 km^{2} Important Bird Area (IBA) because they support significant numbers of endangered swift parrots and regent honeyeaters in years when the swamp mahoganies and other favoured trees are flowering. Masked owls and ospreys regularly nest within the IBA.

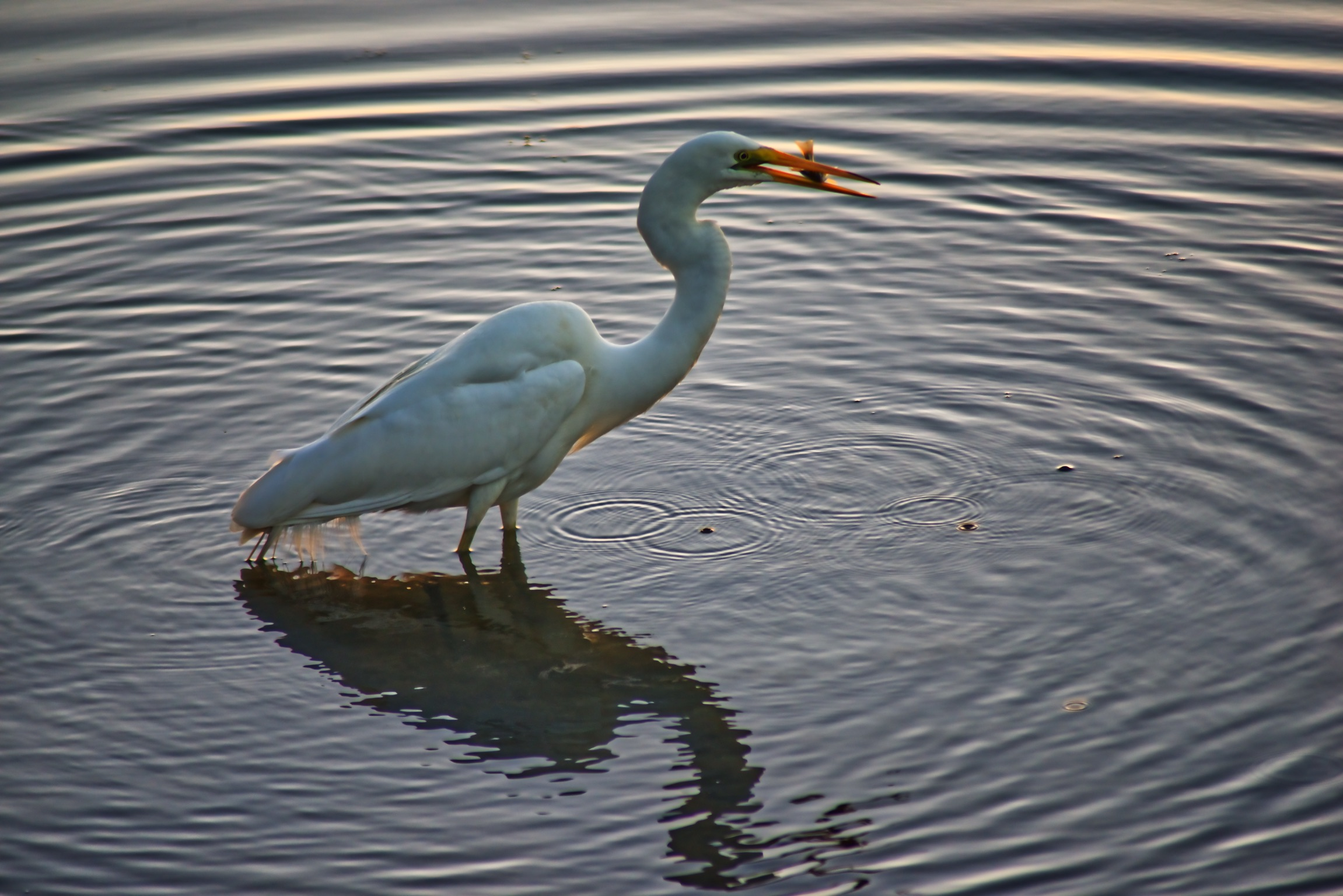
The eastern great egret catching fish in Lake Macquarie

=== Pulbah Island ===
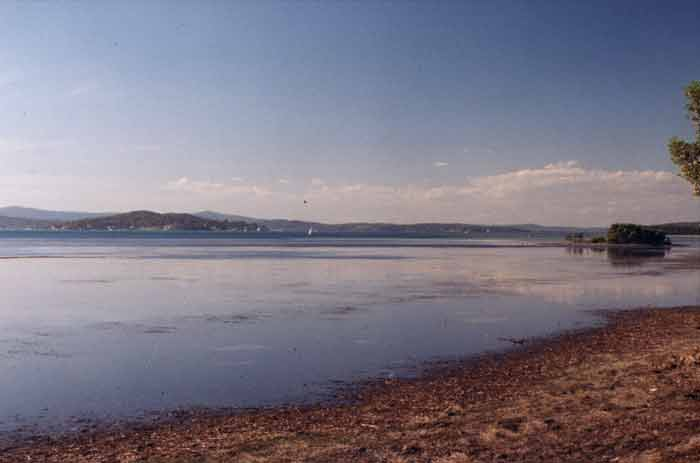
View from Swansea showing Pulbah Island

The Pulbah Island Nature Reserve is a protected 68-hectare (168-acre) nature reserve in the southern part of the lake. Being approximately 1.6 kilometres (1 mi) long the island is, by far, the largest island in Lake Macquarie.

Pulbah Island is managed by the NSW National Parks & Wildlife Service. There are no permanent structures on the island and it is uninhabited although in the past a maintenance cottage existed on the island. Pulbah is an Australian indigenous Awabakal word meaning "island".

Weed infestation on the island is problematic. Local efforts have been made to remove and control weeds species such as Bitou bush, Lantana and Wandering Jew. It also has native trees such as spotted gum.

Kangaroos and koalas were introduced to the island during the early 1900s, but they have been extirpated by illegal hunting. Goannas are common on the island.

External image
- Pulbah Island photos

From the island there are clear views of the Wangi Wangi peninsula as well as the Eraring, Munmorah and Vales Point power stations.

The island has cliff faces on the west and south sides as well as the south east side. The rest of the island is edged by sandy beaches although the density of vegetation ensures that there is minimal beach at high tide. The east side of the island has a slight bay that is commonly frequented by leisure boats. Camping on the island is not permitted. Bushwalking and picnicking are permitted.

Pulbah Island is also a sacred site in Aboriginal culture for the Awabakal people and was declared an Aboriginal place in 1982.

=== Environmental management ===
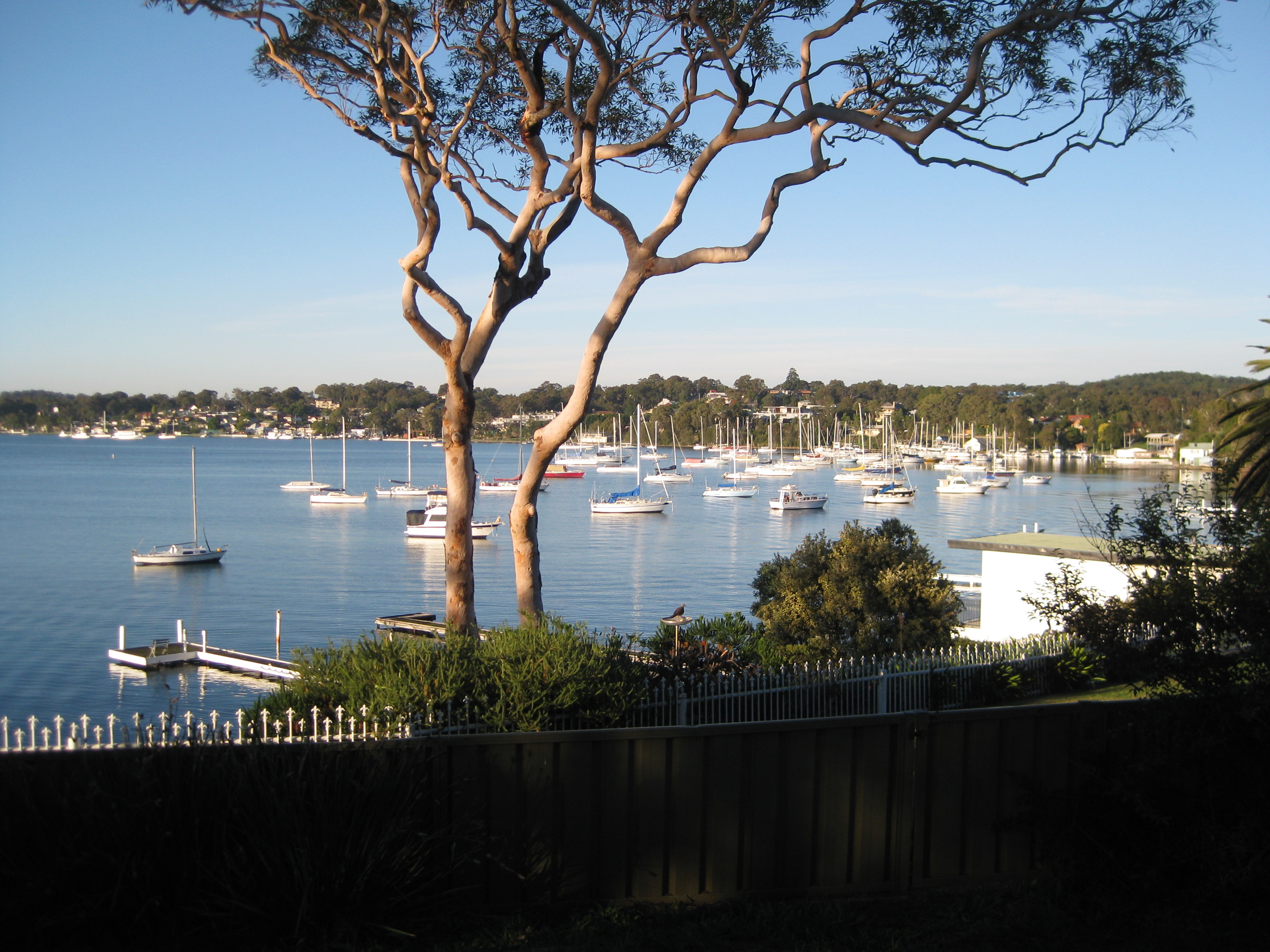
Lake Macquarie at Toronto

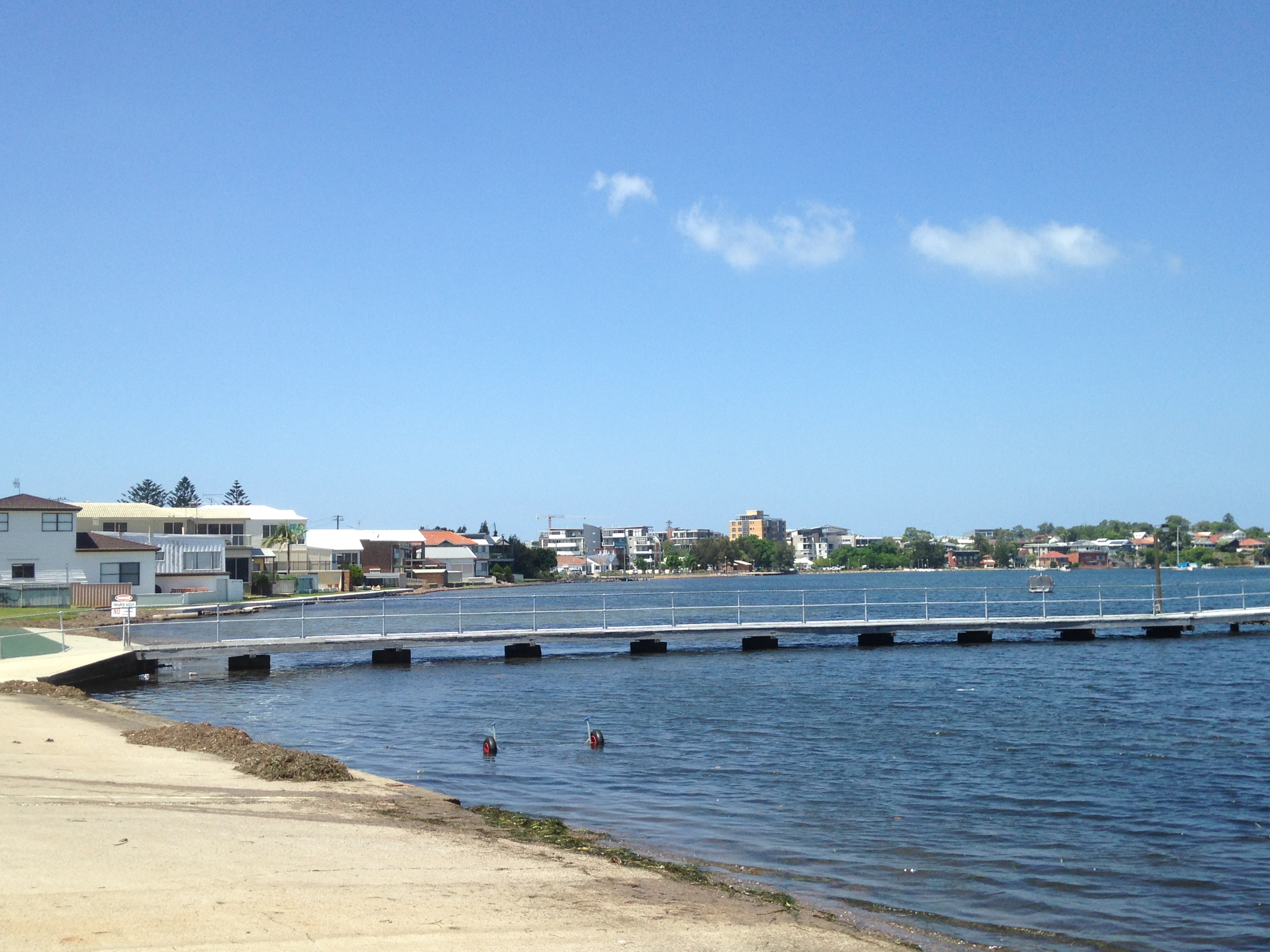
Lake Macquarie coastline at Belmont

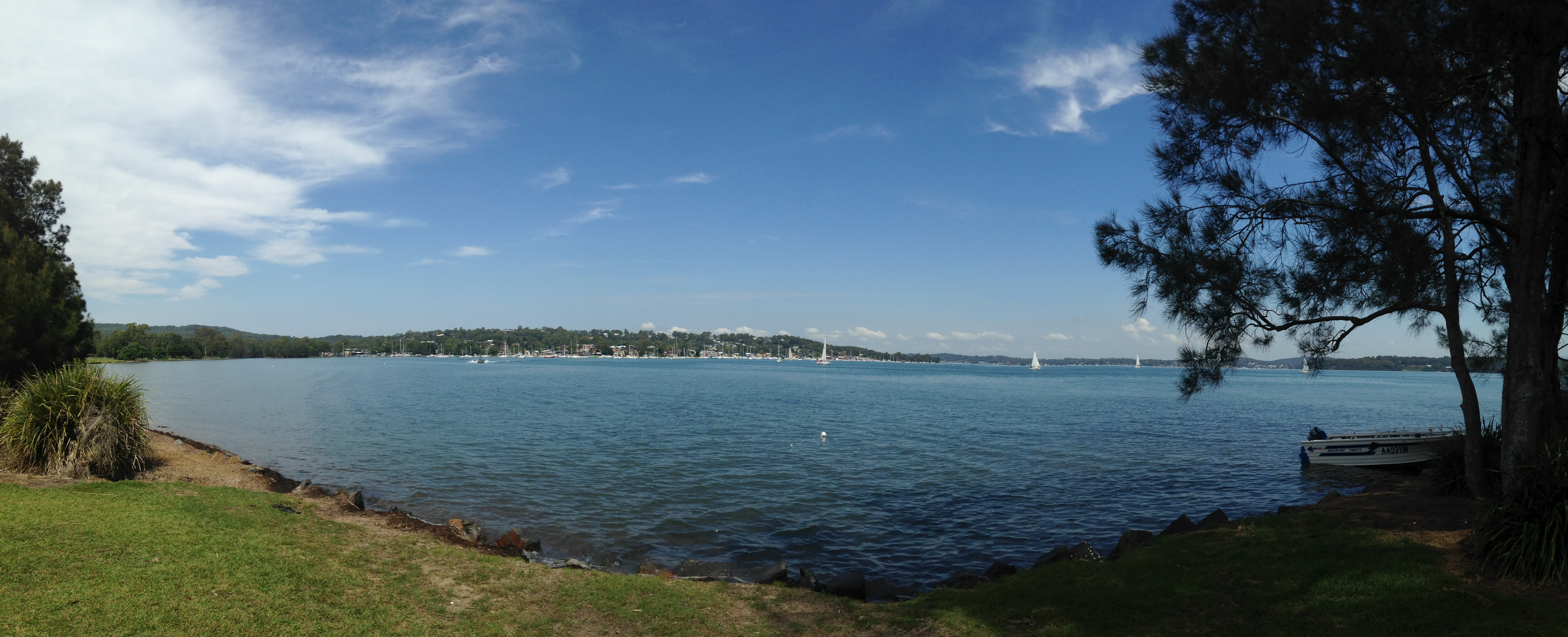
Lake Macquarie at Croudace Bay

In 1983, the State Pollution Control Commission undertook an investigation into the causes of poor water quality in the lake. The final report of this investigation, known as "The Environmental Audit of Lake Macquarie", identified the primary causes of concern, highlighting the major problems of sedimentation and nutrient enrichment. Accelerated sedimentation levels were estimated at 75,000 tonnes (73,815 long tons) per annum and nutrient levels had shown a substantial increase as a result of urbanisation. A study prepared for Lake Macquarie City Council in 1995 estimated that sediment loads to Lake Macquarie were 57,000 t (56,100 long tons) per annum, which was very different from the sediment loads prior to European development, estimated at 6,600 t (6,496 long tons) per annum. Two creek systems, Cockle and Dora Creeks, were estimated to be contributing 23,900 t (23,523 long tons) and 11,000 t (10,826 long tons) per annum respectively.

In 1998, the then NSW Premier, Bob Carr, announced the formation of a task force under the chairmanship of Clean Up Australia founder, Ian Kiernan. The report of the task force, known as the "Integrated Estuary and Catchment Management Framework" was accepted by the NSW State Cabinet in February 1999. The report recommended a unique institutional arrangement for implementation through the creation of the Office of the Lake Macquarie and Catchment Coordinator. This cooperative-based arrangement was a joint initiative of City of Lake Macquarie and the former Wyong Shire local government areas (which is now Central Coast Council) in 1998, as well as the NSW Government, with major funding provided by these partners. To oversee the implementation process, a committee known as the Lake Macquarie Project Management Committee was appointed by the then Minister of Land and Water Conservation. The Committee would consist of representatives of both councils; community; regional directors of relevant government departments and three ex-officio members.

The action plan, known as the Lake Macquarie Improvement Plan has an emphasis on integration, both physically and administratively, as well as promoting a whole of government approach and strong community involvement. The physical works concentrated on treating the cause of the water problems in the lagoon by tackling stormwater runoff within the catchment. Again, the emphasis adopted included the use of soft engineering and the restoration of natural ecological processes where possible. After six years in operation, the Lake Macquarie Project Management Committee entered its third project phase in 2006.

A series of water quality indicators are used to monitor and quantify the water quality improvements observed by the community. The lagoon body generally has low nutrient concentrations, good water clarity and excellent dissolved oxygen levels. Activities that reduce the amount of sediments and nutrients washing into the Lake via stormwater run-off have assisted in improving water quality in Lake Macquarie. These activities include the construction of wetlands, the installation of stormwater treatment devices, bush regeneration and an increased awareness by the local community.

Recreational fishing is improving as fish stocks respond to the recent removal of commercial fishing and the significant increase in water quality that has come from a concerted environmental program undertaken by the state government and council. Since settlement lake-bed silt has increased in some areas due to unsealed roads, road shoulders and diffuse effects of urbanisation, however the quantity is far less than in nearby Lake Munmorah, and swimming is quite tolerable. Average water depth is approximately 8 m (26 ft), reaching a maximum depth of approximately 15 m (49 ft) east of Pulbah Island.

The lake has an increased level of mercury.

== Recreation ==
Recreational fishing, boating, kayaking and water skiing are all popular recreational activities on the lake. The popularity of kayaking is increasing. Sailing and yacht racing are also popular with the lake boasting many yacht clubs including:

- Belmont 16 ft Sailing Club
- Lake Macquarie Yacht Club, Belmont
- Mannering Park Amateur Sailing Club
- Marmong Pt Sailing Club
- Royal Motor Yacht Club of NSW, Toronto
- Speers Point Amateur Sailing Club
- South Lake Macquarie Amateur Sailing Club
- Teralba Amateur Sailing Club
- Toronto Amateur Sailing Club Toronto
- Wangi RSL Amateur Sailing Club
