= Division of Shortland =

Australian federal electoral division

Coordinates: 33.112°S 151.617°E

Shortland Australian House of Representatives Division
- Interactive map of electorate boundaries from the 2025 federal election
- Created: 1949
- MP: Pat Conroy
- Party: Labor
- Namesake: John Shortland
- Electors: 123,058 (2025)
- Area: 204 km^{2} (78.8 sq mi)
- Demographic: Provincial
Electorates around Shortland:
Hunter	Newcastle	South Pacific Ocean
Hunter	Shortland	South Pacific Ocean
Dobell	Dobell	South Pacific Ocean

The Division of Shortland is an Australian electoral division in the state of New South Wales.

== Geography ==
The Division of Shortland covers parts of the southern Hunter region and the northern part of the Central Coast region.

Since 1984, federal electoral division boundaries in Australia have been determined at redistributions by a redistribution committee appointed by the Australian Electoral Commission. Redistributions occur for the boundaries of divisions in a particular state, and they occur every seven years, or sooner if a state's representation entitlement changes or when divisions of a state are malapportioned.

== History ==
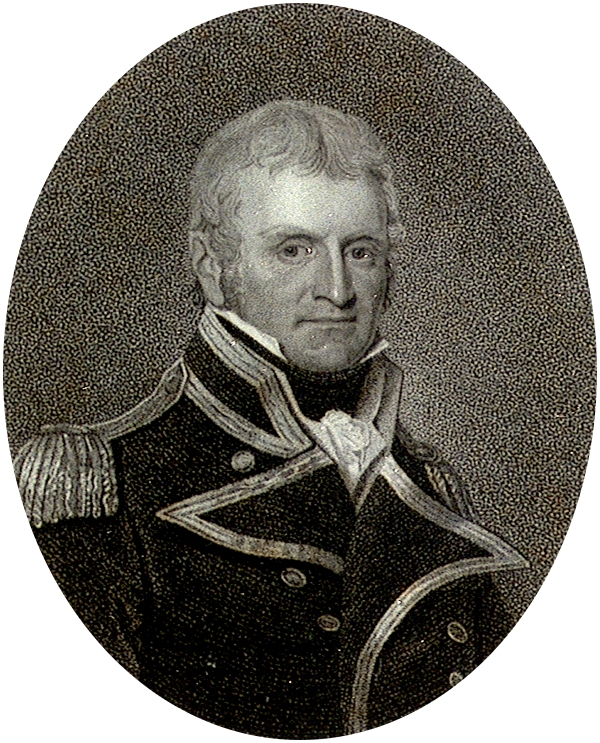
John Shortland, the division's namesake

The division is named after Lt John Shortland, an early European explorer of the Hunter Region, and was proclaimed at the redistribution of 11 May 1949, and was first contested at the 1949 federal election.

The division closely follows the west coast of the Tasman Sea, on average extending only 5 or 10 kilometres (3.1 or 6.2 mi) inland. Much of the western boundary is formed by Lake Macquarie. Shortland covers an area from Highfields, Cardiff and Boolaroo in the north to Budgewoi and San Remo in the south.

The current Member for Shortland, since the 2016 federal election, is Pat Conroy, a member of the Australian Labor Party.

The seat has been held by Labor since its creation; like most seats in the Hunter Region, it has usually been reasonably safe for that party.

== Members ==
Image	Member	Party	Term	Notes
	Charles Griffiths (1903–1982)	Labor	10 December 1949 – 2 November 1972	Retired
	Peter Morris (1932–2026)	Labor	2 December 1972 – 31 August 1998	Served as minister under Hawke. Retired
	Jill Hall (1949–)	Labor	3 October 1998 – 9 May 2016	Previously held the New South Wales Legislative Assembly seat of Swansea. Retired
	Pat Conroy (1979–)	Labor	2 July 2016 – present	Previously held the Division of Charlton. Incumbent. Currently a minister under Albanese

== Election results ==
2025 Australian federal election: Shortland
Party	Candidate	Votes	%	±%
Labor	Pat Conroy	48,222	44.61	+4.45
Liberal	Emma King	28,331	26.21	−4.96
Greens	Therese Doyle	12,257	11.34	+1.43
One Nation	Barry Reed	9,813	9.08	+2.66
Independent	James Pheils	4,805	4.44	+4.44
Family First	Pietro Di Girolamo	2,958	2.74	+2.74
Libertarian	Geoffrey Robertson	1,722	1.59	−1.30
Total formal votes		108,108	94.14	+0.27
Informal votes		6,731	5.86	−0.27
Turnout		114,839	93.39	+2.22
Two-party-preferred result
Labor	Pat Conroy	66,494	61.51	+5.51
Liberal	Emma King	41,614	38.49	−5.51
Labor hold		Swing	+5.51	

2022 Australian federal election: Shortland
Party	Candidate	Votes	%	±%
Labor	Pat Conroy	40,135	40.02	−1.11
Liberal	Nell McGill	32,215	32.12	−5.25
Greens	Kim Grierson	9,910	9.88	+1.62
One Nation	Quintin King	6,397	6.38	+6.38
United Australia	Kenneth Maxwell	3,125	3.12	−1.41
Liberal Democrats	Barry Reed	2,984	2.98	+2.98
Animal Justice	Bree Roberts	2,979	2.97	−0.63
Independent	Basil Paynter	2,554	2.55	+2.55
Total formal votes		100,299	93.94	+0.35
Informal votes		6,467	6.06	−0.35
Turnout		106,766	91.85	−1.81
Two-party-preferred result
Labor	Pat Conroy	55,985	55.82	+1.37
Liberal	Nell McGill	44,314	44.18	−1.37
Labor hold		Swing	+1.37	

Alluvial diagram for preference flows in the seat of Shortland in the 2022 federal election. indicates at what stage the winning candidate had over 50% of the votes and was declared the winner.
