= 2013–14 Australian bushfire season =

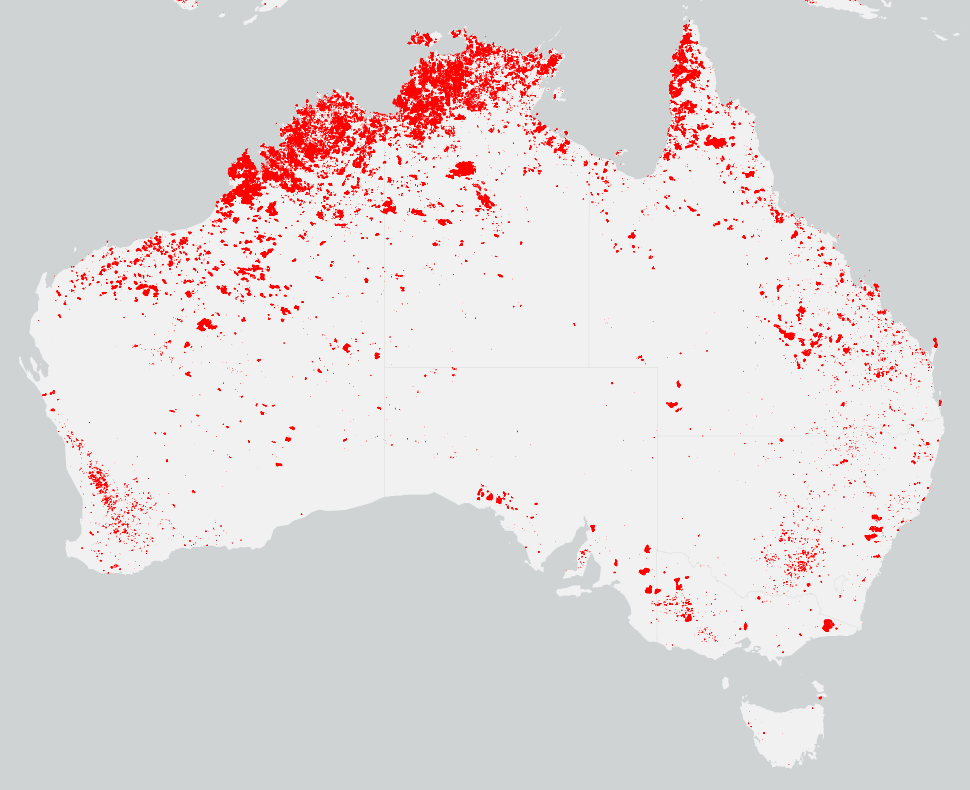
- NASA MODIS burned area detections from June 2013 to May 2014
- Date: Winter (June) 2013 – Autumn (May) 2014
- Location: Australia

Impacts
- Deaths: 4 total: 1 pilot contracted by the NSW Rural Fire Service (in accident); 3 other
- Structures destroyed: 571+ total: 371 houses; 200+ non-residential structures

The summer of 2013–14 was at the time, the most destructive bushfire season in terms of property loss since the 2008–09 Australian bushfire season, with the loss of 371 houses and several hundred non-residential buildings as a result of wild fires between 1 June 2015 and 31 May 2016. The season also suffered four fatalities; two died in New South Wales, one in Western Australia and one in Victoria. One death was as a direct result of fire, two died due to unrelated health complications while fighting fires on their property, and a pilot contracted by the New South Wales Rural Fire Service died during an accident.

== Climate summary and predictions ==
The season was predicted to have above average fire potential for most states including portions of the north west of Western Australia, the north west of the Northern Territory and large areas of central Queensland following below average rainfall and above average temperatures in these areas in the months leading up to the fire season. The year 2013 was the hottest on record in Australia, with the average temperature from September 2012 to August 2013 being calculated to be 22.9 °C (73 °F) which is 1.1 °C (1.6 °F) higher than the 1961 to 1990 average.

== Fires of note ==
State	Start date	Deaths	Injuries	Res. houses lost	Other structures lost	Area (ha)	Local govt.	Impacted communities	Duration	Ref.
NSW	10 September 2013		7+	1	several	150	Blacktown	Marsden Park		
NSW	28 September 2013	1		4	15	2,600	Central Coast	Cams Wharf, Catherine Hill Bay, Lake Munmorah & Nords Wharf	23 days	(Note: Significant fire-weather/destruction on 17 October 2013.)
NSW	13 October 2013			2	several	180	Hawkesbury	Webbs Creek		
NSW	13 October 2013			4	33	6,600†	Port Stephens	Heatherbrae, Raymond Terrace, Salt Ash, Tomago & Williamtown	10 days	
NSW	16 October 2013			5	several	55,000	Blue Mountains	Bell, Clarence, Lithgow, Mount Irvine & Mount Wilson	28 days	
NSW	17 October 2013		2	195	numerous	3,600	Blue Mountains	Faulconbridge, Springwood, Winmalee & Yellow Rock	27 days	
NSW	17 October 2013		1	10	several	9,400	Blue Mountains	Mount Victoria	22 days	
NSW	17 October 2013			2	10	15,700	Wollondilly	Balmoral, Bargo & Yanderra	26 days	
NSW	24 October 2013	1				4,000	Queanbeyan–Palerang	Wirritin		
WA	12 January 2014	1	1	57	several	390	Mundaring	Mount Helena, Stoneville & Parkerville	4 days	
SA	14 January 2014		24	5	several	35,000	Mount Remarkable	Laura, Wirrabara & Stone Hut	30 days	
SA	14 January 2014			1	several	4,500	Murray Bridge	Rockleigh	3 days	
VIC	14 January 2014				1	15	Mornington Peninsula	Dromana	1 day	
Vic	15 January 2014	1		32	90	55,100	Northern Grampians	Brimpaen, Halls Gap, Heathvale, Laharum, Pomonal, Roses Gap & Wartook	62 days	(Note: Significant fire-weather/destruction on 16 and 17 January 2014.)
Vic	16 January 2014			9	several	165,800	East Gippsland	Bonang, Deddick, Goongerah & Tubbut	70 days	(Note: Significant fire-weather/destruction on 9 February 2014.)
Vic	16 January 2014			3	7	6,900	East Gippsland	Boundary Track, Fernbank, Fingerboards, Glenaladale & Mount Ray	67 days	
NSW	17 January 2014			5	several	12,000	Wagga Wagga	Carabost, Humula & Kyeamba		
SA	17 January 2014			4	several	25,000	Barossa	Angaston, Cambrai, Eden Valley, Keyneton, Sedan, Springton and Truro	16 days	
VIC	9 February 2014			18	several	22,900	Hume, Macedon Ranges & Mitchell	Beveridge, Bylands, Chintin, Craigieburn, Darraweit Guim, Donnybrook, Kalkallo, Kilmore, Mickleham, Moranding & Wallan	6 days	
VIC	9 February 2014			5	47	2,800	Macedon Ranges	Gisborne, Gisborne South, Romsey & Sunbury		
VIC	9 February 2014			3		10	Manningham	Warrandyte		
VIC	9 February 2014			3	several	9,300	Moira	Bunbartha, Numurkah & Wunghnu		
VIC	9 February 2014			2	several	2,900	Wellington	Jack River		
VIC	9 February 2014			1	1	270	Central Goldfields	Bealiba & Emu		
VIC	9 February 2014		1000+		several	3,300†	Latrobe	Morwell	45 days	

- † – A series of separate fires in close proximity.

== Fires by state or territory ==
=== New South Wales ===
September

During August and September a total 2,322 active fires were recorded across the state.

On 9–10 September, 59 fires ignited around the western suburbs of Sydney during one of the earliest starts to a fire season in several years. A 150 ha (370 acres) fire in Marsden Park destroyed one house and several sheds. Three houses were damaged and a Western Sydney University campus was evacuated as a result of other fires burning near Castlereagh, Londonderry and Windsor Downs. Approximately 800 firefighters and 200 appliances attended the blazes; two firefighters were injured while combating the Marsden Park blaze and another five were treated for smoke inhalation.

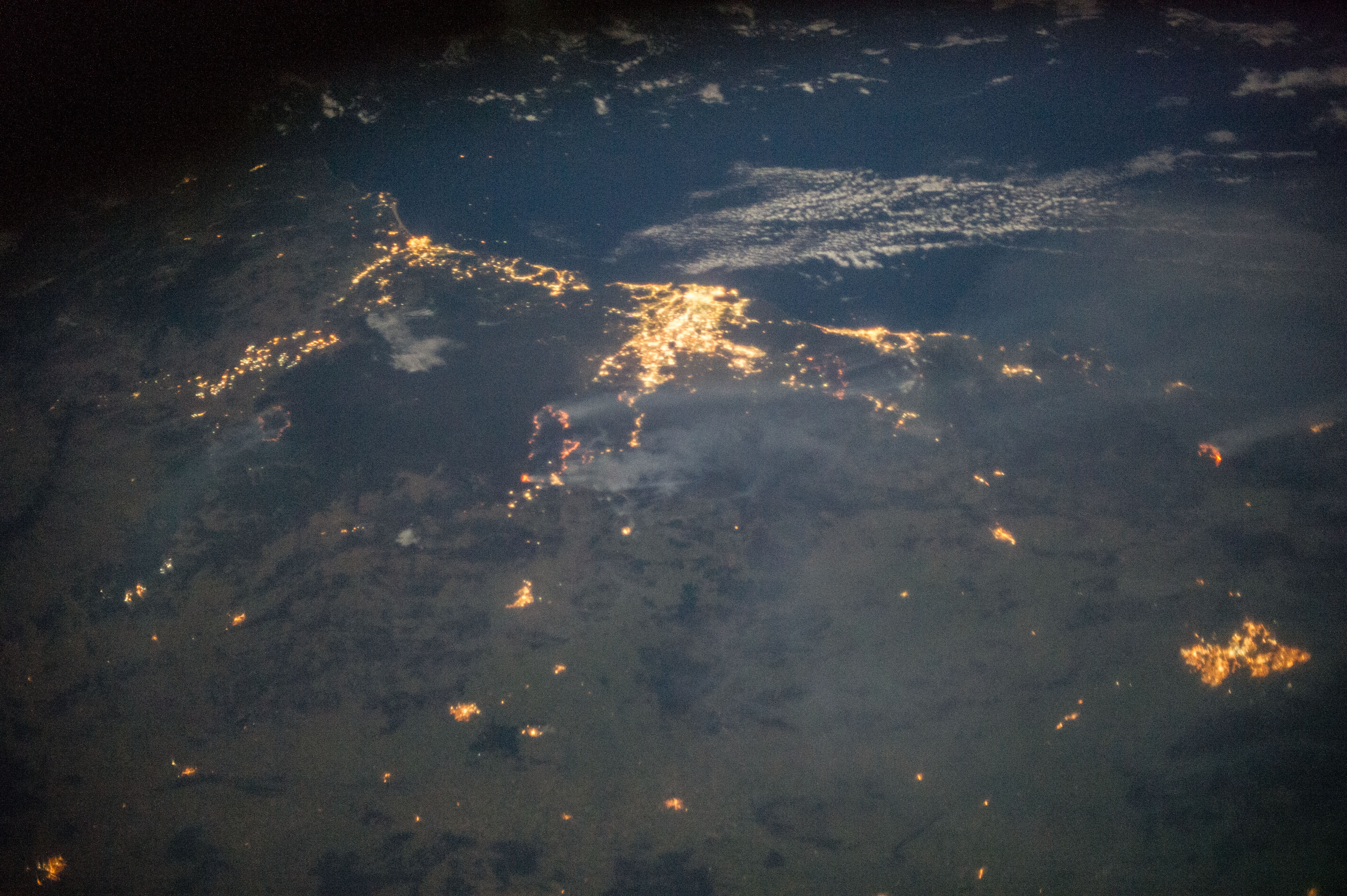
Fires and smoke plumes around the Sydney region of New South Wales, 19 October 2013

On 28 September, a fire ignited on Barrenjoey headland, destroying 60 percent of the scrub and forest on the headland and damaging the roof of the cottage attached to historic Barrenjoey Head Lighthouse and a second building in the lighthouse complex. Approximately 80 firefighters and three aircraft were required to bring the blaze under control by the following day. Communities around Taree were also threatened by fire on 28 September; several sheds and outbuildings were destroyed by a blaze that burned 1,674 ha (4,140 acres).

Another fire ignited in coal tailings from local mining operations near Ruttleys Rd., Doyalson, during September; the hot-spots were observed by the RFS several weeks before, but could not be extinguished before hot conditions on 17 October. The fire would eventually burn over 2,600 ha (6,400 acres) and impact property in Cams Wharf, Catherine Hill Bay, Lake Munmorah and Nords Wharf, destroying 4 houses and damaging a further 7. 63-year-old retiree Walter Linder died of a suspected heart-attack while defending his home during the fire.

October

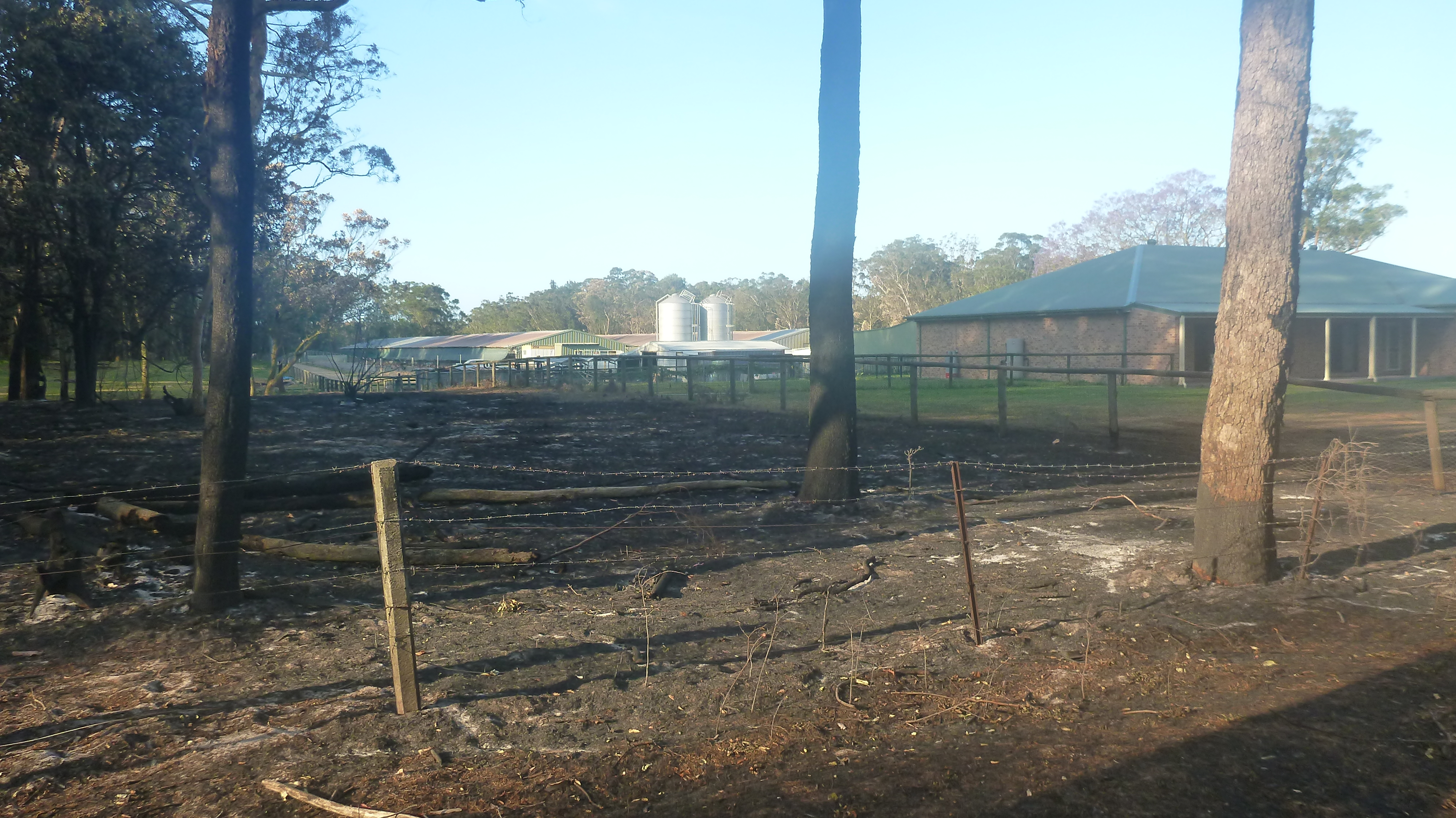
Homes in Campvale, near Port Stephens, following the Hank St. bushfire

During October 2013, 1,162 fires were recorded in New South Wales, 19 of these being declared major incidents.

On 13 October, a small grass fire burned through the car park of the Aquatic Centre at Sydney Olympic Park, near the Rural Fire Service Headquarters, destroying 47 cars and a motorbike and damaging a further 33. The evacuation plan of the Aquatic Centre was employed and 500 to 1,500 people were safely moved away from danger by staff of the complex where the 2013 Buffalo Sports NSW All Schools Championships were taking place. On the same day, two houses were destroyed and another damaged by a 180 ha (440 acres) fire that ignited in the Webbs Creek area, west of Gosford.

Three fires ignited around the Port Stephens area on 13 October, destroying a total of 4 houses, 9 industrial/commercial/primary production buildings, 24 outbuildings and eight vehicles over a 10-day period; a further 9 houses and 10 industrial/commercial/primary production buildings were significantly damaged, also. The first fire, near Fingal Bay, burned 184 ha (450 acres). The second fire, ignited by powerlines arcing in high winds near Brownes Rd. and Lemon Tree Passage Rd. in Salt Ash, burned 355 ha (880 acres) and destroyed four houses, a number of sheds, outbuildings, vehicles and boats. The third fire, which ignited near Hank St. in Heatherbrae, burned 5,642 ha (13,940 acres) and impacted on property in Raymond Terrace, Tomago and Williamtown on 17 October when driven by winds of 45 km/h (28 mph), gusting up to 70 km/h (43 mph). More than 500 residents registered for assistance at the King Park, Raymond Terrace bushfire evacuation centre during the Hank St. fire.

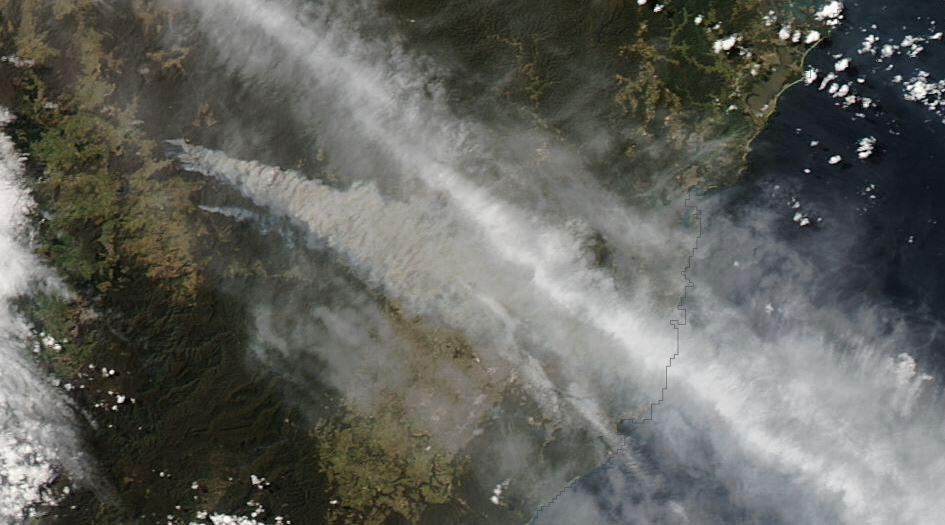
The State Mine, Mt. York Road and Linksview Road fires viewed from the NASA Aqua Satellite on 17 October 2013

On 16 October, a fire—later referred to as the State Mine fire—ignited on the grounds of the Marangaroo Army base during an explosives exercise. Firefighters were unable to combat the fire due to the danger of unexploded ordnance in the area and the presence of a no fly zone above the base. The blaze rapidly spread into rugged, largely inaccessible, country containing heavy fuel loads. Over a period of four weeks, the fire burned through 54,862 ha (135,570 acres) of scrub and forest, the majority in Wollemi and Blue Mountains National Parks. Significant damage was caused to the infrastructure of the historic Zig Zag Railway, estimated to have cost A$3–4 million; eleven engines and carriages and numerous structures for accommodation and administration were destroyed. A total of 5 houses were destroyed and one damaged across the fire ground—including 2 destroyed in Mount Wilson, some 20 km (12 mi) from the point of ignition—7 businesses and numerous sheds and vehicles were also destroyed in Bell, Clarence, Lithgow, Mount Irvine and other communities affected by the fires.

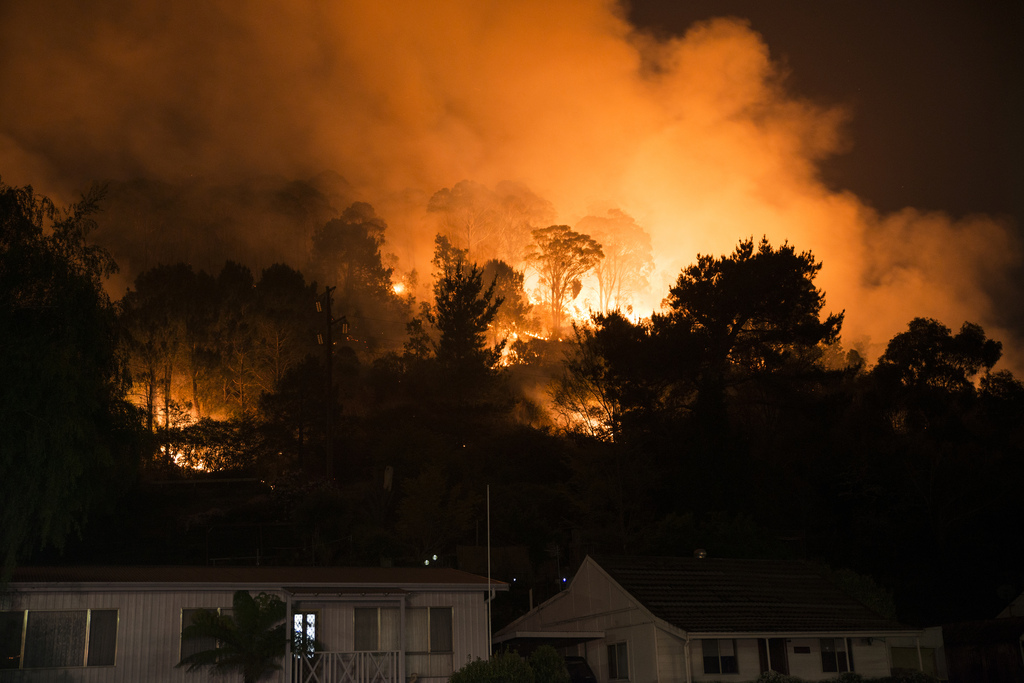
Fires to the north of Lithgow, New South Wales October 2013

The most destructive single bushfire in terms of property loss in the history of New South Wales ignited in the vicinity of Linksview Rd., Springwood, at about midday on 17 October. A total of 3,631 ha (8,970 acres) of forest and private property was burned during the 27-day duration of the fire, which destroyed 195 houses and damaged a further 146 buildings in the communities of Faulconbridge, Mount Riverview, Springwood, Winmalee and Yellow Rock. A significant amount of destruction occurred in the initial hours of the fire around Buena Vista Rd., Emma Pde., Heather Glen Rd., Moray St. and Purvines Rd. A number of houses were also destroyed in Paulwood Ave., close to St. Thomas Aquinas Primary School, which was evacuated to Winmalee Shopping Centre and destruction also occurred on Singles Ridge Rd., where the children of Rainbow Pre-School were evacuated and the playground was destroyed.

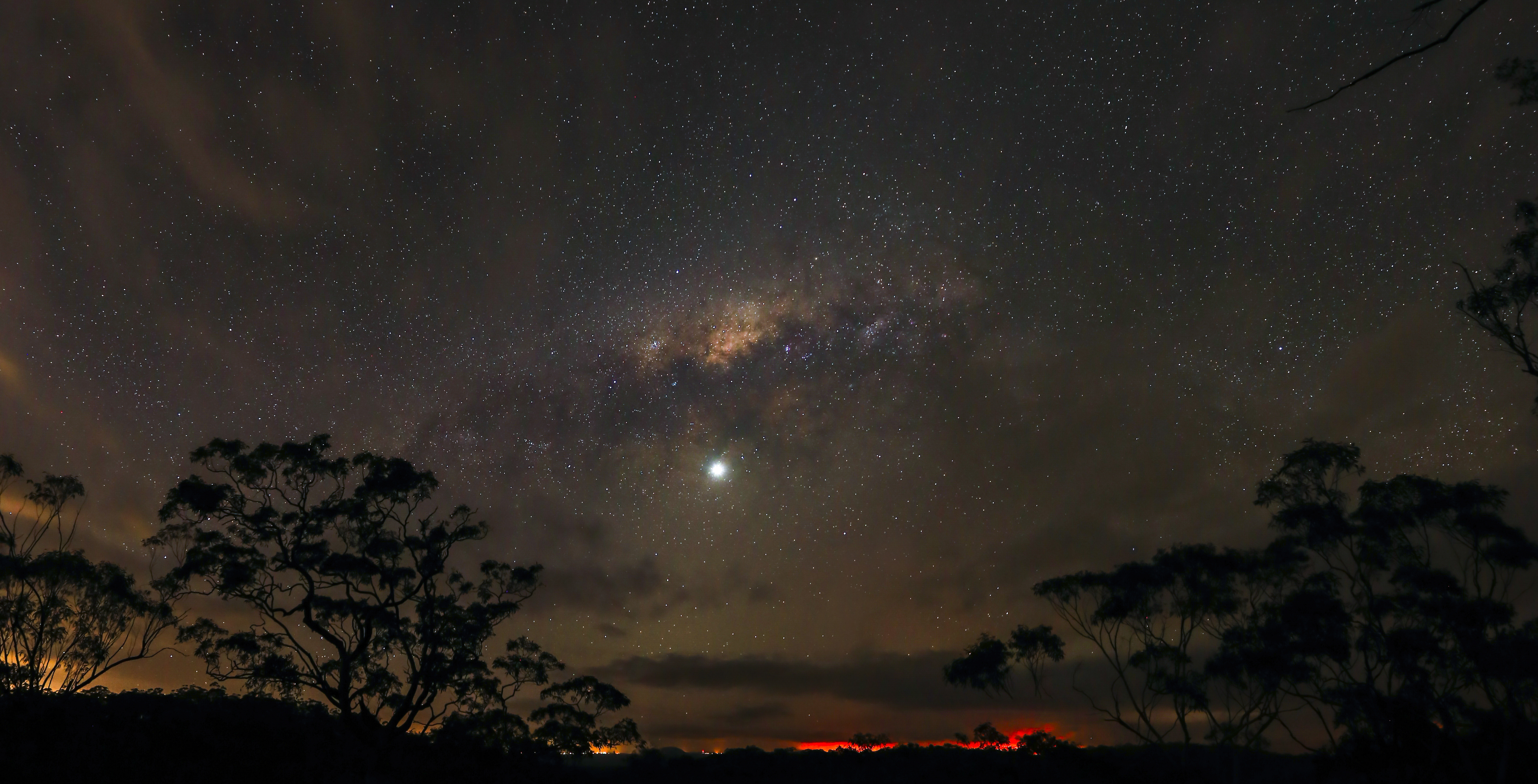
The Milky Way and Venus viewed above a bushfire in New South Wales on 26 October

Also on 17 October, two other significant fires ignited; one near Mt. York Rd. in Mount Victoria and another near Hall Rd. in Balmoral.

Over 22-day period the 'Mt. York Rd.' fire burned 9,383 ha (23,190 acres) of scrub and forest, the majority within the boundaries of the Blue Mountains National Park. All property losses occurred on the first afternoon of the blaze; 10 houses were destroyed and a further 3 were damaged in St. George's Parade, Mount Victoria, and a number of smaller structures and vehicles were destroyed in other streets around the town. From 18 to 24 October, there was concern that the fire could enter the Grose Valley and impact on Katoomba and the lower Blue Mountains, however a 5 km (3.1 mi) containment line, constructed by specialized and experienced RFS Remote Areas Firefighting Teams in a narrow ravine, prevented the fire from entering.

Over a 26-day period the 'Hall Rd.' fire burned 15,657 ha (38,690 acres) of forest within the Upper Nepean State Conservation Area and impacted the communities of Balmoral, Cordeaux-Dam and Yanderra; 2 houses were destroyed and another 2 were damaged. The fire had a significant effect on infrastructure, closing the Hume Motorway—creating a traffic jam reputed to have been 20 km (12 mi) in length—and disrupting electrical supply to the water filtration plant for the Upper Nepean Catchment, which services four dams of Sydney's Water Catchment. Also threatened were Cordeaux colliery, a gas pipeline and communications tower.

On 24 October, a pilot contracted by the RFS died in a fixed-wing aircraft accident while fighting a fire in rugged terrain near Wirritin, approximately 40 km (25 mi) west of Ulladulla.

January

On 17 January, at least 50 fires were ignited in New South Wales by lightning strikes. The most destructive of these blazes burned 8,000 ha (20,000 acres) in and around Murraguldrie State Forest and impacted upon the communities of Carabost, Humula, Kyeamba and Little Billabong over a period of days; 5 houses and a number of non-residential structures were destroyed. Significant damage was also caused to local forestry, costing about A$3 million to replace. In addition, a fire near Bathurst burned through 300 ha (740 acres) of pine forest and fires near Minjary claimed over 2,675 ha (6,610 acres) of scrubland.

=== Queensland ===
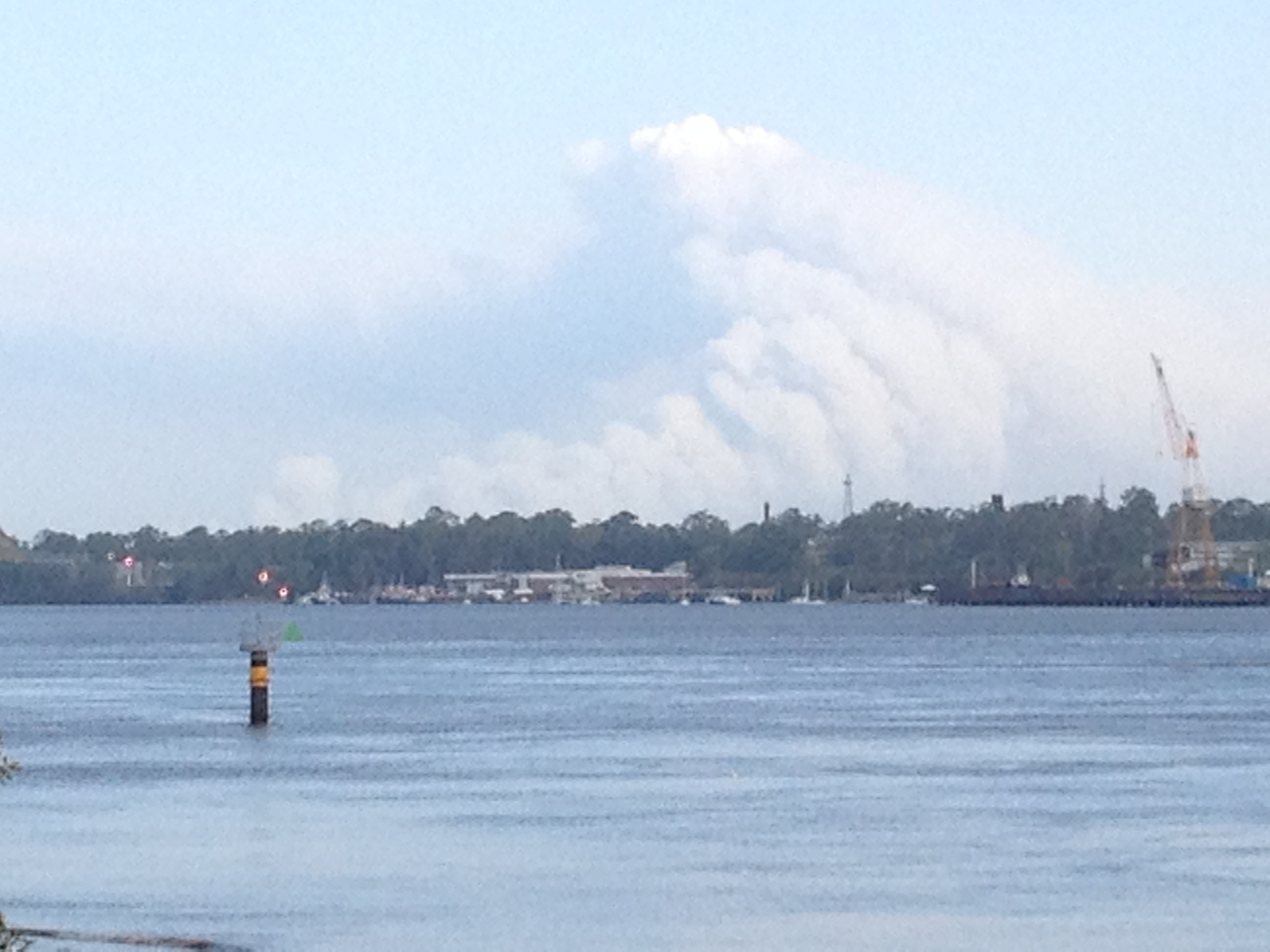
Smoke from a bushfire on North Stradbroke Island on 3 January

December & January

On 29 December, lightning ignited a fire on Stradbroke Island that consumed over 16,200 ha (40,000 acres) of bushland during a 17-day period. At least 850 campers were evacuated from Main Beach on 1 January and residents between Gatumba St. and Beehive Rd. were evacuated on 4 January after a fire near Myora broke containment lines. Significant damage was caused to power infrastructure and the majority of settlements on the island lost power, however no houses were destroyed in the blaze.

=== South Australia ===
December

On 21 December, temperatures of up to 43 °C (109 °F) and strong winds caused a bushfire between Culburra and Tintinara to burn out of control. Over 35,000 ha (86,000 acres) of grassland was burned and a hay shed was destroyed.

January

On 14 January, lightning ignited a number of serious fires across the state. The most destructive fire in terms of property loss ignited in inaccessible and difficult terrain 25 km (16 mi) north-east of Port Pirie. During a 31-day period, the fire burned 35,000 ha (86,000 acres) of scrub, forest and pasture and impacted the communities of Bangor, Laura, Stone Hut and Wirrabara; 5 houses, a timber mill, a number of sheds and 75% of the pine plantation in Wirrabara Forest were destroyed and at least 700 head of livestock died. 24 minor injuries were recorded by Country Fire Service personnel, most involving smoke inhalation and heat exhaustion. A second destructive fire also ignited near Rockleigh, in the Murray Bridge municipality, and burned through open country into scrubland. During a 4-day period, the fire burned 4,500 ha (11,000 acres) of land; 1 house and significant quantities of feed, water and fencing were destroyed. Other fires ignited the same day near Ceduna and burned at least 46,000 ha (110,000 acres) of land within Pureba, Yellabinna, Yumbarra and Watraba Conservation Parks over a 4-day period.

Just after midday on 17 January, a fire ignited from a rekindle of a lightning strike in the Eden Valley. The fire spread under the influence of strong north-westerly winds and then an intense southerly wind change, with gusts over 120 km/h (75 mph), pushed the fire northwards. During a 16-day period, the fire burned 25,000 ha (62,000 acres) of scrub, forest and pasture and impacted the communities of Angaston, Cambrai, Keyneton, Sedan, Springton and Truro; 4 houses and significant quantities of feed, water and fencing were destroyed.

=== Victoria ===
Between December and April, at least 4,600 fires burned more than 463,000 ha (1,140,000 acres) hectares of public and private land; livestock losses exceeded 21,000 head, almost 3,000 km (1,900 mi) of fencing was destroyed, more than 8,000 tonnes of hay and grain storage and in excess of 22,000 ha (54,000 acres) of pasture, crop and plantation were affected by fire. Between 7 November and 11 March, Total Fire Bans were declared in all or parts of the state on 17 days.

January

The most destructive fire in terms of property loss during the Victorian season ignited on 14 January near Pohlners Rd., Wartook, and burned into the Grampians National Park. During the major run of the fire between 15 and 20 January, a 12 km (7.5 mi) wide pyrocumulus convection column of smoke and ash was created by the fire, generating its own weather pattern including lightning. Over an 81-day period, the fire burned 55,100 ha (136,000 acres) of scrub, forest and pasture and impacted the communities of Brimpaen, Halls Gap, Heatherlie, Heathvale, Laharum, Ledcourt, Pomonal, Roses Gap & Wartook; 32 houses, 90 sheds, 300 km (190 mi) of fencing and 400 ha (990 acres) of plantations were destroyed by the fire and at least 4,000 head of livestock died during the blaze and after. On 17 January, the body of a civilian woman was found in a property at Roses Gap—her death was confirmed to have been fire related. Two additional civilians were admitted to hospital with injuries related to the fire.

The largest fire during the Victorian season ignited on 16 January as a number of separate fires—the 'Goongerah complex' and 'Club Terrace' fires being the most serious—in mountainous terrain of the Snowy River and Errinundra National Parks in the East Gippsland region. A significant commitment of aircraft, including 9 helicopters and 5 fixed-wing aircraft, supported by an additional 6 RFS aircraft provided during February, were deployed to the fires in the remote region. During a 70-day period, the smaller fires merged and burned 165,806 ha (409,720 acres) of scrub, forest and pasture and impacted the communities of Bonang, Goongerah and Tubbut; 9 houses, a number of sheds and 1,250 ha (3,100 acres) of crops and pasture were destroyed, and 100 head of livestock died.

A second complex of fires also ignited north of Glenaladale on 16 January. By 18 January these fires were 3 km (1.9 mi) south-west of the Glenaladale community, however all were contained the following day. The fire broke containment lines on 9 February, a day with recorded temperatures of up to 41.7 °C (107.1 °F) and an average daily wind speed of 44 km/h (27 mph) in the area. During a 67-day period, the blaze burned 6,727 ha (16,620 acres) of forest within the Mitchell River National Park and on private property, as well as impacting the communities of Fernbank, Fingerboards, Glenaladale and Mount Ray; 3 houses and 7 non-residential structures were destroyed and 1,000 head of livestock died.

February

Strong winds and high temperatures of on 9 February lead to the ignition of 78 separate fires, which resulted the issuing of 150 emergency warnings during the day.

The most serious fire to start during the day ignited when a tree fell on a powerline along Mickleham Rd., Mickelham. The fire spread rapidly north and threatened 1,240 houses and 13,000 residents within the eventual footprint of the fire. At least 810 firefighters, supported by 15 aircraft, battled to contain the fire as it crossed the boundaries of 3 local government areas, and on 14 February the fire was declared under control. During a 23-day period, the fire burned 22,877 ha (56,530 acres) of scrub, forest and private property and impacted the communities of Beveridge, Bylands, Chintin, Craigieburn, Darraweit Guim, Donnybrook, Kalkallo, Kilmore, Mickleham, Moranding & Wallan; 18 houses, numerous non-residential buildings, 1,600 km (990 mi) of fencing and 9,000 ha (22,000 acres) of pasture and horticulture were destroyed by the fire and at least 16,000 head of livestock died during the blaze and after.

A complex of fires also ignited around Morwell between 7–9 February, burning approximately 3,300 ha (8,200 acres) and impacting the 1,165 ha (2,880 acres) open cut portion of the Hazelwood coal mine managed by GDF Suez. The coal dredgers and conveyor belts feeding the coal-fired generators were damaged by fire and were briefly shut down, and the fire also had a significant impact to the health of residents and firefighting personnel during its 45-day duration. Of the 28 firefighting personnel who required medical assistance, 26 were treated for exposure to carbon monoxide; 14 from the CFA and 12 from GDF Suez. General practitioner practices in Churchill, Moe, Morwell and Traralgon reported an increase in consultations related to respiratory conditions, including breathing difficulties, asthma, chronic obstructive pulmonary disease exacerbation, coughing or throat irritations. Between 9 February and 10 March, 46 calls related to respiratory problems were taken within Morwell and Traralgon by the Nurse-On-Call service; approximately 30 more than on the same period in years prior.

Other destructive fires that ignited across the state on 9 February included;

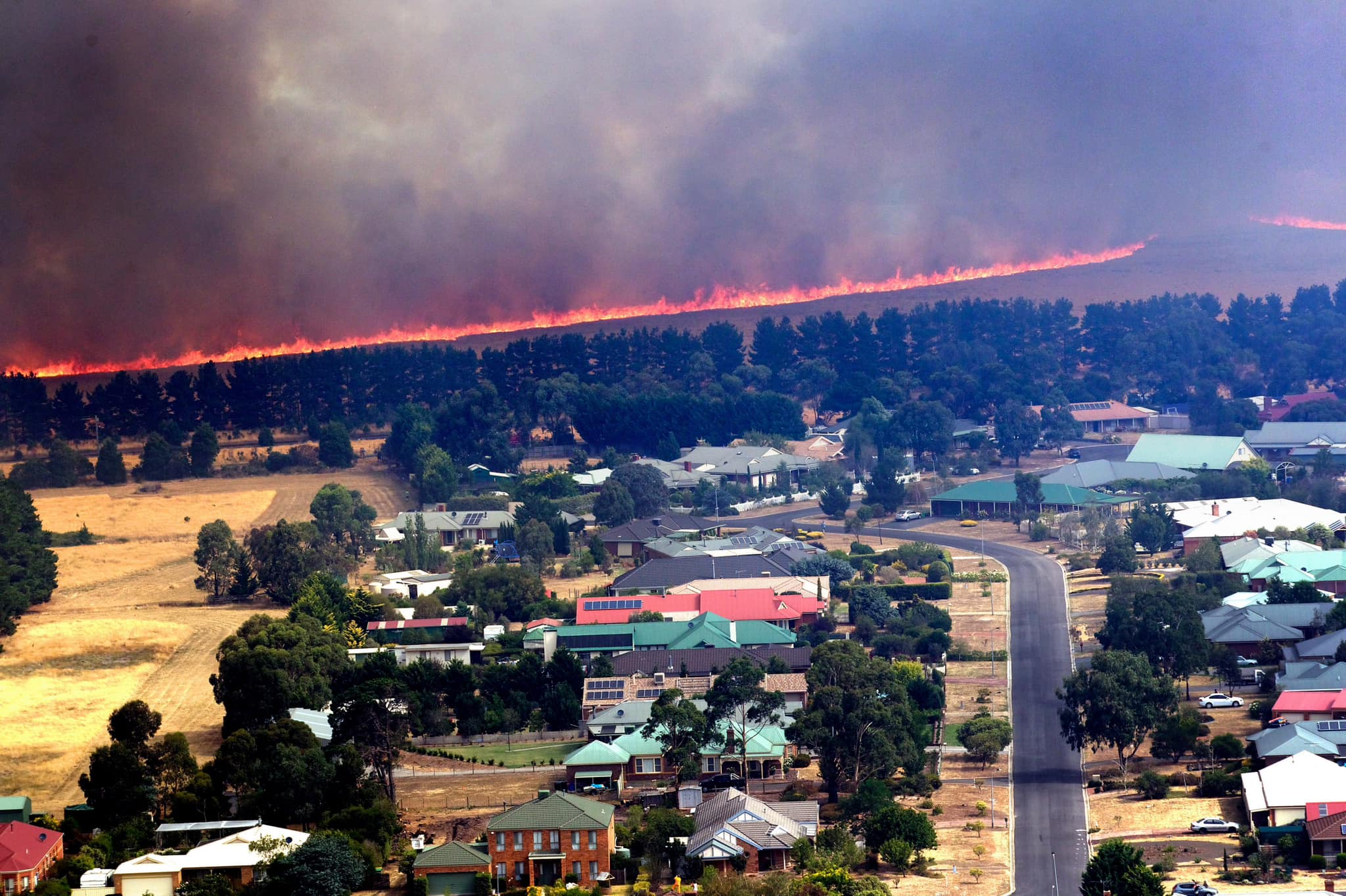
A bushfire threatens hundreds of homes at Riddells Creek on 9 February 2014.

- A fire that ignited along Dalrymple Rd., Gisborne South, and burned 2,585 ha (6,390 acres) of scrub, forest and private property, impacting the communities of Gisborne, Gisborne South, Riddells Creek and Sunbury. 140 properties were damaged and 5 houses, 47 non-residential buildings, 160 km (99 mi) of fencing and 760 ha (1,900 acres) of pasture and horticulture were destroyed. The Premier Denis Napthine said "This fire went right to the edge of Riddells Creek. If the fire had got into Riddells Creek and got on to Mount Macedon it would have been an absolute disaster." The fire was believed to have been deliberately lit.
- A suspicious fire that ignited at a number of separate ignition points along Kaarima Rd. and the Goulburn Valley Hwy., Wunghnu, and burned 9,283 ha (22,940 acres) of scrub, forest and private property, impacting the communities of Bunbartha, Numurkah and Wunghnu. Between 250 and 300 properties were damaged and 3 houses, several non-residential buildings, 330 km (210 mi) of fencing and 2,000 ha (4,900 acres) of pasture and horticulture were destroyed.
- A fire that ignited in Warrandyte and burned 11 ha (27 acres) of scrub and private property, impacting houses along Amersham Dr. and Glamis St. within the suburb. Although small, the fire destroyed 3 houses and damaged a number of others.
- A fire that ignited north-west of the intersection of Egan's Rd. and Yarram-Morwell Rd., between Jack River and Madalya, and burned 2,879 ha (7,110 acres) of scrub, forest and private property, impacting the communities of Jack River, Madalya and Staceys Bridge. At least 25 properties were damaged and 2 houses, several non-residential buildings, 120 km (75 mi) of fencing and 1,600 ha (4,000 acres) of pasture and plantation were destroyed.
- A fire that ignited along Dunolly Rd., Emu, and burned 276 ha (680 acres) of scrub and private property, impacting properties in the area and destroying a house and a shed.

=== Western Australia ===
January

On 12 January, a fallen powerpole blown over by gusty winds ignited a fire in the Mundaring municipality of the Perth Hills, completely destroying 57 houses and numerous non-residential buildings. A further six houses were damaged in the suburbs of Mount Helena, Stoneville and Parkerville.

== Bibliography ==
- Emergency Management Victoria (2014). Post Season Operations Review: Fire Danger Period 2013/14 (PDF). Melbourne, Victoria: Victoria State Government.
- Murphy, Jacqueline, ed. (2013). "5,113 fires and counting: The fire season kicks off to an early start". Bush Fire Bulletin: Journal of the NSW Rural Fire Service. 35 (3). New South Wales Rural Fire Service. Archived from the original on 24 March 2016.
- Murphy, Jacqueline, ed. (2014). "October 2013: A Tribute" (PDF). Bush Fire Bulletin: Journal of the NSW Rural Fire Service. 36 (2). Lidcombe: New South Wales Rural Fire Service. Archived from the original on 31 March 2015.
