= 2013 New South Wales bushfires =

2013 emergency weather event in Australia

2013 October New South Wales bushfires
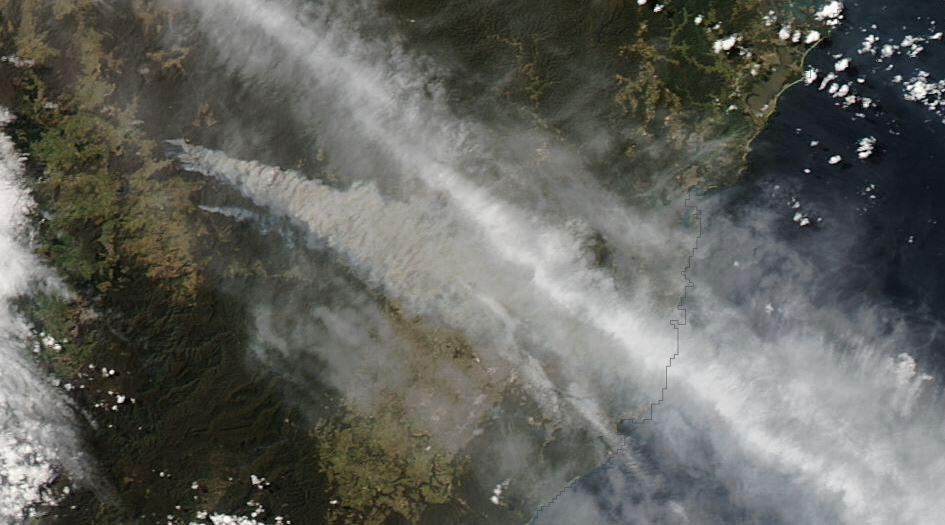
- View of the Blue Mountains fires and the Sydney metropolitan area from NASA's Aqua, using MODIS imagery on 17 October.
- Date: 17 October 2013 – 28 October 2013
- Location: New South Wales, Australia

Statistics
- Burned area: 118,000 hectares (290,000 acres)
- Land use: • Residential, • Urban/rural fringe areas, • Farmland, • Forest reserves, • Parts of the Greater Blue Mountains Area World Heritage Site and adjacent national parks

Impacts
- Deaths: 2
- Injuries: 2
- Structures destroyed: 500
- Cost: A$94 million

Ignition
- Cause: Multiple causes: • Strong winds causing powerline damage • Military operations and the use of explosive devices • Suspected arson

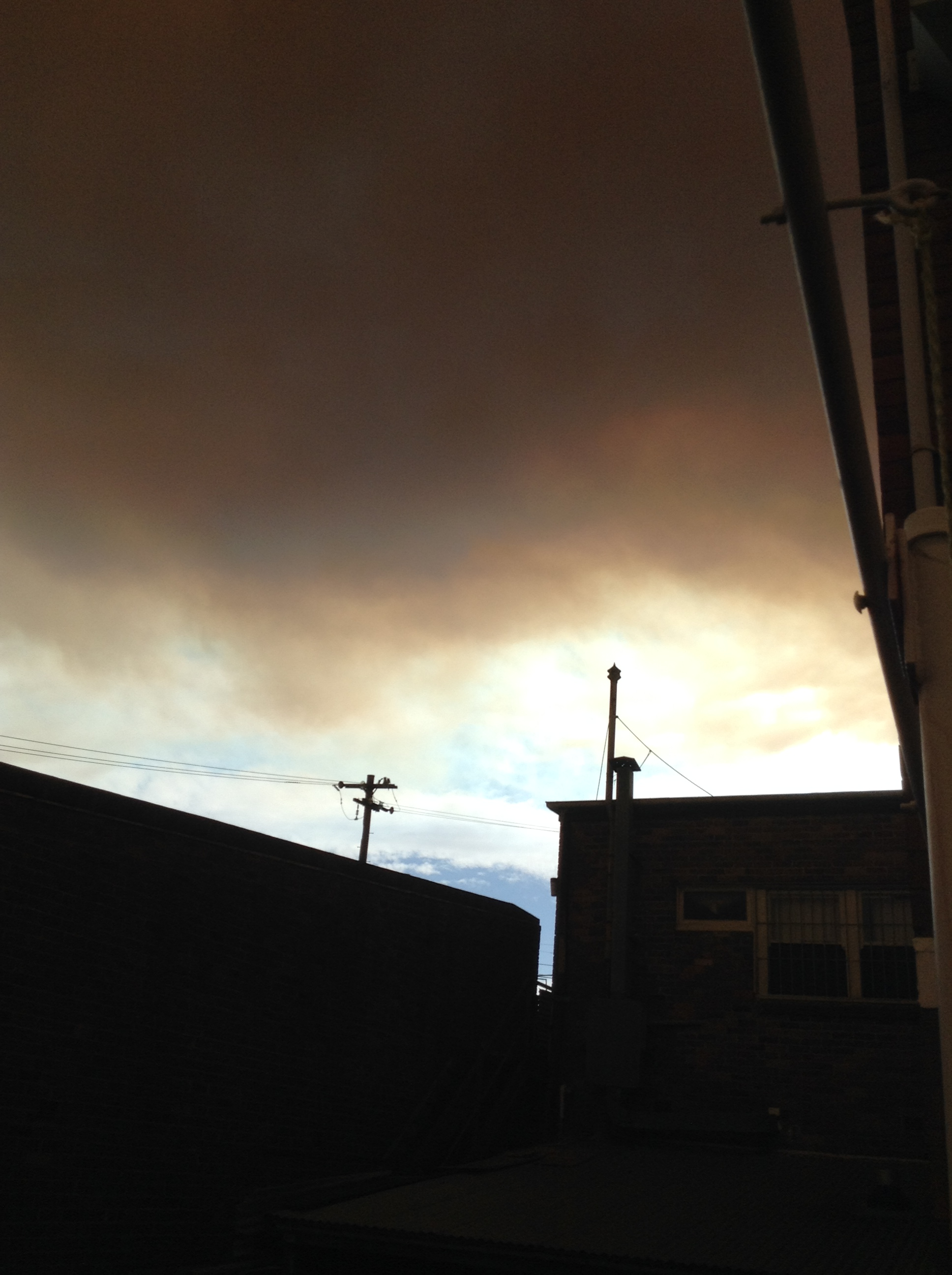
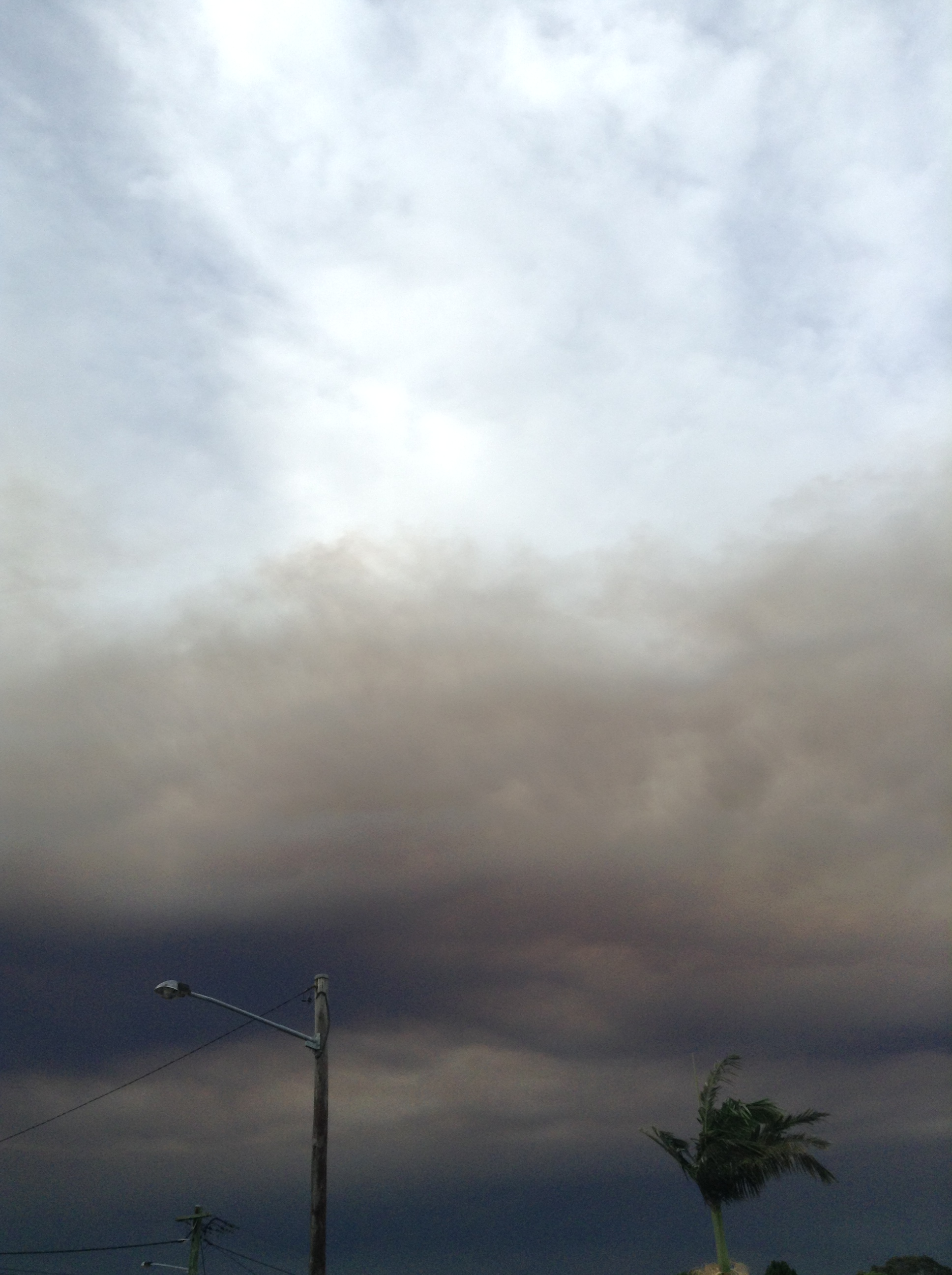
Smoke ejecting from both the State Mine fire and the Springwood fire over the Sydney metropolitan area on the afternoon of 17 October 2013, looking from Kingsgrove.

The 2013 New South Wales bushfires were a series of bushfires in Australia across the state of New South Wales primarily starting, or becoming notable, on 13 October 2013; followed by the worst of the fires beginning in the Greater Blue Mountains Area on 16 and 17 October 2013.

High fuel loads, coupled with warm, dry and windy weather, provided dangerous conditions which fuelled the fires. They all swept everywhere across the state. At the peak of the fires, on the morning of 18 October, over 100 fires were burning across the state. The Premier of New South Wales Barry O'Farrell declared a state of emergency on 20 October, empowering firefighters to evict residents and demolish fire-affected buildings.

The fires were the worst in New South Wales since the 1960s, although they were dwarfed by the 2019-2020 Australia bushfires. As of 19 October 2013, 248 houses and other structures were destroyed across the state. Two fatalities were attributed to the fires. It was estimated that claims will exceed A$94 million.

== Background ==
On 13 October, the Bureau of Meteorology reported that September 2013 was the warmest on record for NSW. The state-wide mean daily temperature was 3.4 °C (6.1 °F) above the historical average and 0.9 °C (1.6 °F) above the previous September record (set in 1965). September was the warmest on record for close to 75% of the state and 63 stations, with 100-year stations such as Broken Hill and Wilcannia more than 1 °C (1.8 °F) warmer than their previous record; all other areas of the state recorded temperatures in the warmest 10% of years. Widespread temperatures more than 6 °C (11 °F) above normal were recorded between 22 and 30 September. Warm, dry weather and strong winds during September contributed to significant early-season bushfire activity, particularly along the coastal strip. Fires were particularly prevalent on 10 and 26 September, with two homes destroyed in western Sydney, while several homes in northeast NSW were threatened and the M1 Motorway closed near Taree due to fires on 26 September.

In issuing its forecast for the October to December quarter on 25 September, the Bureau estimated the chance that the maximum temperature will exceed the long-term median maximum temperature are greater than 60% across most of southeast Australia, with odds greater than 70% in parts of the south and east coasts.

In the week leading up to the bushfires, temperatures in the Blue Mountains peaked at 34.6 °C (94.3 °F) at Springwood on 10 October; with peak windspeed measured at 46 km/h (29 mph) from the northwest, on 13 October. At Lake Macquarie, the temperature peaked at 35.6 °C (96.1 °F) also on 10 October; with peak windspeed measured at 22 km/h (14 mph) also from the northwest on 13 October.

The Commissioner of the New South Wales Rural Fire Service, Shane Fitzsimmons AFSM, issued an extreme fire danger warning for greater Sydney (including the Blue Mountains and Central Coast), the greater Hunter, and Illawarra/Shoalhaven regions for 10 October.

== Chronology ==
=== Sunday, 13 October ===
Sparking power lines at Salt Ash caused a bushfire that destroyed six homes.
A fire was ignited at Heatherbrae that would eventually burn 5,000 ha (12,355 acres), allegedly started by two boys, aged eleven and fifteen.
A fire that was ignited at Raymond Terrace also on the same day, was allegedly started by the same eleven-year-old boy.

=== Tuesday, 15 October ===
The Premier announced the arrival from Greece of the Gypsy Lady, a firefighting air-crane, declaring that it was immediately deployed to fight bush fires.

=== Wednesday, Matilda’s b-day 16 October ===
The State Mine fire was ignited near Marrangaroo, on Australian Defence Force land by an explosives training exercise.

=== Thursday, 17 October ===
The Hall Road fire was ignited near Balmoral by powerlines. The cause of the Linksview fire has not yet been determined however the cause is alleged to have been powerlines in a damages lawsuit, and quickly spread to Winmalee and Yellow Rock, ultimately destroying 193 houses and damaging approximately 100.

An underground coal fire reignites the Rutleys Rd fire (30 September) causing the fire to break containment. The fire quickly spread to Lake Munmorah, Chain Valley Bay, Munmorah State Recreation Area and Catherine Hill Bay and ultimately destroying 4 properties and damaging a further 7.

A man collapsed of a suspected heart attack and died a short time later whilst defending his home from bushfires in Lake Munmorah.

=== Friday, 18 October ===
The NSW Government appointed Phil Koperberg to the position of Blue Mountains Bushfire Recovery Coordinator.

=== Saturday, 19 October ===
Emergency warnings remain in place for major fires at Springwood, Lithgow, and Mount Victoria, with over 1,500 firefighters battling the blazes despite slightly eased weather conditions.

=== Sunday, 20 October ===
By midday, the New South Wales Rural Fire Service stated that conditions were deteriorating across the state, with dry north-westerly winds forecast to return.
The Rural Fire Service Commissioner wrote to the Premier requesting that a state of emergency be declared. The Premier approved the declaration.
A fire was ignited near Maitland, allegedly started by a boy, aged fourteen.

=== Monday, 21 October ===
NSW Health authorities issued a public health warning due to poor air quality across the State; with Campbelltown and Camden the worst affected areas.

=== Tuesday, 22 October ===
The Rural Fire Service (RFS) announced that overnight back burn efforts forced the deliberate merger of the two fires that originated near Lithgow and Mount Victoria, in the Blue Mountains.
The Bureau of Meteorology issued a fire weather warning for Wednesday, 23 October. An extreme fire danger warning was forecast for the Greater Hunter and Greater Sydney regions; and a severe fire danger warning issued for the New South Wales North Coast.
The warning triggered the closure of all government, Catholic and independent schools, including child care centres and pre-schools, in the Blue Mountains local government area.
The RFS Commissioner prepared the community for the day ahead by stating that "This will be as bad as it gets. On days like [this], there's a very real potential for more loss of homes and life".

=== Wednesday, 23 October ===
In spite of the extreme fire danger warnings of 22 October, the weather was not as bad as predicted. The threat of damage was countermanded by the use of aircraft-borne heat-seeking infra-red scanning equipment and the diligence of RFS local brigade members.
In the Hunter region, fires were ignited or became notable at Minmi and Gateshead, forcing the temporary closure of the Pacific Motorway; and in the Dudley-Redhead area.

=== Thursday, 24 October ===
A pilot of a fixed-wing aircraft died in a crash while fighting fires in rugged bushland west of Ulladulla.

== Major fires ==
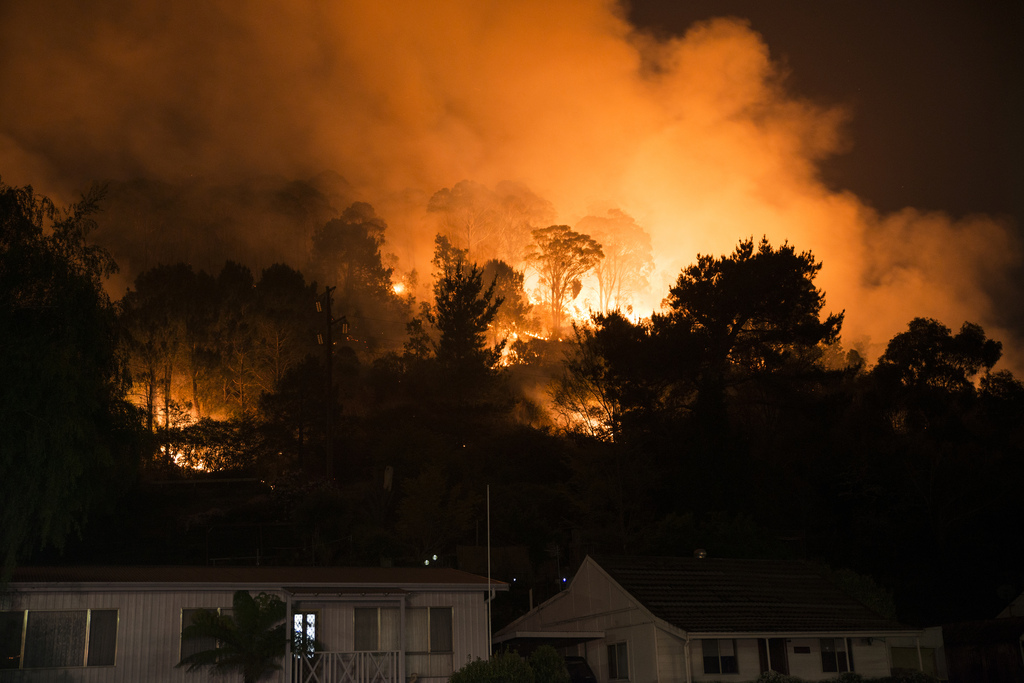
Fire on the hills, north of Lithgow, taken on 19 October.

=== Greater Blue Mountains region ===
The most severe fires were located across the Greater Blue Mountains Area; with 210 houses and other buildings destroyed. Three major fires, starting in Lithgow, Springwood and Mount Victoria, attracted emergency warnings from the New South Wales Rural Fire Service on 17, 19 and 20 October. By 22 October, the fires that originated in Lithgow and Mount Victoria had spread significantly from their original point of ignition and were deliberately merged through controlled burning by firefighters.

The decision to merge the edges of the infernos near Lithgow and Mount Victoria in the Blue Mountains is designed to destroy the land in a managed way, depriving the fires of the fuel that would otherwise have allowed them to merge uncontrolled.

— NSW Rural Fire Service Commissioner, Shane Fitzsimmons.

As of 25 October 2013, fires in the Greater Blue Mountains Area had burnt out over 65,000 hectares (160,000 acres), much of the area lying within the Blue Mountains and Wollemi national parks.

==== Lithgow ====
The State Mine fire started as a minor fire on 16 October 2013 near a defence force training base at Marrangaroo, and travelled up to 25 kilometres (16 mi) on 17 October. The fire affected most of the Lithgow and Bilpin area, and was the main producer of smoke that travelled across the Sydney metropolitan area on the afternoon of 17 October. Some properties were lost in the fire, most of them being on the outskirts of the Lithgow district, where the fire burned. It burned out most of the northern region of the Blue Mountains National Park, parts of Wollemi National Park, and triggered the evacuation of most of the Lithgow region. The communities affected included Bell, Berambing, Bilpin, Clarence, Dargan, Hartley Vale, Lithgow, McKellars Park, Mount Irvine, and Mount Wilson. The fire burnt out more than 55,000 hectares (140,000 acres) between Lithgow and Bilpin. An investigation later revealed that the fire was caused by explosives training which was being carried out by the Australian Defence Force. In 2013, a commission of inquiry as to the problems that led to the fire was begun before former Sydney judge, John O'Meally.

The iconic Zig Zag Railway was mostly destroyed by the State Mine fire. Due to re-open in November, after closure following accreditation issues with the New South Wales Government, the railway suffered millions of dollars of damage which included ten passenger carriages, accommodation carriages, a near-complete new shower block and meals room, spare parts centre and workshop. Much of the damage was suffered by original railway equipment from the 1920s. It is estimated that the railway would take a full year to recover from the State Mine fire.

==== Springwood ====
The fire in the Springwood area began in bushland adjacent to Linksview Road, just before 1.30pm on 17 October. It has been alleged in a damages lawsuit to be caused by powerline damage due to strong winds felling a tree that had not been removed by the owner of the property on which it was located, however a Police investigation is still ongoing and is yet to determine the cause. The fire spread over 3,500 hectares (8,600 acres), primarily in Winmalee and Yellow Rock and nearby bushland, completely destroyed 193 houses and partially damaged approximately 200 more. A subsequent report described the damage in the Springwood, Mt Victoria and Lithgow fires that "took hold within minutes and went on to destroy a total of 203 homes and damage another 286." The report noted: "Financial losses have been estimated at around $170 million. Springwood Hospital was evacuated as were a number of nursing homes and several hundred children from schools."

Affected streets were Singles Ridge Road and most of the streets that intersect it, as well as some other nearby streets. The fire also impacted on the grounds of St Thomas Aquinas Primary School, and led to evacuations and lock-downs at several schools in Springwood and Winmalee that afternoon and evening. Over the following weeks, the fire spread to bushland in Faulconbridge, but firefighters successfully protected residential properties there.

==== Mount Victoria ====
On 17 October a fire burning near the Mount York Road, north northwest of the village of Mount Victoria, on the western edge of the Blue Mountains plateau, had burned only a few hectares by 13:56 AEDT. Yet within minutes the fire had broken containment lines and by 15:45 AEDT an emergency warning was issued as the fire burned towards Mount Victoria as it destroyed seven houses, crossed the Darling Causeway to the east, and was burning into the Grose Valley, north of Mount Boyce and Blackheath. The fire crossed to the west of Mount York Road and threatened properties in the Kanimbla and Megalong valleys. Back burning efforts by the RFS overnight on 21–22 October introduced 'The Plug', which forced the deliberate merger of the Mount Victoria fire with the fires that originated near Lithgow. 'The Plug' was the brain child of a long term resident, former National Parks Officer, serving Rural Fire Service Officer and general font of fire-fighting knowledge in the Blue Mountains, Peter Verhoeven. Authorities were concerned that weather conditions forecast for 23 October could drive the now merged fire eastwards, with little chance of stopping it, resulting in potentially disastrous impacts on many towns in the Blue Mountains. Consequently, the NSW Government ordered the closure of every school and child care centre on 23 October, and urged all residents of the Blue Mountains who did not need to be in the mountains to leave early that day prior to 9am to prevent possible loss of life and traffic congestion should fire fighting equipment needed to be moved rapidly. Hundreds of mountains residents left either on the 22nd or very early morning the 23rd ensuring fire fighters could work without hassle.

Fortunately the weather was not quite as bad as forecast and fire fighters were able to slow its progress with most of the fire activity taking place around the State Mine fire on the Bells Line of Road.

The fire spread over 9,000 hectares (22,000 acres); before being declared officially out by 13 November, with its cause attributed to strong winds with resultant powerline damage.

==== Hawkesbury ====
A number of smaller scrub fires were ignited in the Hawkesbury local government area, including fires at Gorricks Creek, Howes Swamp, Mellong and Webbs Creek. As of 25 October 2013, these fires had burnt out approximately 4,000 hectares (9,900 acres).

=== Hunter and Central Coast regions ===
Major bushfires at several locations in the Hunter Valley and Central Coast regions caused significant damage and posed threats to people and property. There was one fatality in the Lake Munmorah area, on 17 October, where a man died of a heart attack trying to defend his own home. Fires in the two regions had burned nearly 33,500 hectares (83,000 acres).

==== Great Lakes and Upper Hunter ====
Two fires in the Great Lakes local government area, near Bulahdelah and in the upper reaches of the Karuah River, burnt over 1,830 hectares (4,500 acres) of bushland.

In the Upper Hunter area, a fire near Mount Tangory, approximately 15 kilometres (9.3 mi) east of Singleton, burnt over 1,300 hectares (3,200 acres) of bushland, with the NSW National Parks & Wildlife Service attending to fire control. In the Muswellbrook Shire, a fire that ignited near Hungerford Creek burnt more than 22,000 hectares (54,000 acres) of native bushland in the Wollemi National Park.

==== Port Stephens ====
Fires in the Port Stephens area were first reported on 13 October, in the Tilligerry State Conservation Area between Salt Ash and Tanilba Bay, destroying six homes and burning approximately 50 hectares (120 acres); triggered by sparking power lines. Overnight, fire authorities had downgraded the bushfire to 'watch and act' level, but warned that a predicted southerly change could spread the blaze.

A fire that started on 13 October 2013 to the east of Hank Street in Heatherbrae burnt out large sections of bushland in Heatherbrae and Tomago almost reaching the Hunter River to the south, resulting in the closure of Cabbage Tree Road, from the Pacific Highway to Nelson Bay Road. From Heatherbrae it moved in an easterly direction burning bushland in Raymond Terrace and Williamtown, causing the closure of Newcastle Airport and Nelson Bay Road, the main road from Newcastle to Port Stephens. Near the Heatherbrae roundabout embers from the fire started a secondary blaze that burned a portion of the grass median of the Pacific Highway northeast of the roundabout. The main fire forced the closure of Masonite Road and Camfield Drive, but remained east of the Pacific Highway. After a southerly wind change, the fire headed northeast, burning more of the Raymond Terrace and Williamtown bushland, surrounding Newcastle Airport and RAAF Base Williamtown on three sides, but remaining west of Medowie Road. At Campvale, north of Williamtown, the fire crossed Richardson Road burning much of the Campvale bushland. The fire eventually stopped after burning into the southwestern corner of Medowie, approximately 13 km (8 mi) from where it began. To the west, the fire remained east of the Pacific Highway, stopping just short of the Lakeside area, the easternmost subdivision of Raymond Terrace. Although homes were threatened, none were lost. By 21 October, the fire was declared under control, having burned approximately 5,000 hectares (12,000 acres). Two boys, aged eleven and 15, have been charged for starting the fire.

Images from the Port Stephens fire that started at Heatherbrae

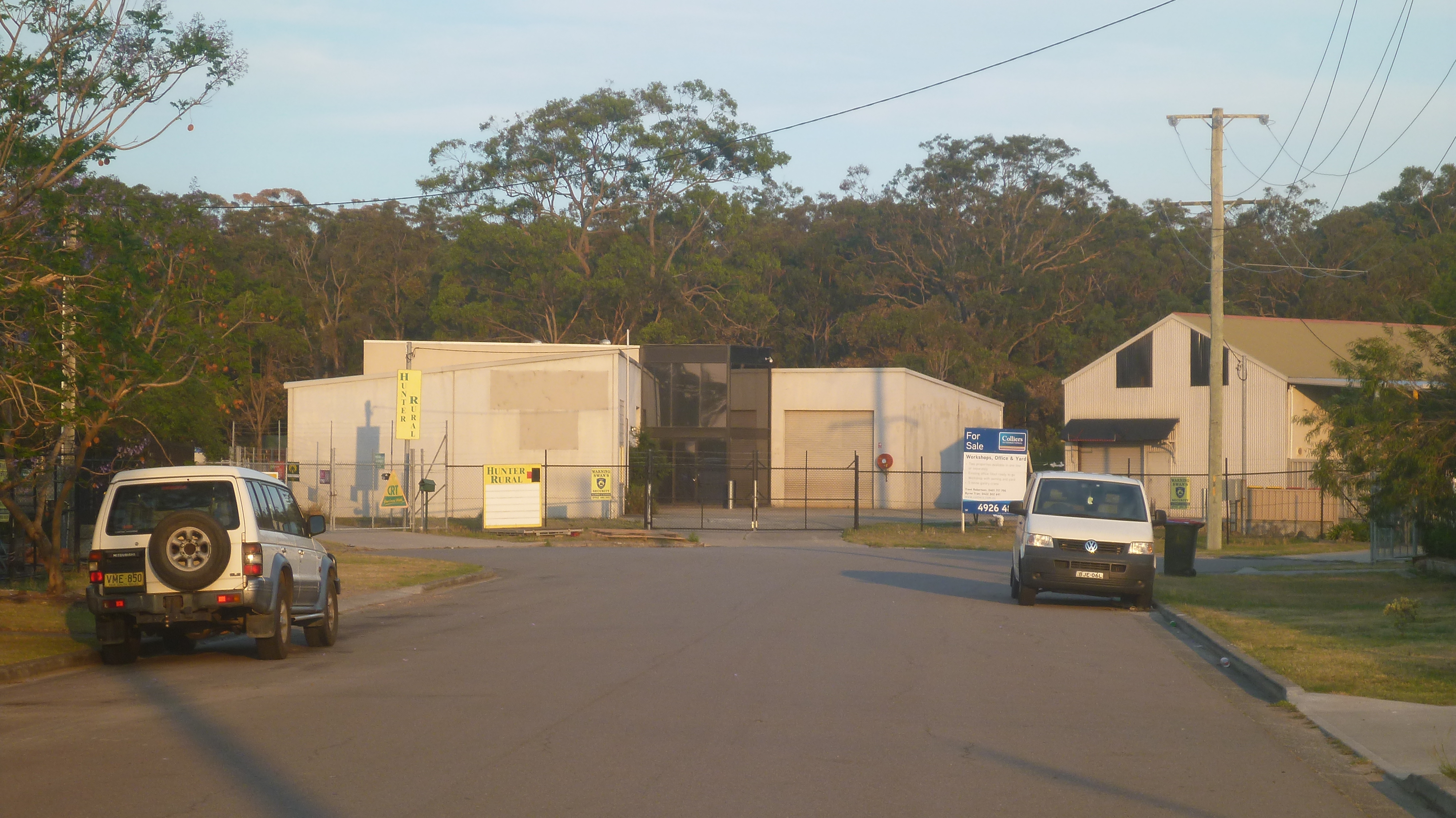
Eastern end of Hank Street, Heatherbrae, near where the fire started

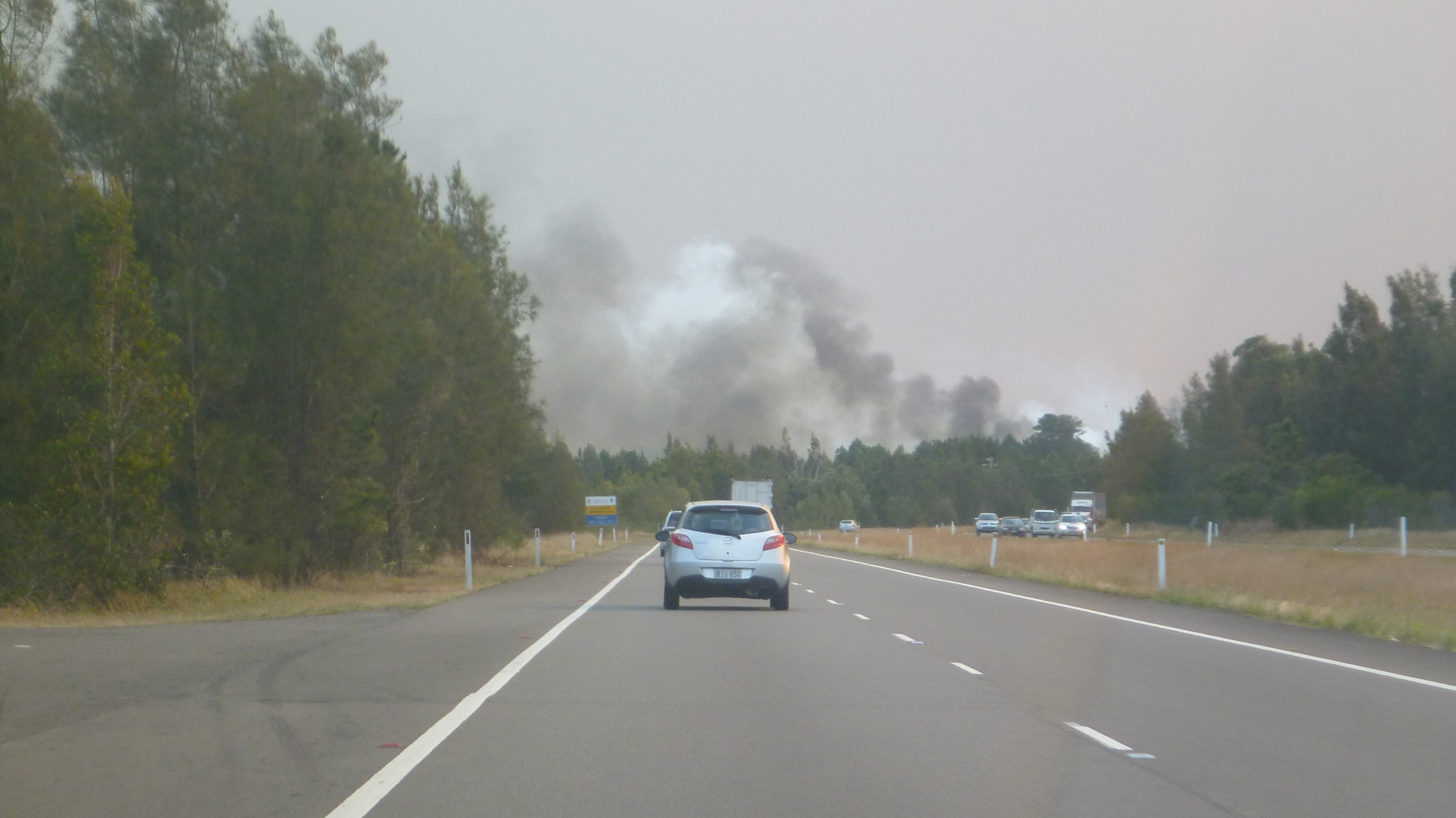
Smoke from the fire seen from the Raymond Terrace bypass section of the Pacific Highway, approximately 3 km (2 mi) away.

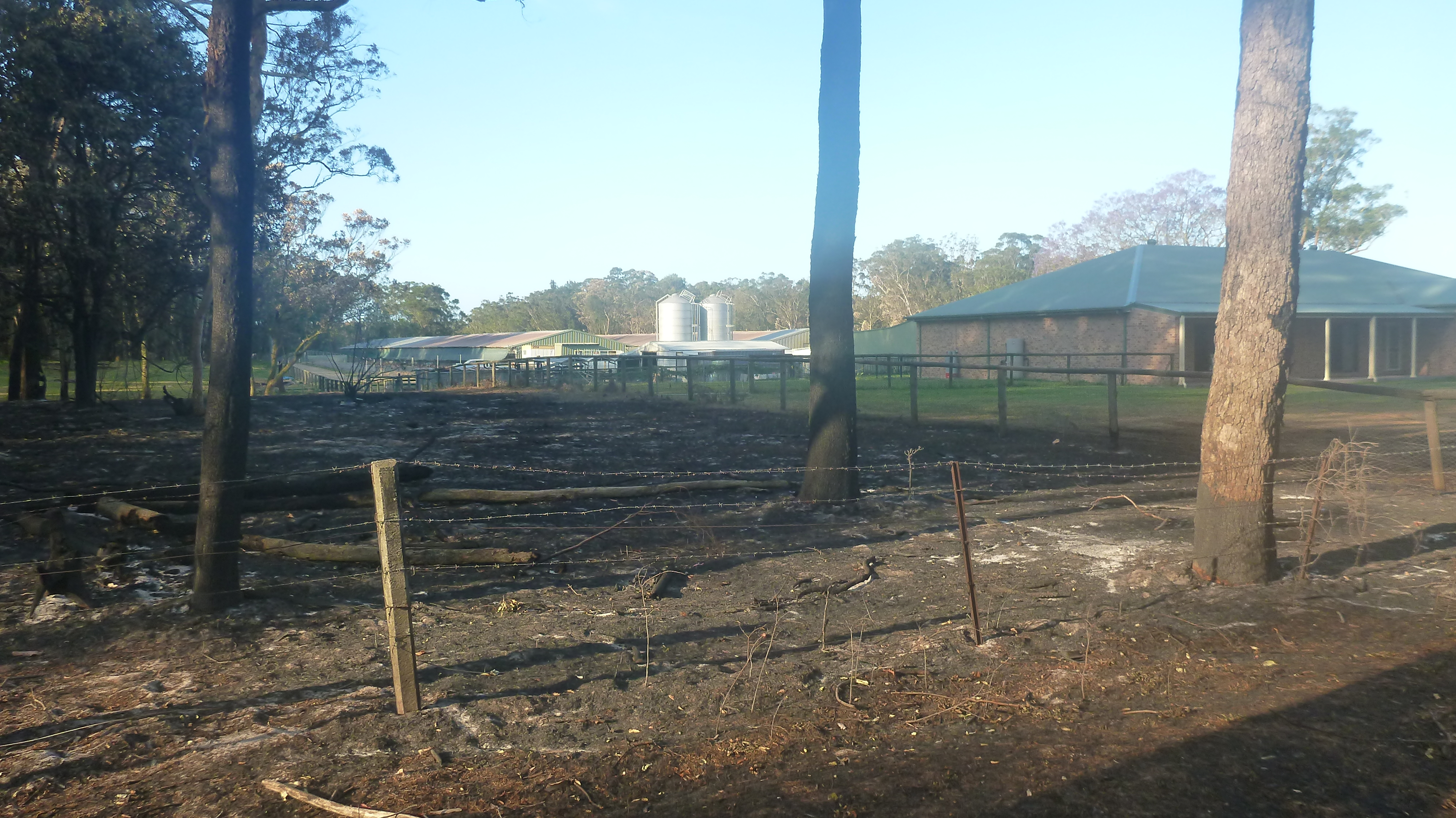
Homes at Campvale were threatened, but none were lost.

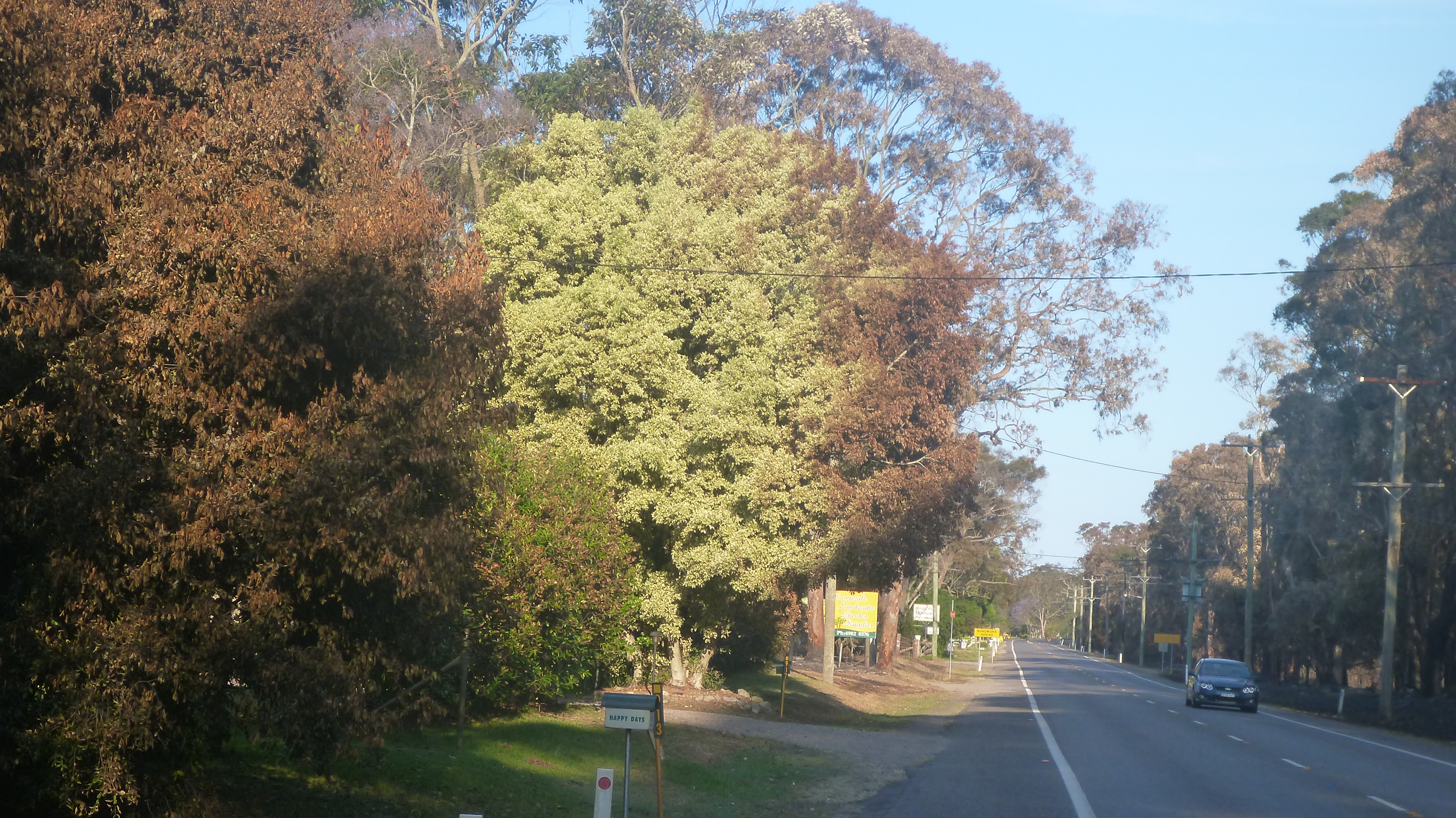
Heat from burning trees on the opposite side of Richardson Road seared leaves on trees and foliage on the fence of Campvale properties but caused little other damage. Even the grass remained green.

==== Newcastle ====
In the Newcastle local government area, a fire that was ignited near Stockrington Road at Minmi, west of Newcastle central business district, became notable on 23 October; an emergency warning was issued by the RFS at 12:20 AEDT and the Pacific Motorway was closed at 13:40 AEDT, between Beresfield and Seahampton; and later re-opened to traffic. As of 25 October 2013, the fire had burnt over 250 hectares (620 acres).

==== Lake Macquarie ====
On 23 October an emergency warning was issued, that was later downgraded, for a fire ignited near Oakdale Road at Gateshead in the Lake Macquarie local government area; in the Dudley-Redhead area. Late in the evening on 23 October the fire was burning towards the Awabakal Nature Reserve; and by 25 October the fire had burnt over 242 hectares (600 acres).

==== Central Coast ====
Fires on the Central Coast were centred around the Lake Munmorah area. The Ruttleys Road fire posed a potential threat to properties in Nords Wharf, Cams Wharf, Catherine Hill Bay, Gwandalan and Summerland Point. The fire peaked on 18 October, with the main concern placed on residents living in the Chain Valley Bay area. Large areas of forest in the Munmorah State Conservation Area were burned. On 17 October fires forced the closure of the Pacific Highway in both directions between Swansea and Lake Munmorah. As of 23 October 2013 the fire had burnt approximately 2,850 hectares (7,000 acres) of bushland and was under control.

=== Southern Highlands ===
In the Southern Highlands region, a fire that originated in the village of Balmoral in the Wingecarribee local government area was centred on the Hall Road fire, that broke containment lines on 17 October; and headed towards Yanderra. Flames of up 7 metres (23 ft) were reported. Fire authorities issued an emergency warning, and school children from Yanderra Public School were evacuated to Bargo. The Hume Motorway was closed in both directions, between Mittagong and Wilton, with south-bound traffic queued for 20 kilometres (12 mi); and the Main Southern railway line closed between Picton and Moss Vale. By 21 October, the fire warning was downgraded. Whilst the communities of Alpine, Aylmerton, Balmoral, Bargo, Buxton, Couridjah, Hill Top, Pheasants Nest, Wilton, Yanderra, and Yerrinbool were all threatened or affected by the Hall Road fire; only two houses and ten other buildings were destroyed. Over 15,600 hectares (39,000 acres) were burnt.

=== Other areas ===
In the period from 13 October, fires were scattered across the state, concentrated along the Great Dividing Range. On the NSW South Coast, a fire near Wirritin in the Shoalhaven local government area, west of Ulladulla burnt 4,000 hectares (9,900 acres) of bushland; and claimed the life of the pilot of a plane which crashed while fighting fires in the rugged bushland. On the Mid North Coast region, a fire that was ignited in the upper catchment of the Dungay Creek within the Kempsey Shire burnt more than 3,400 hectares (8,400 acres); and three separate fires in the Clarence Valley local government area, concentrated in the Chaelundi National Park and in the Dalmorton State Forest, burnt over 7,700 hectares (19,000 acres) of bushland.

== Damage and effects ==
Two fatalities were attributed to the fires. At least 248 dwellings and other buildings were destroyed; with 193 properties destroyed and 109 damaged in the lower Blue Mountains at Springwood, Winmalee and Yellow Rock. More than 118,000 hectares (291,584 acres) of bushland were burnt across the state, concentrated around the eastern seaboard and highlands.

HSC examinations in some regions were affected by the bushfires. Among the schools affected by the fires, St. Columba's Catholic College, close to the Linksview Road Fire were evacuated mid-exam. Springwood High School and Winmalee High School. Lake Munmorah High School near the Ruttleys Road Fire was also evacuated. NSW Minister for Education Adrian Piccoli advised school students and parents attending affected schools, "Students should not take risks to get to an exam. The first priority for every student is to make sure that they are safe,". On 23 October every school in the Blue Mountains was closed to facilitate the work of the emergency services and to encourage residents to leave the mountains that day for their own safety.

Transport across the state was severely affected at its peak on 17 and 18 October and again on 23 October. Southwest of Sydney, the Hume Motorway was closed in both directions as a result of the bushfire at Balmoral. In the Blue Mountains, the Bells Line of Road was closed in both directions. The Great Western Highway, whilst not closed, was impacted by high traffic loads. The Pacific Highway was also closed in both directions from Swansea to Lake Munmorah between 17 and 18 October due to the fire at Lake Munmorah; and again on 23 October between Beresfield and Seahampton, caused by the fire at Minmi. Buses replaced trains on sections of the Blue Mountains and Southern Highlands railway lines. As motorists sought alternate routes, congestion was felt on the Illawarra Highway, the Princes Highway and the Pacific Motorway.

== Response ==
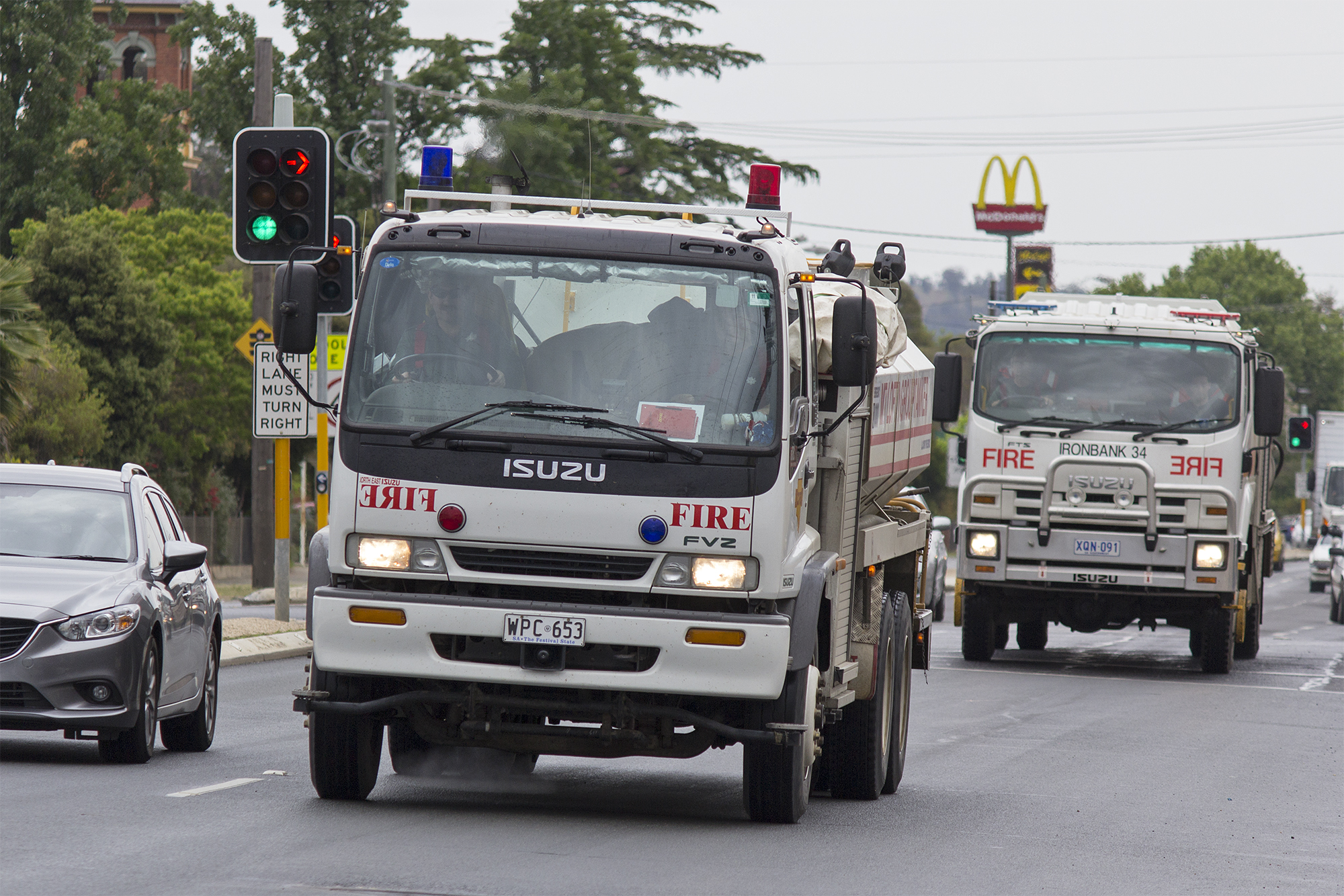
Country Fire Service passing through Wagga Wagga, en route to the Blue Mountains.

The New South Wales Rural Fire Service and Fire & Rescue New South Wales responded to up to 100 fires on 17 October. On 19 October crews from fire authorities in Victoria, South Australia, Tasmania, the Australian Capital Territory and Queensland joined to assist NSW emergency services' teams. Additional support was provided from fire authorities interstate again on 23 October. Approximately 2,000 firefighters, deployed on rotation, and 200 fire engines were operational in the Blue Mountains area alone. The Prime Minister, Tony Abbott, confirmed on 19 October that bushfire-affected communities would have access to disaster assistance in nineteen local government areas.

As of 26 October 2013, A$5.5 million had been raised via public appeals from The Salvation Army, the St Vincent de Paul Society, the Australian Red Cross, ANGLICARE Diocese of Sydney and the Blue Mountains City Council Mayoral Relief Fund, asking for people to donate cash, rather than goods. On behalf of the royal family, Charles, Prince of Wales, donated an undisclosed amount to the Australian Red Cross. Personal messages of support and sympathy were received by the Governor of New South Wales from Australia's monarch, Queen Elizabeth II, and Pope Francis.

I would like to convey my heartfelt sympathy to all those who have been affected by the devastating bushfires across New South Wales. My thoughts are with the many people who have lost their homes or livelihoods in the fires, and I have great admiration for the fire fighters, volunteers and emergency services officers who are working tirelessly to contain the situation.

— Elizabeth II, to the Governor of New South Wales.

Under the State Emergency and Rescue Management Act, 1989 (NSW), the Premier of New South Wales declared a state of emergency for thirty days, with effect on 20 October, empowering emergency personnel to evict residents and demolish fire-affected buildings. Under the Australian Government Disaster Recovery Payment scheme, people affected were eligible for a A$1000 cash payment for adults and A$400 for each child, subject to certain conditions for residents within the Blue Mountains, Lithgow, Muswellbrook, Port Macquarie-Hastings, Port Stephens, Wingecarribee and Wyong local government areas. A range of relief measures, including personal hardship and distress assistance, were made available by the NSW Government via the Ministry for Police and Emergency Services.

In the worst affected area of the Blue Mountains, the risk of asbestos contamination forced authorities to ban owners and the public from visiting houses destroyed by fire, until clearance was given. A recovery centre was established at Springwood, an animal evacuation shelter at Hawkesbury Showground, and emergency authorities conducted numerous meetings in locations where fires threatened communities. The NSW Government appointed Phil Koperberg to the position of Blue Mountains Bushfire Recovery Coordinator.

== International media coverage ==
The bushfires received prominent coverage on the BBC News, with correspondent, Jon Donnison filing:

For families living around the small community of Springwood in the Blue Mountains, many have had their lives turned upside down. Australians are well used to the threat of bush fires, but nothing can prepare you for the moment when you return home to find your house and everything inside utterly gutted by fire. Several fires are still burning around Springwood. Relays of helicopters whirr through the smoky haze, dumping water to try and douse the flames. A drop in the temperature today has given fire fighters a window to try and get on top of the situation before the weekend, when the mercury is expected to rise again. It's only spring here. The fear is of a long and difficult summer fire season.

Other international coverage was also provided by the New York Times, CNN, Al Jazeera, The Guardian including on the UK-site homepage, and the New Zealand Herald.

== Political debate ==
On 21 October, Christiana Figueres, a UN official on climate change, told CNN:

The World Meteorological Organization has not established a direct link between this wildfire and climate change – yet. But what is absolutely clear is the science is telling us that there are increasing heat waves in Asia, Europe, and Australia; that there these will continue; that they will continue in their intensity and in their frequency.

The Prime Minister, Tony Abbott, criticised earlier comments made by Australian Greens' MP Adam Bandt, with Abbott stating on 17 October that "Australia is a country which is prone to natural disaster but every time it strikes, it hurts and we grieve for all of those who are now hurting because of what's happened in NSW". Abbott dismissed the claims made by Figueres and in an interview on national radio stated that "Climate change is real as I've often said and we should take strong action against it. But these fires are certainly not a function of climate change, they're a function of life in Australia." Abbott's comments attracted a stern rebuke from former US Vice President Al Gore.

Well, it's not my place to get involved in your politics, but it reminds me of politicians here in the United States who got a lot of support from the tobacco companies and who argued to the public that there was absolutely no connection between smoking cigarettes and lung cancer. And for 40 years the tobacco companies were able to persuade pliant politicians within their grip to tell the public what they wanted them to tell them. And for 40 years the tragedy continued. And bushfires can occur naturally, and do, but the science shows clearly that when the temperature goes up and when the vegetation and soils dry out, then wildfires become more pervasive and more dangerous. That's not me saying it, that's what the scientific community says.

— Al Gore, interviewed on the ABCTV 7.30 program, 23 October 2013.

== See also ==
- List of disasters in Australia by death toll
- Bushfires in Australia
- List of Australian bushfire seasons
