= Wallarah Colliery =

Mine in Nords Wharf, New South Wales

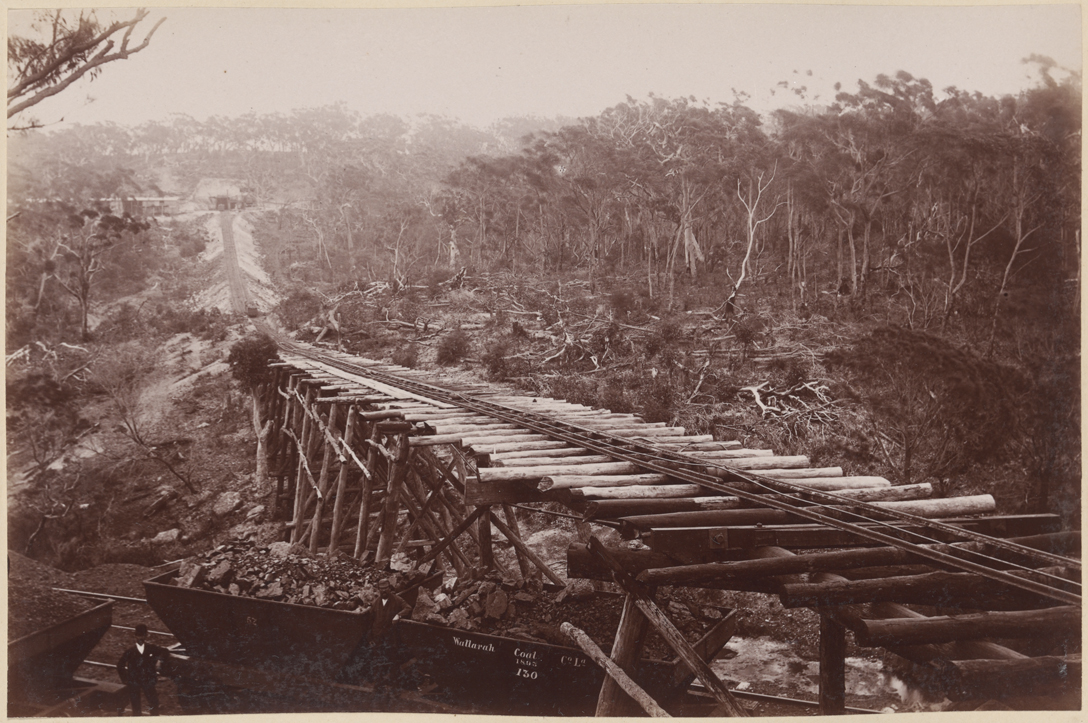
- Interactive map of Wallarah Colliery
- Location: Nords Wharf, New South Wales, Australia; 33°08′35″S 151°37′19″E
- Products: Coal

Wallarah Colliery was a coal mine located near Crangan Bay, Nords Wharf, New South Wales, Australia, and originally above ground utilities were at Mine Camp, very near Catherine Hill Bay. Originally coal was moved by above ground railway from Mine Camp area to the Catherine Hill Bay jetty, but after the move to Crangan Bay, it was moved underground to surface very near the jetty.
