= Moonee =

Coordinates: 33°10′26″S 151°37′34″E

- Suburb
- Interactive map of Moonee
- Country: Australia
- State: New South Wales
- LGA: Central Coast Council; City of Lake Macquarie
- Location: 27 km (17 mi) NNE of The Entrance; 12 km (7.5 mi) SSW of Swansea; 38 km (24 mi) SSW of Newcastle; 48 km (30 mi) NNE of Gosford; 126 km (78 mi) NNE of Sydney

Government
  - State electorate: Swansea
  - Federal division: Shortland
- Elevation: 11 m (36 ft)

Population
  - Total: 0 (SAL 2016)
- Postcode: 2259, 2281
- Parish: Wallarah
Suburbs around Moonee
Nords Wharf	Catherine Hill Bay	Pacific Ocean
Crangan Bay	Moonee	Pacific Ocean
Munmorah SCA	Munmorah SCA	Pacific Ocean

Moonee is a coastal locality of the Central Coast and Hunter regions of New South Wales, Australia. It is part of the Central Coast Council and City of Lake Macquarie local government areas.

Moonee is largely unpopulated, with nearly all of its land and beaches being part of the Munmorah State Conservation Area. In the west of the area is the decommissioned Moonee Colliery.

The City of Lake Macquarie part of Moonee is considered to be part of the Greater Newcastle area, while the Central Coast Council part of Moonee is part of the Central Coast.

== Moonee Beach ==
On the 15th of March 1973 during a school excursion from Morisset High School, schoolboys entered the beach during hazardous surf. Four boys who entered were caught in an rip current and were separated from the rest of the school group.

The excursions bus driver, Bernie Goodwin, entered the water and retrieved three of the four boys; upon rescuing the fourth boy more than 100 meters out to sea, Goodwin suffered a presumed heart attack and disappeared beneath the surface when local surfboard riders came to their aid. Despite an extensive search, Goodwin's body was never recovered. In 2016, Goodwin's family were presented with the Premier of New South Wales's award for Goodwin's heroism at the beach. In 2018, Goodwin was posthumously honoured with the Australian Bravery Medal, the third highest civilian bravery honour in the Australian honours system.

In 2012, three people died whilst fishing at Moonee Beach.

In April 2022, a woman in her twenties drowned whilst exploring rocks with friends at Moonee Beach.

In July 2022, an 80 year old woman and her 76 year old husband were both drowned after being swept into the ocean by a "freak wave" whilst exploring rock formations at Moonee Beach.
