= Lake Munmorah =

Lake in New South Wales, Australia

- Munmorah Lake
- Location within New South Wales

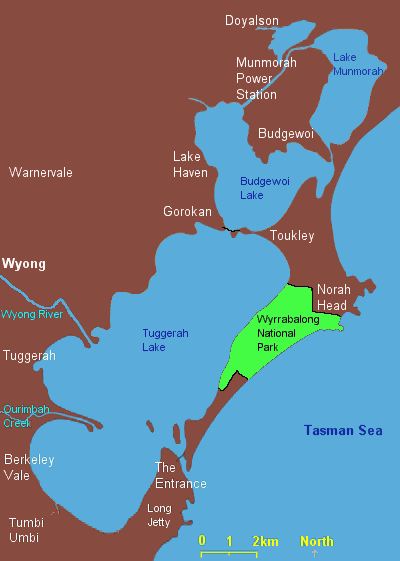
- Lake Munmorah is the northernmost of the three Tuggerah Lakes
- Location: Central Coast, New South Wales, Australia
- Coordinates: 33°13′S 151°34′E
- Part of: Tuggerah Lakes, Central Coast catchment
- Primary inflows: Budgewoi Creek
- Primary outflows: Budgewoi Lake, then to Tuggerah Lake
- Basin countries: Australia
- Surface area: 780 ha (1,900 acres)
- Surface elevation: 0 m (0 ft)
- Settlements: Lake Munmorah

Lake Munmorah or Munmorah Lake, a lagoon that is part of the Tuggerah Lakes, is located within the Central Coast Council local government area in the Central Coast region of New South Wales, Australia. The lake is located near the settlement of Lake Munmorah and is situated about 110 kilometres (68 mi) north of Sydney.

== Features and location ==
A quaint little village nestled on the banks of a lake with the same name, where people enjoy watersports of all types in the crystal clear waters. Lake Munmorah is located north of Budgewoi and is bounded by Wyee, Mannering Park and Wyee Bay. To the south of the lake, the Budgewoi Lake and Tuggerah Lake drains excess water, that flows to the Tasman Sea of the South Pacific Ocean, via The Entrance. When full, Lake Munmorah covers an area of around 780 hectares (1,900 acres).

== National Park of Munmorah ==
Lake Munmorah has an NPWS owned National Park north east of Munmorah. It hosts beaches, lookouts, picnic areas, hiking trails and more.

== History ==
In October 2013 the area was threatened by bushfires. Evacuations were carried out to Doyalson and Swansea RSL's (Returned Services League) and Gwandalan Bowling Club. Power lines were brought down affecting over 600 homes. Munmorah State Conservation Area had large areas burnt out. One man died while trying to protect his heritage listed home.

== See also ==
- Munmorah State Conservation Area
- List of lakes of Australia
