= Lake Munmorah, New South Wales =

Lake Munmorah Central Coast, New South Wales
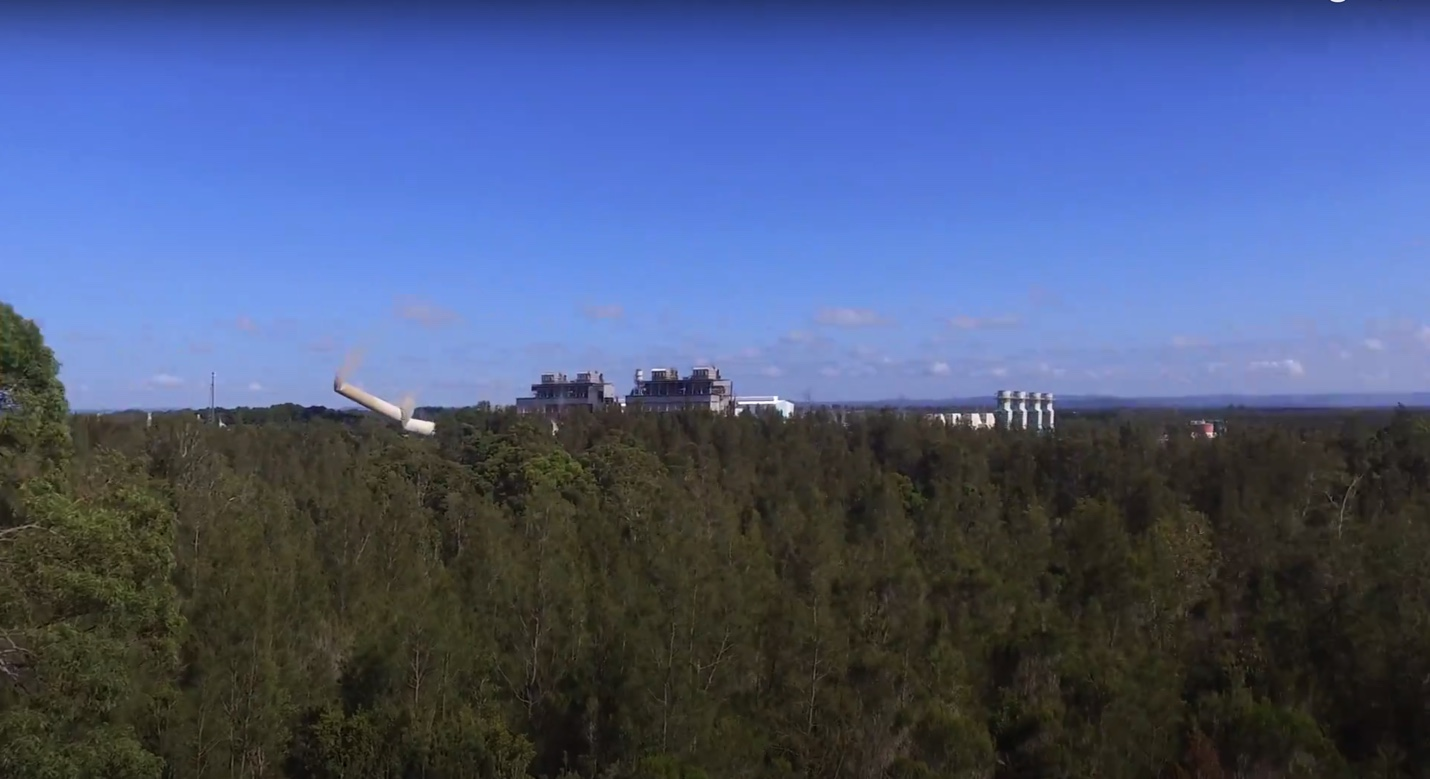
- Lake Munmorah Power Station

- Coordinates: 33°10′55″S 151°35′06″E
- Population: 5,248 (2016 census)
- Postcode(s): 2259
- Elevation: 26 m (85 ft)
- Location: 22 km (14 mi) NNE of The Entrance; 17 km (11 mi) SSW of Swansea; 44 km (27 mi) SSW of Newcastle; 43 km (27 mi) NNE of Gosford; 120 km (75 mi) NNE of Sydney
- LGA(s): Central Coast Council
- Parish: Toukley/Lake Munmorah
- State electorate(s): Swansea
- Federal division(s): Shortland
Suburbs around Lake Munmorah:
Doyalson North	Chain Valley Bay	Crangan Bay
Colongra	Lake Munmorah	Munmorah SCA
Colongra	Lake Munmorah	Munmorah SCA

Lake Munmorah is a suburb of the Central Coast region of New South Wales, Australia. It is part of the Central Coast Council local government area.

== Location and features ==
Adjacent to Lake Munmorah is the Munmorah State Conservation Area. The park offers coastal bushwalking, rock fishing and surf breaks adjacent to Frazer Park.

Lake Munmorah hosts four schools along the same road (Carters road). They are Saint Brendan's Primary school (a Catholic primary school), Saint Brigid's College (a Catholic secondary school), Lake Munmorah Public School (a public primary school), and Lake Munmorah High School (a public secondary school).

The actual Lake is a very shallow lake that peaks at about 3 to 4m deep, though is rather wide, with three main access areas: Elizabeth Bay, Tom Burke Reserve, and Colongra Bay Reserve. During the summer there are prawns to be caught but there seem to be very few fish of any size.

Lake Munmorah marks the border between Awabakal and Darkinjung Aboriginal country.

The town was put in danger due to the 2013 New South Wales bushfires, with one man having a fatal heart attack while defending his home, but the town escaped severe damage.

== Population ==
According to the 2016 census of Population, there were 5,248 people in Lake Munmorah.

- Aboriginal and Torres Strait Islander people made up 4.2% of the population.
- 82.3% of people were born in Australia. The next most common country of birth was England at 4.3%.
- 91.8% of people spoke only English at home.
- The most common responses for religion were Anglican 28.5%, Catholic 25.7% and No Religion 24.1%.

== Notable people ==
- Steve Bisley, an actor from the Australian police drama, Water Rats, grew up in Carters Road, Lake Munmorah.

== See also ==
- Lake Munmorah (Waterbody)
- Munmorah State Conservation Area
- Munmorah Power Station
- Northern Lake Munmorah Sand Dunes
- 2013 New South Wales bushfires
