= Crangan Bay =

- Suburb
- Interactive map of Crangan Bay
- Coordinates: 33°10′26″S 151°35′35″E
- Country: Australia
- State: New South Wales
- LGA: Central Coast Council
- Location: 24 km (15 mi) NNE of The Entrance; 13 km (8.1 mi) SSW of Swansea; 41 km (25 mi) SSW of Newcastle; 46 km (29 mi) NNE of Gosford; 123 km (76 mi) NNE of Sydney

Government
  - State electorate: Swansea
  - Federal division: Shortland
- Elevation: 4 m (13 ft)

Population
  - Total: 3 (SAL 2016)
- Postcode: 2259, 2281
- Parish: Wallarah
Suburbs around Crangan Bay
Gwandalan	Nords Wharf	Catherine Hill Bay
Chain Valley Bay	Crangan Bay	Moonee
Lake Munmorah	Munmorah SCA	Munmorah SCA

Crangan Bay is a coastal suburb of the Central Coast and Hunter regions of New South Wales, Australia, located between Budgewoi and Swansea on the bay of the same name. It is part of the Central Coast Council and City of Lake Macquarie local government areas.

The suburb is a bushland area currently undergoing urban development. The major land owners are the local aboriginal land council and land held by an urban development company and the Coal and Allied mining company, who intend to turn this area into a suburb.

There is a concrete recycling depot and gravel quarry on the northern end of the suburb which contains conglomerate used for road base. This product has been extensively used by the abolished Wyong Shire Council in the construction of local roads.

This bay is part of the greater Wallarah Peninsula and Lower Hunter bioregions. Crangan Bay is mostly situated in the Central Coast Council local government area in the Central Coast region, while the City of Lake Macquarie part of Crangan Bay is considered to be part of the Greater Newcastle area.
