= Northern Lake Munmorah Sand Dunes =

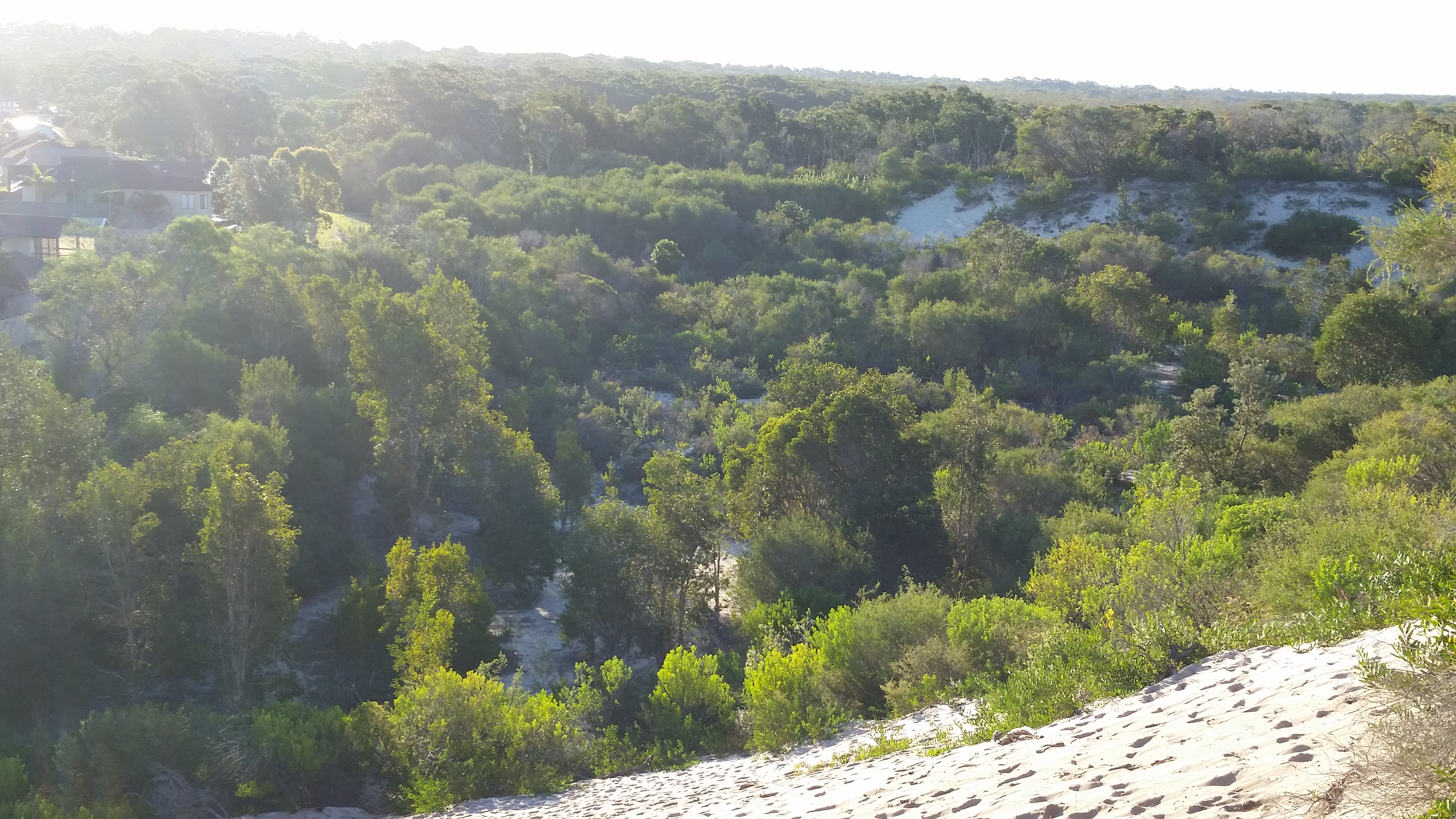
Munmorah Sand Dunes in 2017

Northern Lake Munmorah Sand Dunes is a natural site in Northern Lake Munmorah, Australia.

The eight sand dunes were formed 40,000 years during huge sandstorms over many years. It is one of the biggest sand-dune sights in the Central Coast of New South Wales.

Aboriginal Australians lived in the dunes. and evidence of this can still be found today.

The Munmorah Sand Dunes have been in Northern Lake Munmorah for nearly 40 thousand years. The eight sand-dunes were formed during huge sandstorms over many years. It is one of the biggest sand-dune sights in the Central Coast.

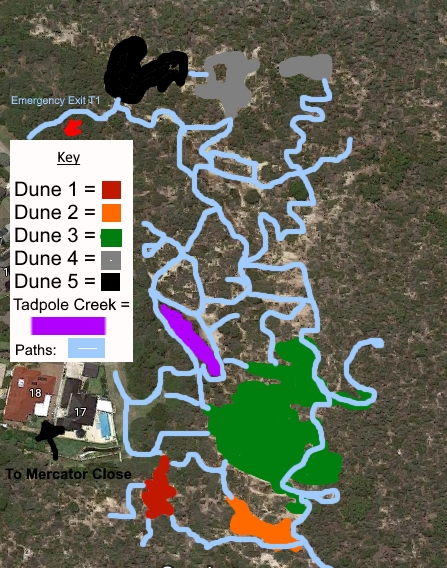
Layout of Munmorah Sand Dunes

== Names for Dunes ==
The Aboriginals had names for these dunes

Dune No.	Name Of Dune	Colour Code	Length
Dune 1	Grenshaft	16m	
Dune 2	Shadow	Orange	19m
Dune 3	Brodra	Green	50m
Dune 4	Blue	Grey	24m
Dune 5	Swipe	Black	23m
