= Summerland Point =

- Suburb
- Interactive map of Summerland Point
- Coordinates: 33°08′22″S 151°34′13″E
- Country: Australia
- State: New South Wales
- City: Central Coast
- LGA: Central Coast Council
- Location: 29 km (18 mi) NNE of The Entrance; 21 km (13 mi) SSW of Swansea; 46 km (29 mi) SSW of Newcastle; 51 km (32 mi) NNE of Gosford; 128 km (80 mi) NNE of Sydney

Government
  - State electorate: Swansea
  - Federal division: Shortland
- Elevation: 10 m (33 ft)

Population
  - Total: 2,358 (2011 census)
- Postcode: 2259
- Parish: Wallarah
Suburbs around Summerland Point
Lake Macquarie	Lake Macquarie	Gwandalan
Lake Macquarie	Summerland Point	Gwandalan
Lake Macquarie	Lake Macquarie	Chain Valley Bay

Summerland Point is a waterfront suburb that is located on the Central Coast of New South Wales, Australia. Summerland Point is situated on a peninsula extending northwards and facing towards Lake Macquarie. It is part of the Central Coast Council local government area. It was formerly known as Gwandalan West.

== Overview ==
Due to the access to Lake Macquarie, the rural roads and the lakefront access, Summerland Point is home to the Central Coast Triathlon Club which race there on the last Sunday of every month.

There are no schools in Summerland Point; however, most children there go to Gwandalan Public School or Lake Munmorah High School.

The town is popular with the boating fraternity due to its very sheltered boat launching ramp. The ramp is accessible by most trailerable vessels, which are launched into the sheltered Boat Harbour, a lagoon joined to Lake Macquarie by a short channel. There is also a jetty which has a pump out for marine toilet holding tanks.

The local shops include, as at November 2017, three restaurants (Chinese, Thai and pizza/Italian), a post office, hairdresser, furniture/nicknacks store, bakery cafe, real estate agent, mower shop, bottle shop, fish & chip shop, supermarket and service station. All are located within walking distance of the Boat Harbour.
