= Gwandalan =

- Suburb
- Interactive map of Gwandalan
- Coordinates: 33°07′55″S 151°35′06″E
- Country: Australia
- State: New South Wales
- City: Central Coast
- LGA: Central Coast Council
- Location: 29 km (18 mi) NE of Wyong

Government
  - State electorate: Swansea
  - Federal division: Shortland

Area
  - Total: 7.1 km^{2} (2.7 sq mi)

Population
  - Total: 3,273 (2016 census)
  - Density: 461/km^{2} (1,194/sq mi)
- Postcode: 2259
- Parish: Wallarah
Suburbs around Gwandalan
Lake Macquarie	Point Wolstoncroft	Lake Macquarie
Summerland Point	Gwandalan	Lake Macquarie
Chain Valley Bay	Chain Valley Bay	Crangan Bay

Gwandalan (/ɡwɒndələn/) is a suburb of the Central Coast region of New South Wales, Australia, located on a peninsula extending northwards into Lake Macquarie. It is part of the Central Coast Council local government area.

== Population ==
According to the 2016 census of Population, there were 3,273 people in Gwandalan.

- Aboriginal and Torres Strait Islander people made up 5.6% of the population.
- 86.0% of people were born in Australia and 92.2% of people spoke only English at home.
- The most common responses for religion were Catholic 28.7%, No Religion 27.3% and Anglican 24.2%.

== Name ==
The name Gwandalan is derived from the Aboriginal for restful place.

== School ==
Gwandalan Public School is the only school in Gwandalan. Most Gwandalan Public School students go to Lake Munmorah High School as it is the closest secondary school.
