= Chain Valley Bay =

- Suburb
- Coordinates: 33°10′08″S 151°34′30″E
- Country: Australia
- State: New South Wales
- City: Central Coast
- LGA: Central Coast Council
- Location: 25 km (16 mi) NNE of The Entrance; 16 km (9.9 mi) SSW of Swansea; 44 km (27 mi) SSW of Newcastle; 46 km (29 mi) NNE of Gosford; 123 km (76 mi) NNE of Sydney

Government
  - State electorate: Swansea
  - Federal division: Shortland
- Elevation: 14 m (46 ft)

Population
  - Total: 2,459 (2016 census)
- Postcode: 2259
- Parish: Wallarah
Suburbs around Chain Valley Bay
| Summerland Point | Gwandalan | Crangan Bay |
| Lake Macquarie | Chain Valley Bay | Crangan Bay |
| Doyalson North | Lake Munmorah | Crangan Bay |

Chain Valley Bay is a suburb of the Central Coast region of New South Wales, Australia. It is part of the Central Coast Council local government area.

Chain Valley Bay has a shopping area containing a general store/liquor shop, take away shop and a hairdresser salon.
