= Goongerah =

Goongerah Victoria
- Coordinates: 37°21′0″S 148°42′0″E
- Population: 31 (2021 census)
- Postcode(s): 3888
- Location: 434 km (270 mi) E of Melbourne; 146 km (91 mi) NE of Bairnsdale; 53 km (33 mi) N of Orbost; 65 km (40 mi) S of Delegate (NSW)
- LGA(s): Shire of East Gippsland
- State electorate(s): Gippsland East
- Federal division(s): Division of Gippsland

Goongerah is a locality on the Brodribb River, located in Gippsland, Australia, near Mount Ellery. At the 2021 census, Goongerah had a population of 31.

Goongerah Post Office opened on 21 November 1952 and closed in 1974. Goongerah had one of the smallest primary schools in Victoria, with about 11 students. It closed in 2019.

Goongerah is home to GECO (the Goongerah Environment Centre Office), which is dedicated to fighting for the protection of native forests in East Gippland from logging, such as Goolengook.
