= Heatherbrae, New South Wales =

Heatherbrae
- Suburb
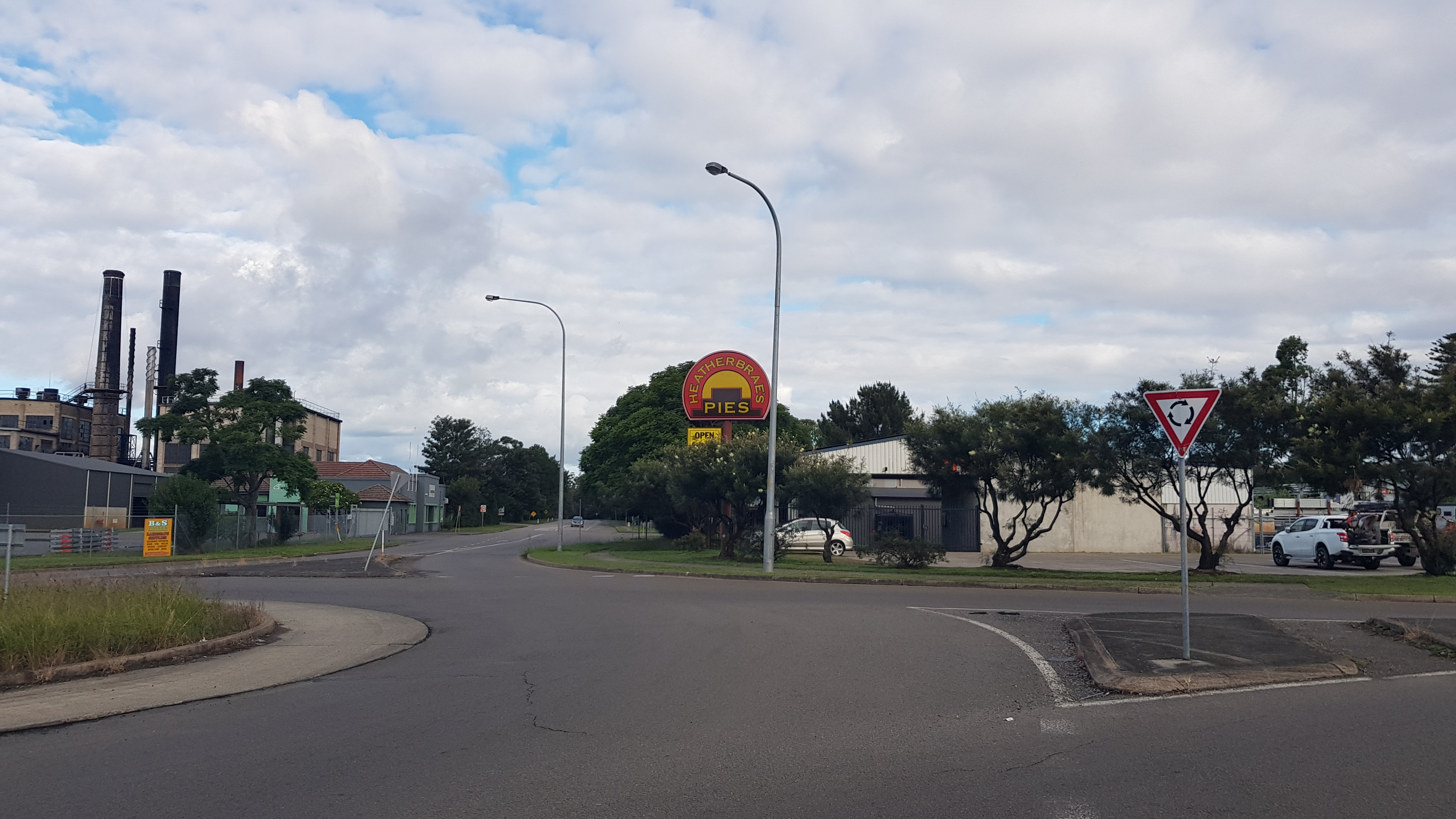
- Clayton Road roundabout, 2023

- Interactive map of Heatherbrae
- Coordinates: 32°46′54″S 151°44′04″E
- Country: Australia
- State: New South Wales
- Region: Hunter
- LGA: Port Stephens Council
- Location: 162 km (101 mi) N of Sydney; 23 km (14 mi) NNW of Newcastle; 4 km (2.5 mi) S of Raymond Terrace

Government
  - State electorate: Port Stephens
  - Federal division: Newcastle

Area (Note: Area calculation is based on 1:100000 map 9232 NEWCASTLE.)
  - Total: 12.7 km^{2} (4.9 sq mi)
- Elevation (Note: Average elevation of the suburb as shown on 1:100000 map 9232 NEWCASTLE.): 10 m (33 ft)

Population
  - Total: 512 (2016 census)
  - Density: 38.7/km^{2} (100/sq mi) (Note: This is the average density of the entire suburb. However, most of the residents live in a small area around the Pacific Highway which forms the ABS Census Collection District. The average population density in this area is approximately 600/km^{2} (1,600/sq mi).)
- Time zone: UTC+10 (AEST)
  - Summer (DST): UTC+11 (AEDT)
- Postcode: 2324
- County: Gloucester
- Parish: Eldon
Suburbs around Heatherbrae
Millers Forest	Raymond Terrace	Raymond Terrace
Millers Forest, Woodberry	Heatherbrae	Raymond Terrace
Woodberry	Tomago	Tomago

Heatherbrae is a suburb of the Port Stephens local government area in the Hunter Region of New South Wales, Australia. It lies to the east of the Hunter River and to the south of the town of Raymond Terrace. It is bisected by the Pacific Highway.

== Geography ==
Most of Heatherbrae's population lives to the west of the Pacific Highway in a housing subdivision while some residents live to the east of the highway in a semi-industrial area. Remaining residents live in rural and semi-rural areas adjacent to the highway and throughout the rest of the suburb.

== History ==
The Worimi people are the traditional owners of the Port Stephens area.

The suburb was bypassed in 2026 when an extension of the Pacific Motorway from Beresfield opened. The section of the Pacific Highway through Heatherbrae now serves local traffic.

== Demographics ==
At the 2016 census, it had a population of 512, and the median age of the population was 54. 80% were born in Australia, 2.6% New Zealand, 2.2% Pakistan, 2.0% England, 1% Germany and 0.8% China.

In terms of religion, 26.1% were Anglican, 21.4% No Religion, 19.0% Catholic, 12.0% Not Stated and 4.5% Uniting Church. In terms of languages spoken other than English, 2.2% speak Urdu, 0.8% Tagalog, 0.6% Italian, 0.6% Serbo-Croatian/Yugoslavian and 0.6% Bengali.

== See also ==
- 2013 New South Wales bushfires
