= Cams Wharf =

- Suburb
- Coordinates: 33°07′34″S 151°36′54″E
- Country: Australia
- State: New South Wales
- LGA: City of Lake Macquarie
- Location: 32 km (20 mi) NNE of The Entrance; 6 km (3.7 mi) S of Swansea; 33 km (21 mi) SSW of Newcastle; 53 km (33 mi) NNE of Gosford; 130 km (81 mi) NNE of Sydney

Government
  - State electorate: Swansea
  - Federal division: Shortland
- Elevation: 7 m (23 ft)

Population
  - Total: 182 (2021 census)
- Postcode: 2281
- Parish: Wallarah
Suburbs around Cams Wharf
Lake Macquarie	Murrays Beach	Murrays Beach
Lake Macquarie	Cams Wharf	Murrays Beach
Nords Wharf	Catherine Hill Bay	Catherine Hill Bay

Cams Wharf is a locality on the Swansea peninsula between Lake Macquarie and the Pacific Ocean in New South Wales, Australia. It is part of the City of Lake Macquarie local government area.
