= Catherine Hill Bay, New South Wales =

Catherine Hill Bay
- Suburb
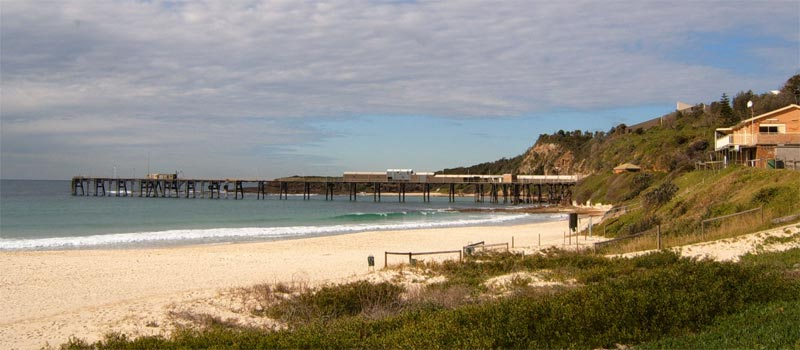
- Catherine Hill Bay coal loading wharf

- Coordinates: 33°09′28″S 151°37′37″E
- Country: Australia
- State: New South Wales
- LGA: City of Lake Macquarie
- Location: 29 km (18 mi) NNE of The Entrance; 9 km (5.6 mi) S of Swansea; 35 km (22 mi) SSW of Newcastle; 51 km (32 mi) NNE of Gosford; 128 km (80 mi) NNE of Sydney

Government
  - State electorate: Swansea
  - Federal division: Shortland

Area
  - Total: 2.1 km^{2} (0.81 sq mi)
- Elevation: 4 m (13 ft)

Population
  - Total: 943 (2021 census)
  - Density: 449/km^{2} (1,163/sq mi)
- Postcode: 2281
- Parish: Wallarah
Suburbs around Catherine Hill Bay
Cams Wharf	Murrays Beach	Pinny Beach
Nords Wharf	Catherine Hill Bay	Pacific Ocean
Crangan Bay	Moonee	Pacific Ocean

Catherine Hill Bay is a coastal bay and village on the southern peninsula forming Lake Macquarie, south of the Pacific Ocean entrance channel at Swansea in New South Wales, Australia. It is part of the City of Lake Macquarie local government area. The village is the oldest continuous settlement in the City of Lake Macquarie. The Aboriginal people in this area, the Awabakal were the first people of this land.

A surf club is sited overlooking the beach that is quite popular for recreation.

== Mining ==
The settlement was first made after land was purchased on 1 April 1865. The town of Cowper was created, to serve as a base for coal mining by the New Wallsend Company in 1873 with the first shipment on 17 December of that year. The name Catherine Hill was adopted to commemorate the schooner Catherine Hill that had run aground in 1867.

Later, the Wallarah Coal Company mined and shipped coal from the area including its nearby Crangan Bay mine. This was taken over by the Coal and Allied Group.

A railway originally was used to transport the coal to the wharf; later, trucks and automated loading belt systems were used.

Rutile was mined from the beach sands during the 1960s.

== Population ==
In the 2016 Census, there were 162 people in Catherine Hill Bay. 89.3% of people were born in Australia and 93.5% of people spoke only English at home. There were 111 private dwellings.

At the 2021 census, the population had increased to 943 people and the number of private dwellings had increased to 404.

== Development ==
Proposals for rezoning and redevelopment of the area for housing were opposed by LMCC and residents as the land was zoned for conservation. Environmentalists contended that the heathlands around the village contained a large variety of wildflowers, some dwarfed into unusual forms from the exposed coastal conditions. On 1 September 2009, a court ruled the development agreement illegal.

However, a new Housing Development of 550 houses was approved by the State Government in 2010. This new subdivision, called Beaches Catherine Hill Bay is outside the visual catchment of the heritage village.

== Heritage listings ==
Catherine Hill Bay has been placed on the State Heritage Register as a Heritage Township:

- No. 208 Radar Station RAAF
- Catherine Hill Bay Cultural Precinct

== Incidents ==
- In April 2024, a 'weather incident' led to the failure of a retaining wall next to a road, causing a landslip. On 5 April, the Lake Macquarie City Council was notified and closed the road to vehicles. While interim measures were implemented, the council stated that they would work on a permanent solution.
- On 20 April 2024, a dam on a construction site overflowed after the village experienced heavy rainfall. Nearby roads and properties were flooded, prompting the police and SES to close a main street.
