= Nords Wharf =

- Suburb
- Coordinates: 33°08′13″S 151°36′17″E
- Country: Australia
- State: New South Wales
- City: Lake Macquarie
- LGA: City of Lake Macquarie
- Location: 31 km (19 mi) NNE of The Entrance; 8 km (5.0 mi) SSW of Swansea; 34 km (21 mi) SSW of Newcastle; 52 km (32 mi) NNE of Gosford; 129 km (80 mi) NNE of Sydney
- Established: 1901

Government
  - State electorate: Swansea
  - Federal division: Shortland

Area
  - Total: 1.2 km^{2} (0.46 sq mi)
- Elevation: 7 m (23 ft)

Population
  - Total: 895 (2021 census)
  - Density: 746/km^{2} (1,930/sq mi)
- Postcode: 2281
- Parish: Wallarah
Suburbs around Nords Wharf
| Lake Macquarie | Cams Wharf | Cams Wharf |
| Lake Macquarie | Nords Wharf | Catherine Hill Bay |
| Crangan Bay | Crangan Bay | Moonee |

Nords Wharf (Awabakal: Kanangra) is a locality south of Swansea on the shore of Lake Macquarie in New South Wales, Australia. It is part of the City of Lake Macquarie local government area.

== History ==
The Aboriginal people, in this area, the Awabakal, were the first people of this land. Their name for the area was Kanangra, and the Awabakal hosted an annual corroboree here in conjunction with the Darkinjung tribe prior to European settlement.

The first school opened in 1901.
