= Munmorah State Conservation Area =

Protected area in New South Wales, Australia

- IUCN category IV (habitat/species management area)
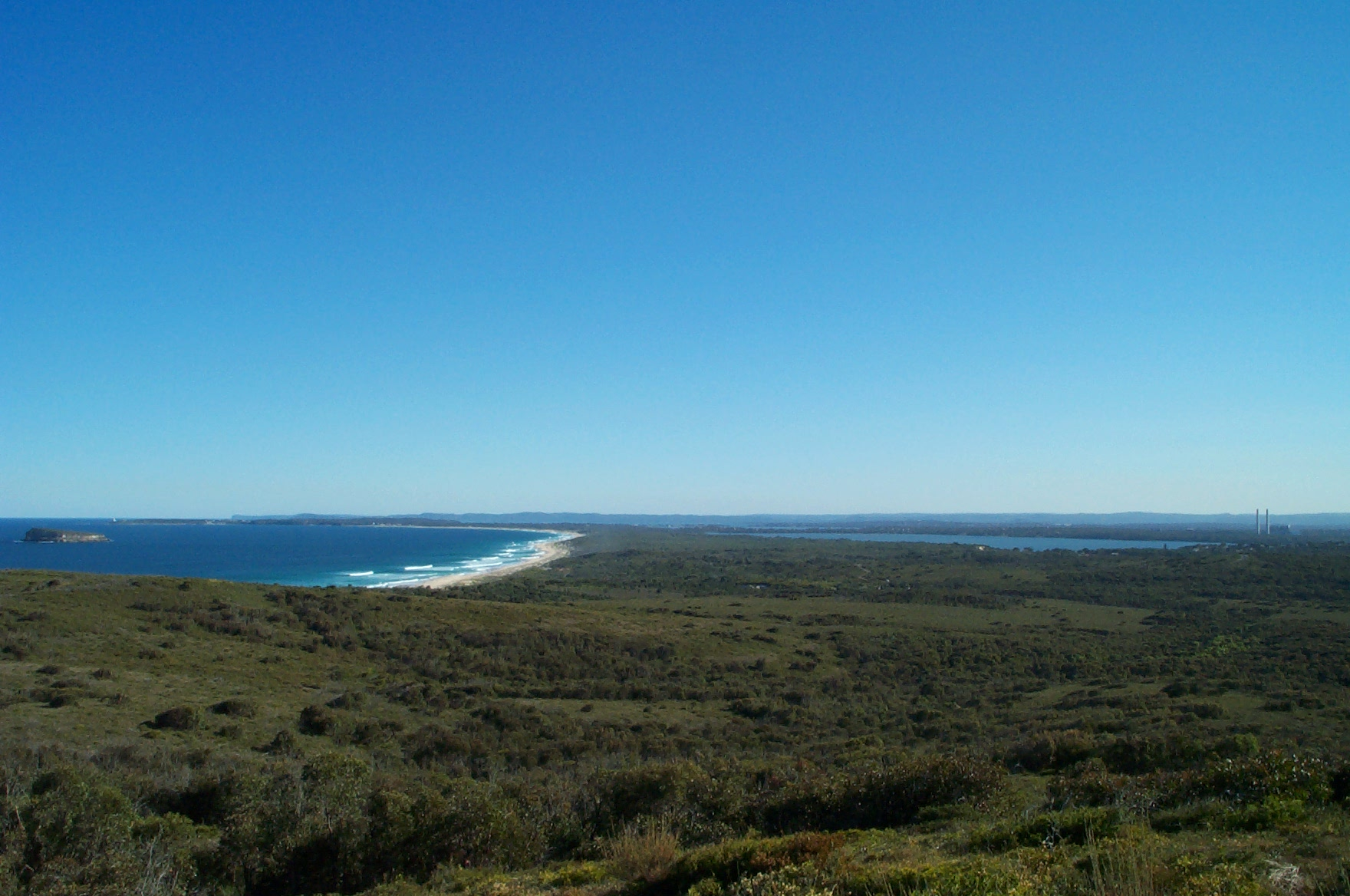

- Location within New South Wales
- Location: New South Wales
- Nearest city: Wyong
- Coordinates: 33.182°S 151.601°E
- Area: 15.3 km^{2} (5.9 sq mi)
- Established: 1 January 1977
- Governing body: NSW National Parks and Wildlife Service

Munmorah State Conservation Area is located on the Central Coast of New South Wales, Australia. The area's coastal setting and panoramic views, perched sand dunes, diverse vegetation communities, protected threatened species and migratory bird habitats, together with opportunities for nature based recreation and for educational and scientific study, were cited as reasons for the reserve's creation. The reserve is part of the Tuggerah Important Bird Area, identified as such by BirdLife International because of its importance for a variety of water and woodland birds.

The area is located at an estimated altitude of 50 meters.

== Places of interest ==
- Birdie Beach (Includes area for unclad bathing)
- Tea Tree Picnic Area - Gas barbecues
- Frazer Beach
- Palms Picnic Area
- The Palms Walking Track
- Wybung Trig Lookout
- Snapper Point

== History ==
The land now occupied by Munmorah State Conservation Area was first inhabited by the Guringai/Wannangine people and the Awabakal people. The Guringai/Wannangine people occupied the southern section and the Awabakal occupied the northern section. It is believed Europeans first discovered the Tuggerah Lakes in 1796. It was found by Governor of Tasmania, Colonel David Collins, who had arrived on the First Fleet, during the search for an escaped convict woman, Mary Morgan, who was said to be living with the Aborigines to the north of the Hawkesbury River.

Large areas of forest in the Conservation Area were burnt out during bushfires in October 2013.

== See also ==
- Protected areas of New South Wales (Australia)
