= Lake Macquarie Airport =

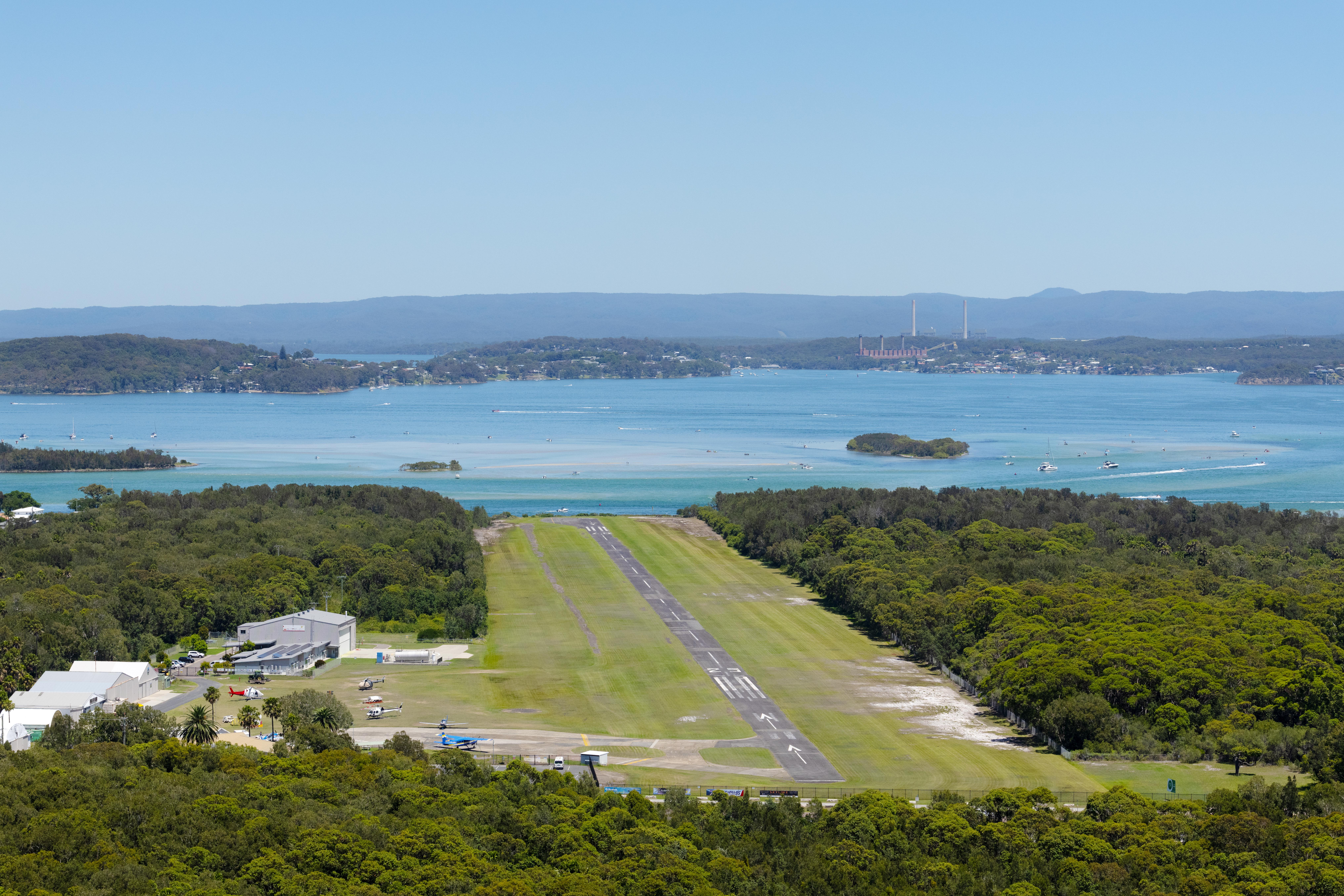
- Lake Macquarie Airport at Pelican, New South Wales
- IATA: BEO; ICAO: YLMQ

Summary
- Airport type: Private
- Owner: Private consortium
- Serves: City of Lake Macquarie
- Location: Marks Point, New South Wales, Australia
- Elevation AMSL: 5 ft / 2 m
- Coordinates: 33°04′00″S 151°38′54″E
- Website: lakemacquarieairport.com.au

Map
- Location in New South Wales

Runways
Direction	Length		Surface
Direction	m	ft	Surface
07/25	880	2,887	Bitumen
- Source: AIP Enroute Supplement

Lake Macquarie Airport (IATA: BEO, ICAO: YLMQ) (formerly Belmont Airport – ICAO: YPEC) is an airfield located in the Lake Macquarie suburb of Marks Point, 15 km (9.3 mi) south of Newcastle, New South Wales, Australia. The airport is located on a narrow peninsula between the Pacific Highway and a shallow tidal inlet that forms the entrance to Lake Macquarie.

== History ==
An airfield located between the suburbs of Swansea and Belmont was first proposed by local resident Keith Hilder, who intended to develop the site to host a flying school and air charter service. Approval was granted by the Department of Civil Aviation in 1962, with construction of a sealed runway and control tower completed by 1968. Although the site was already constrained, local residents opposed any expansion of the airport that would allow longer runways and expanded passenger services using larger aircraft.

For most of its history, the airfield functioned as the base for Aeropelican formed by Hilder in 1971. Aeropelican operated commuter flights to and from Sydney using DHC-6 Twin Otters. Once these services were withdrawn in 2006, the airfield was sold to Mirvac for $5.5 million in 2008.

There were a number of attempts to restore the airport as an aviation facility following the withdrawal of Aeropelican, particularly with the closure and redevelopment of Cooranbong Airport, another privately owned airfield located to the west of Lake Macquarie. At the time of the 2008 sale, the Central Coast Aero Club was reported to have struck a deal with Mirvac to purchase the airport as a base of operations in exchange for the redevelopment of Warnervale Airport, owned by the club. This deal did not eventuate.

Lake Macquarie City Council expressed an interest in maintaining the site for aviation uses. Although the airport is privately owned and council has limited control over the site, zoning restrictions encourage future aviation use. The council rejected a proposal by Mirvac to redevelop the airport into housing estates. Instead, the council's Lifestyle 2030 Strategy development plan, published in March 2013 identifies the airport as having "ongoing potential for use by commuter aircraft" to serve Sydney and regional areas while generating business and employment opportunities.

In 2013, a consortium represented by Skyline Aviation Group and Red Bull Air Race pilot Matt Hall were reported as being close to closing a deal with Mirvac to purchase the airport, but backed out of negotiations before the deal could be finalised. At the same time Mirvac was involved in separate negotiations with Anthony Penn Boucaut, founder of Skydive the Beach, to purchase the property. Ironically, Hall and Boucaut knew each other, but neither knew or believed there was another party bidding for the airfield until the matter came up in conversation. Boucaut also knew James Guest from Skyline Aviation, and both Rob Hibberd and Ricky Duncan from Airborne Windsports and the purchasing consortium was formed.

=== Redevelopment ===
In July 2014, negotiations led by Airborne Windsports, Matt Hall Racing, Skyline Aviation Group, Anthony Penn Boucaut and a private investor concluded successfully, with airport upgrade works planned to commence immediately.

Construction of a $5.5 million aeromedical base for use by New South Wales Ambulance and the Westpac Lifesaver Rescue Helicopter Service was completed in 2017. Lake Macquarie City Council approved construction of a number of hangars (including office space and pilot's briefing rooms), as well as a two-storey terminal building with a cafe or restaurant in August 2018, although as of January 2022, little progress had been made on these works. Further planned improvements include extended taxiways, additional car parking and on-site accommodation for visiting pilots.

== Airport facilities ==
The airfield has a single runway 07/25, 880 m (2,890 ft) long with a sealed bitumen surface, although the available takeoff and landing distances are shorter and there is a displaced threshold to allow sufficient clearance over the Pacific Highway, at the eastern end of the runway. As of 2020, there was no runway lighting or fuel facility available at Lake Macquarie Airport. Pilots utilise a Common Traffic Advisory Frequency (CTAF) to safely co-ordinate arrivals and departures as there is no control tower located at this airport. Under current guidelines, the Civil Aviation Safety Authority has classified Belmont as an Aircraft Landing Area (ALA) as due to land constraints the site infrastructure does not meet the dimensions required to operate as a registered airport, placing some restriction on future uses for commercial passenger flights.

== Operations ==
Current operations include aeromedical retrieval and search and rescue services across northern New South Wales by NSW Ambulance and the Westpac Life Saver Rescue Helicopter Service from their base from the airport. Other tenants at Lake Macquarie Airport include nationwide skydiving company, Skydive the Beach and Beyond, whose Newcastle tandem skydiving drop zone operates here, along with Matt Hall Racing. Ultralight trike and gyrocopter manufacturer Airborne Australia also maintain facilities and offer training at the airport.

== See also ==
- List of airports in New South Wales
