= Pelican, New South Wales =

Pelican New South Wales
- Coordinates: 33°04′34″S 151°38′50″E
- Population: 874 (2021 census)
  - Density: 1,250/km^{2} (3,230/sq mi)
- Postcode(s): 2281
- Elevation: 3 m (10 ft)
- Area: 0.7 km^{2} (0.3 sq mi)
- Location: 25 km (16 mi) SSW of Newcastle; 3 km (2 mi) NNE of Swansea; 40 km (25 mi) NNE of The Entrance; 62 km (39 mi) NNE of Gosford; 140 km (87 mi) NNE of Sydney
- LGA(s): City of Lake Macquarie
- Parish: Kahibah
- State electorate(s): Swansea
- Federal division(s): Shortland
Suburbs around Pelican:
Lake Macquarie	Marks Point	Blacksmiths
Lake Macquarie	Pelican	Blacksmiths
Little Pelican	Blacksmiths	Blacksmiths

Pelican is a suburb of the City of Lake Macquarie in New South Wales, Australia, located 25 kilometres (16 mi) from Newcastle's central business district across the entrance to Lake Macquarie from the town of Swansea. It was known as Pelican Flat until 1991.

The Aboriginal people, in this area, the Awabakal, were the first people of this land.

The public school opened in 1938.
