= 2023 Australian winter =

The 2023 Australian Winter was the warmest on record, showing an average of 1.53 °C above the 1961–1990 average. The winter began on June 22 at the winter solstice, and concluded with the September equinox on September 23. The meteorological winter began on June 1, and finished on 31 August.

== Seasonal forecasts ==
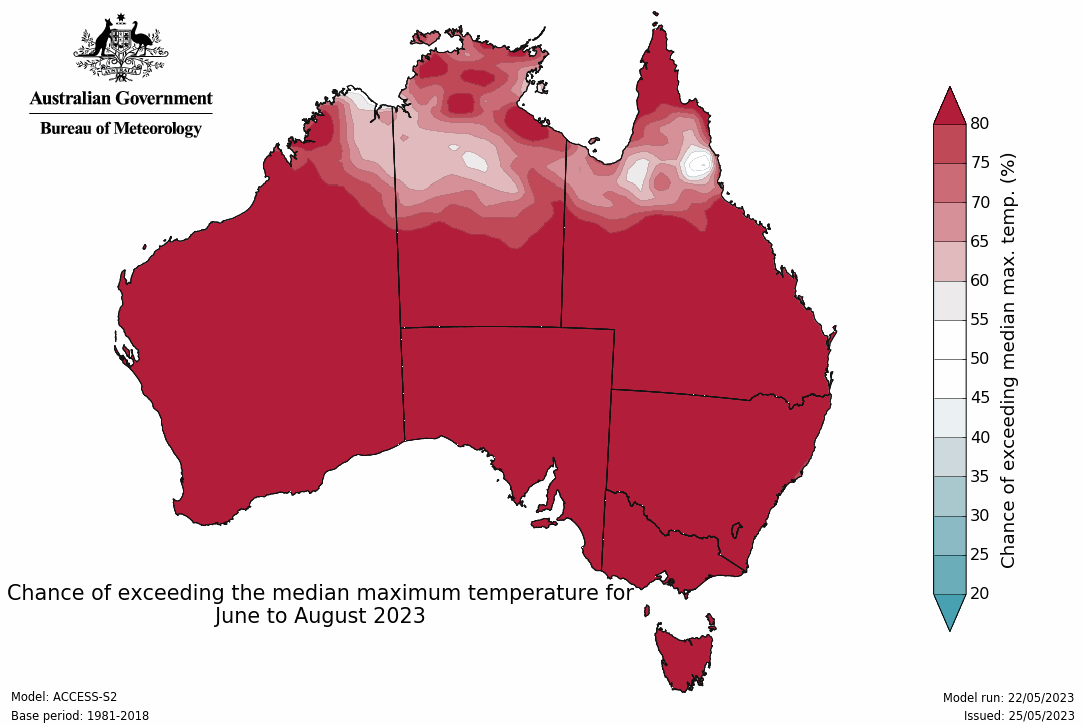
Temperature outlook (max)

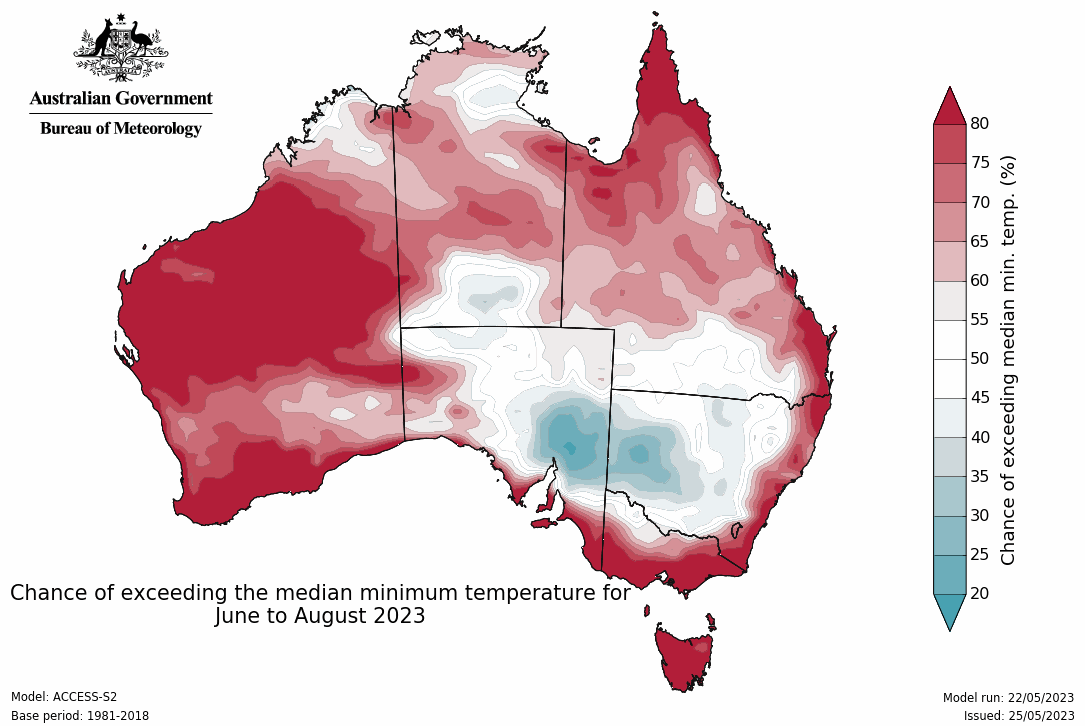
Temperature outlook (min)

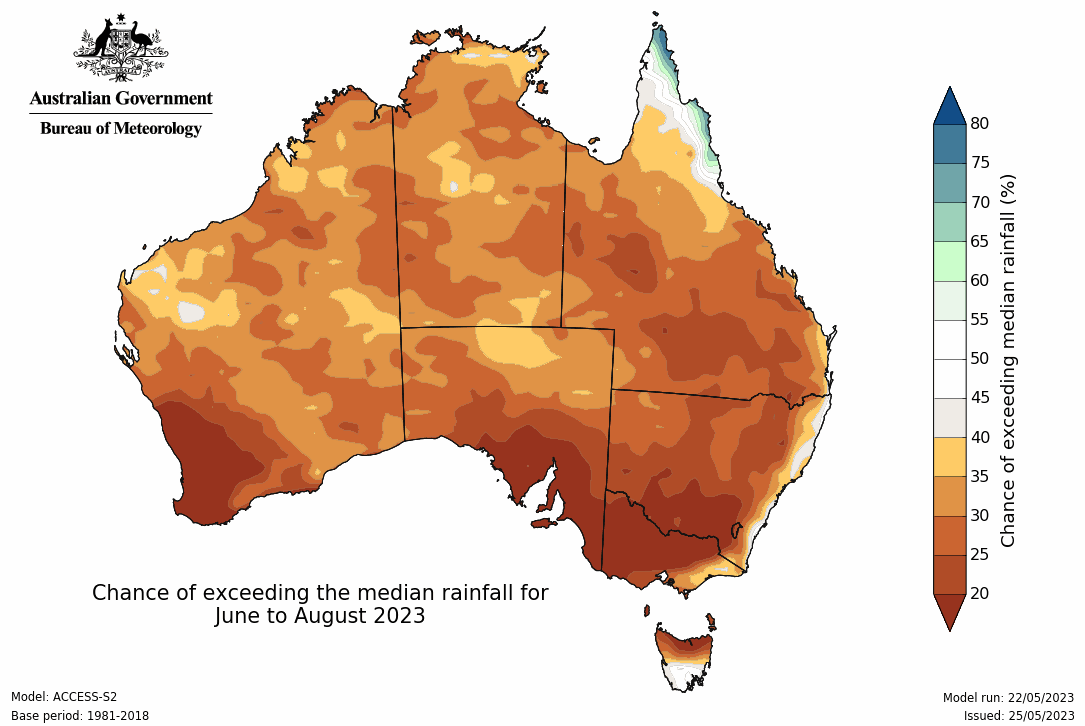
Precipitation outlook

On May 25, 2023, the Australian Bureau of Meteorology released their forecasts for the upcoming winter. The maximum and minimum temperatures were predicted to be very likely (>80% chance) to exceed the average recorded between 1981 and 2018.

The precipitation levels during this time were predicted to have between a 20 and 40% chance of exceeding the accepted median for most of the country, however far northern Queensland showed signs of having above average rainfall.

Due to the El Niño and positive IOD (Indian Ocean Dipole), snowfall was forecasted to be below average for the season in the Australian Alps. Based on previous snow measurements at Spencer's Creek, NSW dating back to 1954, the average snow season in Australia tended to peak at around 198 cm, however the forecast predicted a drop in about 36 cm.

== Seasonal summary ==
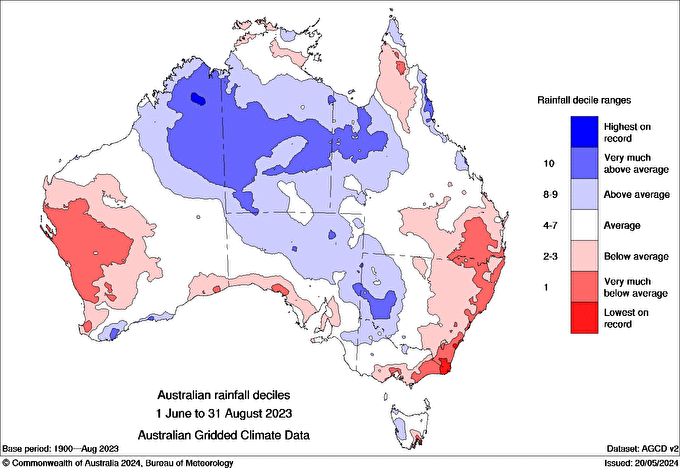
Average precipitation deciles in Australia between June and August in winter.

Queensland experienced its warmest June on record, and in July, most of Tasmania and south-eastern Australia also saw their warmest July ever. In August, the national mean maximum temperature was the second highest on record, with daytime temperatures ranking in the top 10% of historical observations across most of the country. Precipitation levels in the country tended to be below average in coastal city suburban areas, however well above average in north-central Australia. Overall, the year showed slightly above average precipitation at just over 1.6% above the mean.

Snowfall in the Australian Alps started off slow, and peaked at 131 cm as of July 13. This was the lowest reading since the 2006 season which had a peak of 85.1cms. These low levels of snow could be attributed to the below average levels of precipitation and abnormally high temperatures seen throughout the season. Because of this, all of the Australian ski resorts had to postpone their opening day. A series of cold fronts delivered in the later stages of June, most notably between 19 and 20 getting 30–35 cm, and June 22–27 delivering between 55 and 80 cm of snow. On July 8, a snowstorm passed through, dumping fresh powder. Poor conditions following this led to a period of low snowmaking and overall a below-average season with many runs on some mountains being shut for the remainder of the season. The season ended prematurely compared to previous years due to the conditions.

== Events ==
Over the course of the 2023 Australian winter, despite the above average temperature deciles during this time, a number of events occurred during this time including cold fronts and occasional above average levels of precipitation.

=== Early season cold fronts ===
In the months leading up to winter, Australia had a number of mild cold fronts, notably in early March and early May. From March 6-10, temperatures began to decline rapidly due to high levels of wind and above average levels of precipitation, most notably in the southeast. Some parts of western Tasmania recorded some snowfall as well as rainfall measured at 50-100mm.

March followed with more cold fronts, bring high levels of wind and precipitation further contributing to the lower temperatures experienced at this time. On May 7, Cooma airport in New South Wales recorded 2.7 °C, their lowest ever maximum temperature for the month of May. Heavy hail was also recorded during this time in the ACT and Victoria. The Alpine regions also received their first large snow-shower, receiving between 10 and 20 cm of snow.

June brought even more cold fronts and even higher levels of rainfall especially in the south. This weather included storms, rainfall, strong wind, and some, although below average, snow. South Australia received a dumping of rainfall, recording between 50 and 80mm in Adelaide Hills, and subsequently flash flooding. In the early morning of June 9, South Australia the highest daily rainfall totals in over 100 years.

=== Mid-season cold fronts ===
The ski season had to be delayed due to far below average snowfall throughout the earliest parts of June, which began to turn around towards the latter half. On June 18, Mt Hotham received 40 cm of snow, whilst other resorts still received more snowfall courtesy of the cold fronts passing through the region at the time.

From late June to early July, northern Australia received unusually high amounts of rainfall, averaging from 10 to 70mm daily whilst these regions usually receive totals of less than 50mm during Winter. Temperatures dropped on average more than 10 °C below the 1951-1990 average in parts of northern Western Australia, the Northern Territory, and in some parts of western Queensland. On July 7 and 8, a strong cold front followed by a deep low-pressure system hit south-east Australia, leading to significantly below average temperatures during this time. This was followed by powerful winds and high rainfall exceeding 40mm in some parts of the Tasmania and Victoria. As a result, flooding warnings were issued across these regions. This cold front brought over 20 cm of snow to the alpine regions, and snowmaking was also thriving in these conditions.

The remainder of July brought significantly drier conditions as a result of the high-pressure systems moving through the regions. In the south-east, daily minimum temperatures stayed low, and as a result, many stations across the country experienced their coldest July minimum temperatures on record. Canberra during this time experienced 12 consecutive days of sub-zero temperatures for the first time since 1994.

=== Late season dry conditions ===
August was fairly uneventful for the most part due to the drier conditions. As a result, snowfall was lacklustre, with the last major snowfall of between 5 and 15 cm recorded on August 18. Furthermore, temperatures began a steep incline towards the end to the winter. The season ended the warmest it has been since 1910, recording 1.54 °C above average, compared to the previous 1910 record of 1.46 °C.

== See also ==
- Winter storm
- Weather of 2023
