= Moree Airport =

Airport in Moree, New South Wales, Australia

- IATA: MRZ; ICAO: YMOR

Summary
- Airport type: Public
- Operator: Moree Plains Shire Council
- Location: Moree, New South Wales
- Elevation AMSL: 701 ft (214 m)
- Coordinates: 29°29′56″S 149°50′41″E
- Website: www.mpsc.nsw.gov.au

Map
- Location in New South Wales

Runways
Direction	Length		Surface
Direction	m	ft	Surface
01/19	1,613	5,292	Asphalt
05/23	977	3,205	Gravel

Statistics (2021-22)
- Passengers: 18,073
- Aircraft movements: 874*
- Regular Public Transport operations only Sources: Australian AIP and aerodrome chart and Bureau of Infrastructure, Transport and Regional Economics

Moree Airport (IATA: MRZ, ICAO: YMOR) is an airport in Moree, New South Wales, Australia. The airport is 5 km (3.1 mi) from the city centre. The airport has some scheduled services but mainly provides general aviation facilities, maintenance and support for agricultural aviation in the local area. The Moree Aero Club has been based at the airport since 1952, and today provides aircraft hire and flight training. The club was instrumental in providing many early improvements to the aerodrome facilities, including hangars and a terminal building. In the 2021-22 Financial Year, Moree Airport handled 18,073 passengers, down from approximately 35,000 per year before travel restrictions were introduced as a result of the response to the COVID-19 pandemic.

== Airport facilities ==
Moree Airport has two operational runways. The primary runway 01/19 is sealed with an asphalt surface 1,613 m × 30 m (5,290 ft × 100 ft). This runway is equipped with pilot-operated lighting for night operations, as well as precision approach path indicator installations at each end. A secondary runway 05/23 is located on the western side of the field and is 977 m × 18 m (3,210 ft × 60 ft). Although this runway strip itself is constructed from gravel, the central 10 m (30 ft) is maintained as a sealed surface. The airport does not have a control tower as the typical volume of traffic is not high. Pilots are required to communicate via a Common Traffic Advisory Frequency (CTAF) to safely co-ordinate arrivals and departures. A Non-Directional Beacon (NDB) to the west of the airport is the only navigational aid.

The small passenger terminal and apron are located on the eastern side of the airport, with road access off the Newell Highway. On the western side of the airport is an area primarily used to support agricultural crop spraying and other associated airwork.

== Airlines and destinations ==
Airlines	Destinations
QantasLink	Sydney

The Moree-Sydney route is one of 14 within New South Wales regulated by the state government. Prior to 30 March 2013, the route had been served by up to 20 weekly QantasLink flights, using Bombardier Dash 8 turboprop airliners. Controversially, this ended with the awarding of the licence to Brindabella Airlines on behalf of Transport New South Wales following a tender process. The move was met by considerable opposition within the Moree community, with concerns being raised about a lack of consultation, reduced baggage allowance, loss of frequent flyer program benefits as well as smaller aircraft operating the route and less operational flexibility in the event of delays or cancellations. Prior to 27 January 2012, Brindabella Airlines operated weekday services to Brisbane, but these flights ceased after the company reviewed services to the region following a merger with Aeropelican, a move which damaged the airline's reputation in the local community. In December 2013, concerns relating to overdue maintenance on some of its aircraft led to the Civil Aviation Safety Authority grounding Brindabella Airlines. The airline was subsequently put into receivership and ceased operations, with the Sydney-Moree route licence returning to QantasLink.

In July 2016, Fly Corporate announced that it would begin services between Moree and Brisbane from August 2016 using Fairchild Metro aircraft. The airline withdrew from the route in March 2019.

Annual passenger statistics between Sydney and Moree
Year	Passenger numbers
2007–08	25,641
2008–09	25,625
2009–10	26,976
2010–11	28,047

Annual passenger and aircraft statistics for Moree Airport
Year	Revenue passengers	Aircraft movements (Regular Public Transport operations only)
2001–02	19,507	1,556
2002–03	18,594	1,383
2003–04	20,413	1,382
2004–05	21,983	1,388
2005–06	20,959	1,336
2006–07	21,774	1,312
2007–08	29,686	1,354
2008–09	26,728	1,278
2009–10	26,978	1,035
2010–11	32,233	1,548
2011–12	28,243	1,219

== Incidents and accidents ==
- On the evening of 30 March 2011, a privately operated Piper PA-32R-301T Turbo Saratoga struck trees and crashed approximately 550 m (1,800 ft) short of the threshold on approach to runway 19. Of the pilot and five passengers aboard, four were fatally injured. Three members of the same well known family who ran local farming, hardware and petroleum businesses were killed. The pilot was also a well respected local businessman. During the approach, which was made after dusk, the aircraft flew too low, struck treetops on the fenceline of a nearby caravan park, and came to rest upside down in an adjacent field. The aircraft was found to be overloaded, and the pilot's lack of recent night flying experience was a contributing factor.
- On 11 April 2012, an Ayres S2R-G10 Thrush crop dusting aircraft impacted terrain about 36 km (22 mi) northwest of the airport, killing the pilot who was the only occupant. The aircraft was on a ferry flight from St George, Queensland en route to Moree Airport.

== See also ==
- List of airports in New South Wales
