= Marks Point, New South Wales =

Marks Point Lake Macquarie, New South Wales
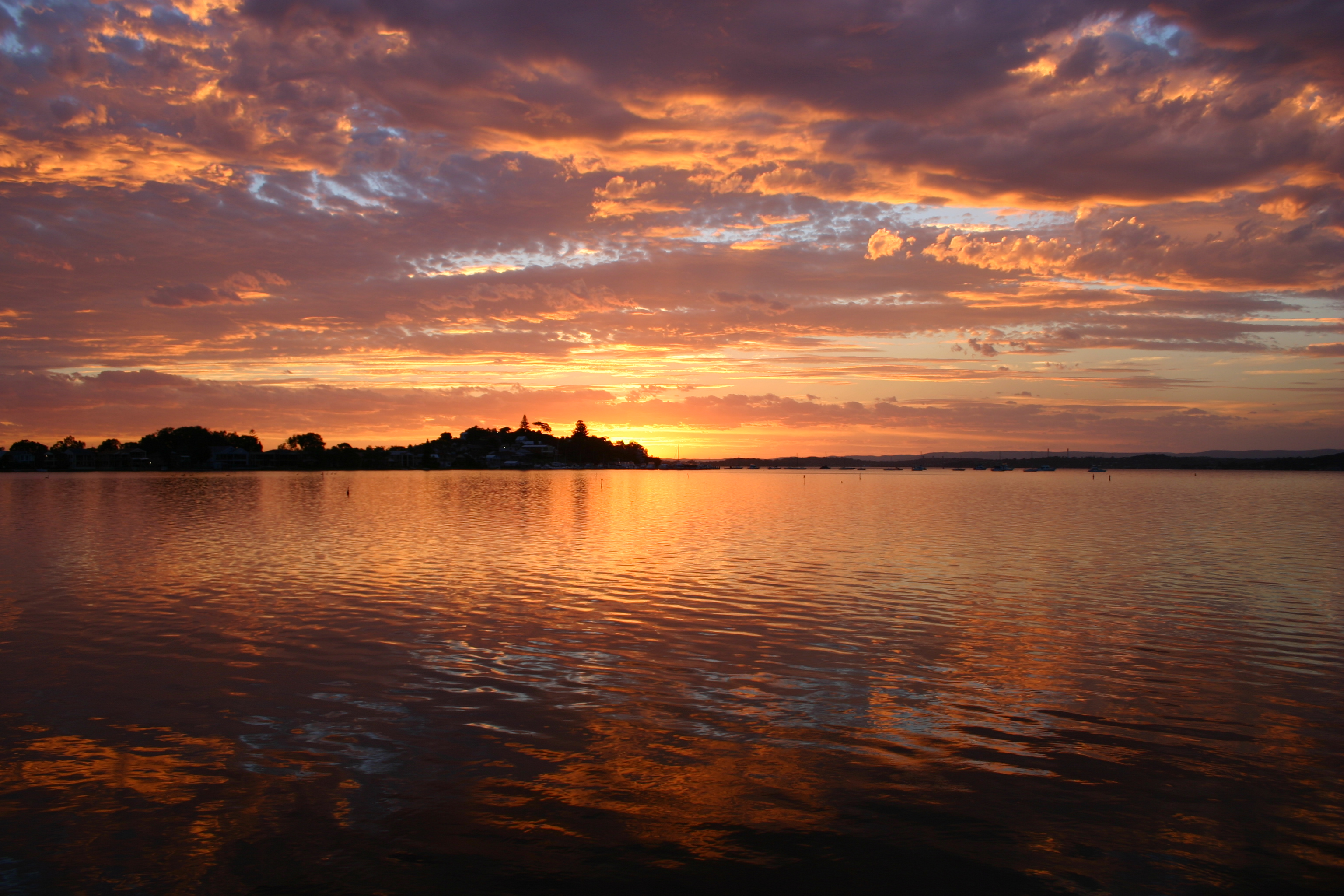
- Marks Point, as seen view from Cane Point (in Belmont South), across Village Bay

- Coordinates: 33°03′36″S 151°39′04″E
- Population: 1,861 (2021 census)
  - Density: 716/km^{2} (1,850/sq mi)
- Established: 1876
- Postcode(s): 2280
- Elevation: 4 m (13 ft)
- Area: 2.6 km^{2} (1.0 sq mi)
- Location: 23 km (14 mi) SSW of Newcastle; 5 km (3 mi) N of Swansea; 43 km (27 mi) NNE of The Entrance; 64 km (40 mi) NNE of Gosford; 141 km (88 mi) NNE of Sydney
- LGA(s): City of Lake Macquarie
- Parish: Kahibah
- State electorate(s): Swansea
- Federal division(s): Shortland
Suburbs around Marks Point:
Lake Macquarie		Belmont South
Lake Macquarie	Marks Point	Belmont South
Pelican	Pelican	Blacksmiths

Marks Point is a suburb of the City of Lake Macquarie in New South Wales, Australia, located 23 kilometres (14 mi) from Newcastle's central business district and forming a small peninsula extending into the eastern side of Lake Macquarie. The Aboriginal people, the Awabakal, were the first people in the area.

== History ==
The suburb is named after the Marks brothers, and is one of the oldest suburbs in the Lake Macquarie area.

Local businesses in Marks Point include a marina, post office, two cafes, newsagency, hairdressing salon, take away and bowling club. There is also a Public School, child care centre and a community hall available for hire which backs onto the local soccer field. As of the 2006 census, 23.0% of homes in the northeast of the suburb were Housing Commission properties, compared to 2.8% in other parts of the suburb.

Marks Point and nearby areas were until recently serviced by the nearby Belmont Airport (IATA Code – BEO) in the suburb's south, which has since been closed down for redevelopment.

It is named after Charles Marks who had an orchard there.

Early settlers Henry and Charles were brothers of Maurice Marks, an early settler in Belmont. Henry bought the land at the Point and he and Charles went into partnership in an orchard. In 1885 he sold this to Charles, who lived on at Marks Point until he died.

The Marks brothers' orchard grew oranges and pineapples. In the 1920s there were still Chinese Market Gardens near the present Marks Point Public School. Charlie Hollis operated a slipway and marine business in Edith Street from 1954 to 1980, when it became Marks Point Marina.
