= Blacksmiths, New South Wales =

Blacksmiths
- Suburb
- Coordinates: 33°04′26″S 151°39′25″E
- Country: Australia
- State: New South Wales
- City: Newcastle
- LGA: City of Lake Macquarie
- Location: 24 km (15 mi) SSW of Newcastle; 3 km (1.9 mi) NE of Swansea; 39 km (24 mi) NNE of The Entrance; 61 km (38 mi) NNE of Gosford; 138 km (86 mi) NNE of Sydney
- Established: 1948

Government
  - State electorate: Swansea
  - Federal division: Shortland

Area
  - Total: 1.8 km^{2} (0.69 sq mi)
- Elevation: 5 m (16 ft)

Population
  - Total: 1,881 (SAL 2021)
- Postcode: 2281
- Parish: Kahibah
Suburbs around Blacksmiths
Marks Point	Belmont South
Pelican	Blacksmiths	Tasman Sea
Little Pelican

Blacksmiths is a coastal suburb of the City of Lake Macquarie in New South Wales, Australia adjacent to the Pacific Ocean 24 kilometres (15 mi) south of Newcastle's central business district, between the suburbs of Belmont and Swansea.

== Facilities ==
Within Blacksmiths are Blacksmiths Beach and the southern section of Nine Mile Beach, the Blacksmiths Nature Reserve, a primary school, soccer club and caravan park.

== See also ==
- Bahtabah Local Aboriginal Land Council
