= Little Pelican =

- Suburb
- Coordinates: 33°04′52″S 151°38′38″E
- Country: Australia
- State: New South Wales
- LGA: City of Lake Macquarie
- Location: 26 km (16 mi) SSW of Newcastle; 2 km (1.2 mi) N of Swansea; 40 km (25 mi) NNE of The Entrance; 61 km (38 mi) NNE of Gosford; 139 km (86 mi) NNE of Sydney

Government
  - State electorate: Swansea
  - Federal division: Shortland
- Elevation: 3 m (9.8 ft)

Population
  - Total: 0 (2021 census)
- Postcode: 2281
- Parish: Kahibah
Suburbs around Little Pelican
Swansea Channel	Pelican	Pelican
Swansea Channel	Little Pelican	Blacksmiths
Swansea Channel	Swansea Channel	Pacific Ocean

Little Pelican is a suburb of the City of Lake Macquarie in New South Wales, Australia, located 26 kilometres (16 mi) south of Newcastle's central business district across the entrance to Lake Macquarie from the town of Swansea. It consists of a reserve and caravan park along Swansea Channel, and is traversed by the Pacific Highway.
