= Swansea Public School =

Location
- Swansea; New South Wales; Australia
- Coordinates: 33.084128°S 151.635988°E

Information
- Former name: Galgabba Private School; Galgabba Public School; Swansea Central School
- Motto: Strive to do well
- Established: 1 April 1875
- Principal: Brett Carr
- Enrollment: 204
- Language: English
- Website: swansea-p.schools.nsw.gov.au

Swansea Public School is a school in Lake Macquarie, Australia. It was founded in 1875.

In 2024, the school had 204 students. 25% of students had Aboriginal ancestry.

== History ==
The school was formed in 1875 as Galgabba Private School, with Galgabba being the Awabakal name for Swansea. It started out as a single room with one teacher. The school was on the property of Thomas Boyd in Swansea South, with 23 children enrolled. Thomas Boyd was one of the earliest European settlers in Swansea. The school was originally near a camp for workers building the walls along the Swansea Channel. The school moved to its current location in 1885, and began using the Swansea name in 1889.

In 1922, it was found that students were having lessons in an "open weather shed" with no roof and no desks. In 1923, the local Progress Association discussed the condition of the school and how to have it improved by the Department of Education. In 1924, the school was only two wooden one-room buildings. The space was suitable for 92 students, but the enrollment was 181.

In 1929, the school was approved for a new classroom and a staff room. But in the early 1930s, the school was still significantly overcrowded, with funding for expansions unavailable. Classes were being held in the shed and on the porch for lack of space.

In April 1937, a new school building was opened, in line with the school's fiftieth anniversary. By this time, the school had ten rooms, eleven staff members, and 460 students.

During World War II, students raised money for the Junior Red Cross to support the war effort. In 1944, the school was given the classification of a central school. It reverted back to public school classification in 1954. The school building was damaged by arson in 1980 and subsequently demolished.

In 2015 during the Hunter Valley Storms, the school was closed for multiple days.

== Parents and Citizens Association ==
The Parents and Citizens Association was formed in 1910, after a meeting's unanimous decision to create one. In 1928, the Parents and Citizens Association gave Christmas presents to students. The Parents and Citizens Association was still active in 2024.
