= Brindabella Airlines =

Regional airline of Australia (1994–2013)

IATA	ICAO	Call sign
FQ	BRI	BRINDABELLA
- Founded: March 1994
- Ceased operations: 14 December 2013
- Operating bases: Brisbane; Newcastle; Sydney
- Fleet size: 12 (December 2013)
- Headquarters: Canberra Airport
- Key people: Paul Schutz (CEO); James Blake (CCO)
- Founder: Lara Corry
- Website: www.brindabellaairlines.com.au

Brindabella Airlines was an Australian regional airline established in 1994. Its headquarters were at Canberra Airport. On 15 December 2013 the airline was placed in receivership.

== History ==
Brindabella Airlines was founded by Lara Corry in March 1994 initially as an air charter service. It was named after the Brindabella Range. Lara married Jeff Boyd who owned an aircraft maintenance business (WFL Engineering) later that year. The two businesses worked side by side until 2000 when they merged. In 2000, Brindabella Airlines added a flight training school to its operations; and in April 2003 commenced scheduled regional airline services from Canberra to Albury, Newcastle and Wagga Wagga. The flight training school closed in March 2010.

In May 2008 Brindabella Airlines introduced BAe Jetstream 41 aircraft. Brindabella took delivery of two J41s in December 2007. The Jetstream aircraft operated primarily on the Brisbane to Tamworth and Canberra to Newcastle routes.

In 2011 Lara and Jeff Boyd sold the airline to Business Air Holdings, itself owned by former Grand Prix motorcycle racing competitors Roger Burnett and James Toseland; and Ian Woodley, the Chairman of BMI Regional owner Sector Aviation Holdings. Business Air Holdings also owned Aeropelican Air Services.

In July 2013 the operations of Aeropelican Air Services and Brindabella were integrated under the Brindabella name. In July 2013 Brindabella entered a codeshare agreement with Qantas.

=== Groundings and collapse ===
In November 2013 the Civil Aviation Safety Authority (CASA) grounded four of the airline's aircraft due to overdue engine inspections. Qantas then revoked its codeshare agreement with Brindabella.

On 12 December 2013, CASA grounded another six aircraft due to overdue maintenance, which caused the airline to cancel most of its flights. On 14 December 2013 the airline suddenly announced an immediate "temporary" suspension of all services.

On 15 December 2013, KordaMentha was appointed as receiver for the airline. On 23 December 2013 it was announced that most of the 140 employees would be retrenched, with a dozen kept on to maintain the aircraft.

== Destinations ==
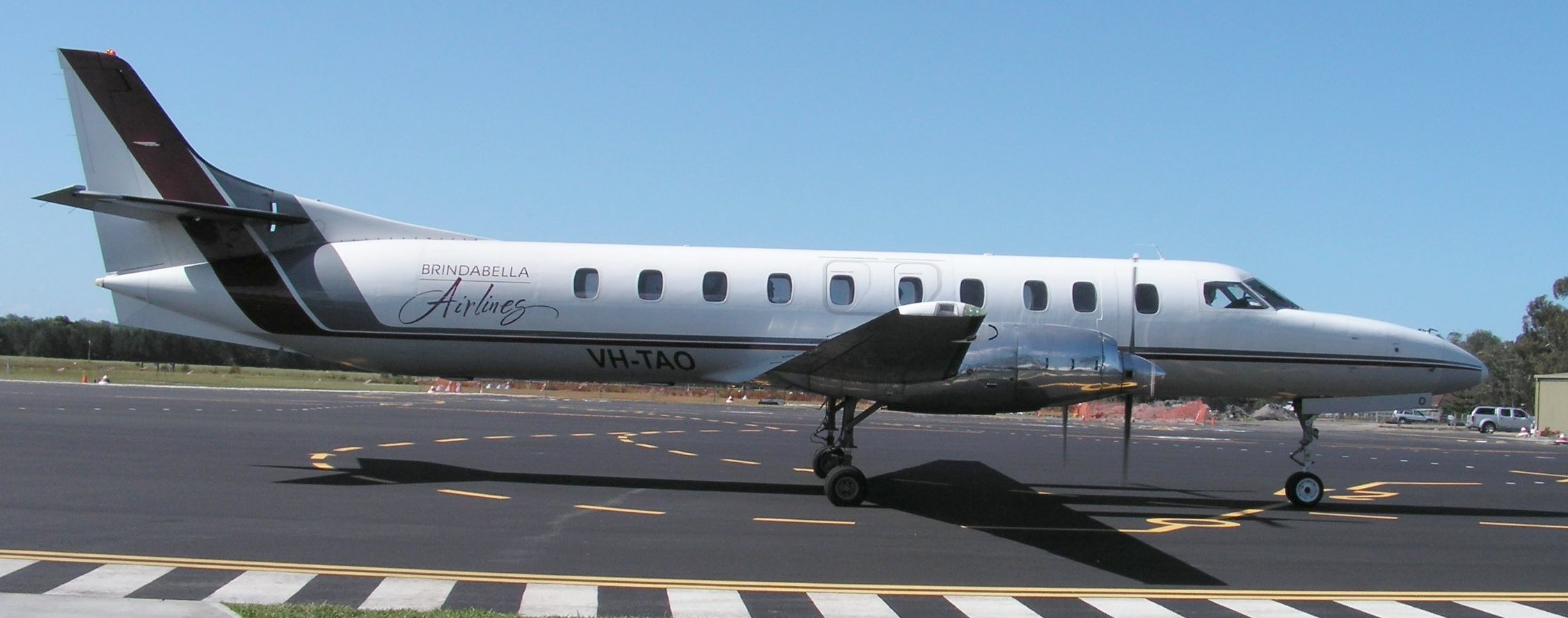
Fairchild SA227-AC Metro III at Port Macquarie Airport

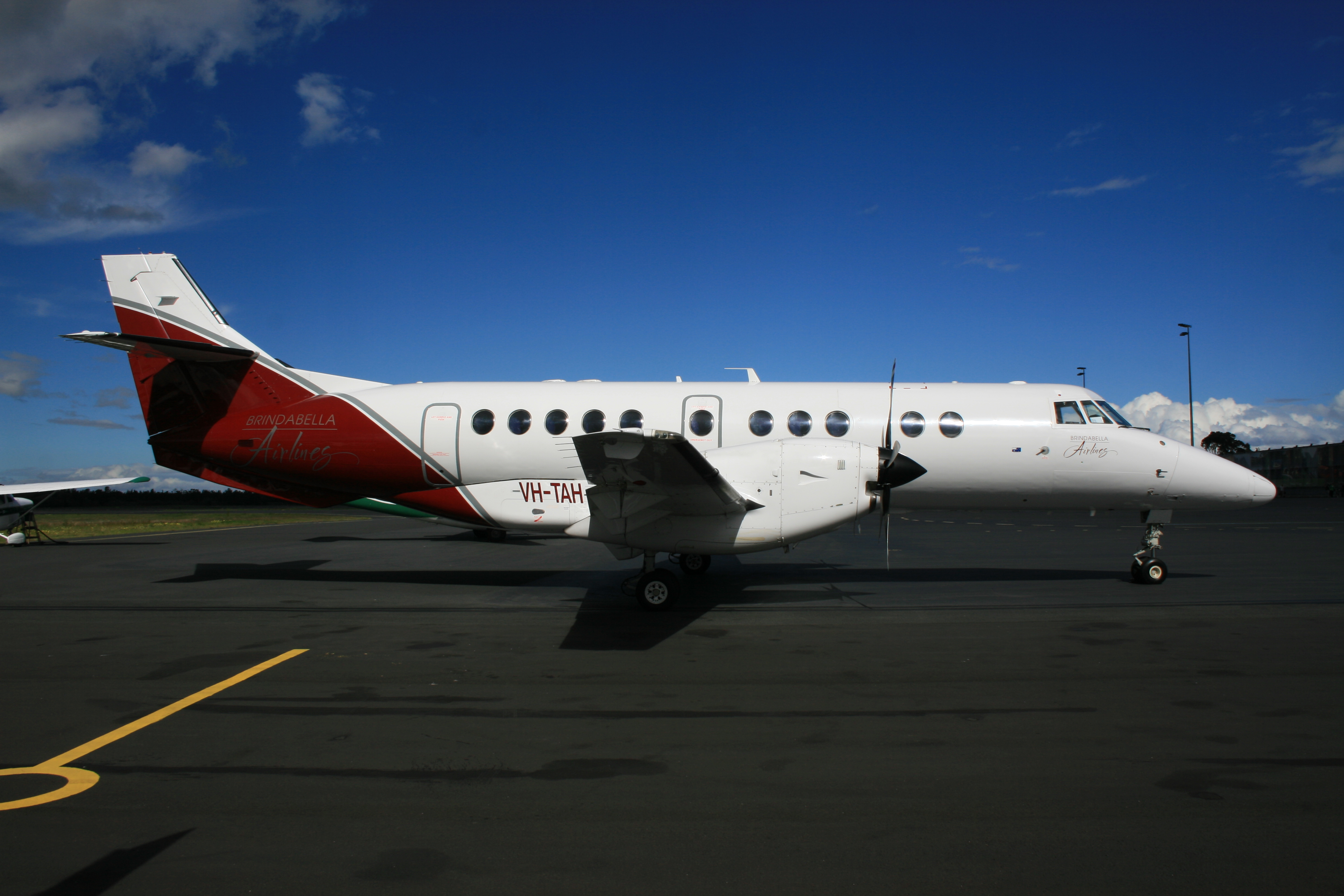
Brindabella Airlines British Aerospace Jetstream 41

Brindabella Airlines operated services to Brisbane, Canberra, Cobar, Coffs Harbour, Cooma, Moree, Mudgee, Narrabri, Newcastle, Orange, Sydney and Tamworth

Mining charter flights operated from Brisbane to Emerald and Townsville. A new service from Canberra to Latrobe Valley Airport commenced on 5 September 2005. This service primarily catered for public servants travelling between the national capital and the Australian Securities & Investments Commission centre in Traralgon. It was suspended in May 2006 due to low load factors reportedly costing the airline over $200,000.

In August 2006, Sunshine Express Airlines and Brindabella Airlines announced that an agreement had been reached for Brindabella to take over the New South Wales coastal routes then operated by Sunshine Express. On 1 October 2006 Brindabella commenced regular passenger transport operations to Port Macquarie, Coffs Harbour and Brisbane, utilising the same equipment and staff previously provided by Sunshine Express. In April 2008, the airline announced the introduction of a week-day direct air service between Tamworth and Brisbane. A weekend service was added shortly after. In July 2010 Brindabella introduced a new Brisbane to Moree service.

On 28 May 2012, Brindabella Airlines announced it would discontinue its daily Brisbane and Armidale flight, and its Canberra to Albury service, blaming both the Federal Government's Clean Energy Bill (better known as the carbon tax) and loss of the 'en-route rebate scheme.' On 15 November 2012 Transport for NSW awarded a five-year license for the Sydney to Moree route serviced by a BAe Jetstream 41.

== Fleet ==
As of December 2013, the fleet consisted of:

- 3 British Aerospace Jetstream 32
- 4 British Aerospace Jetstream 41
- 5 Fairchild SA227-AC Metro III
