= Caves Beach =

- Suburb
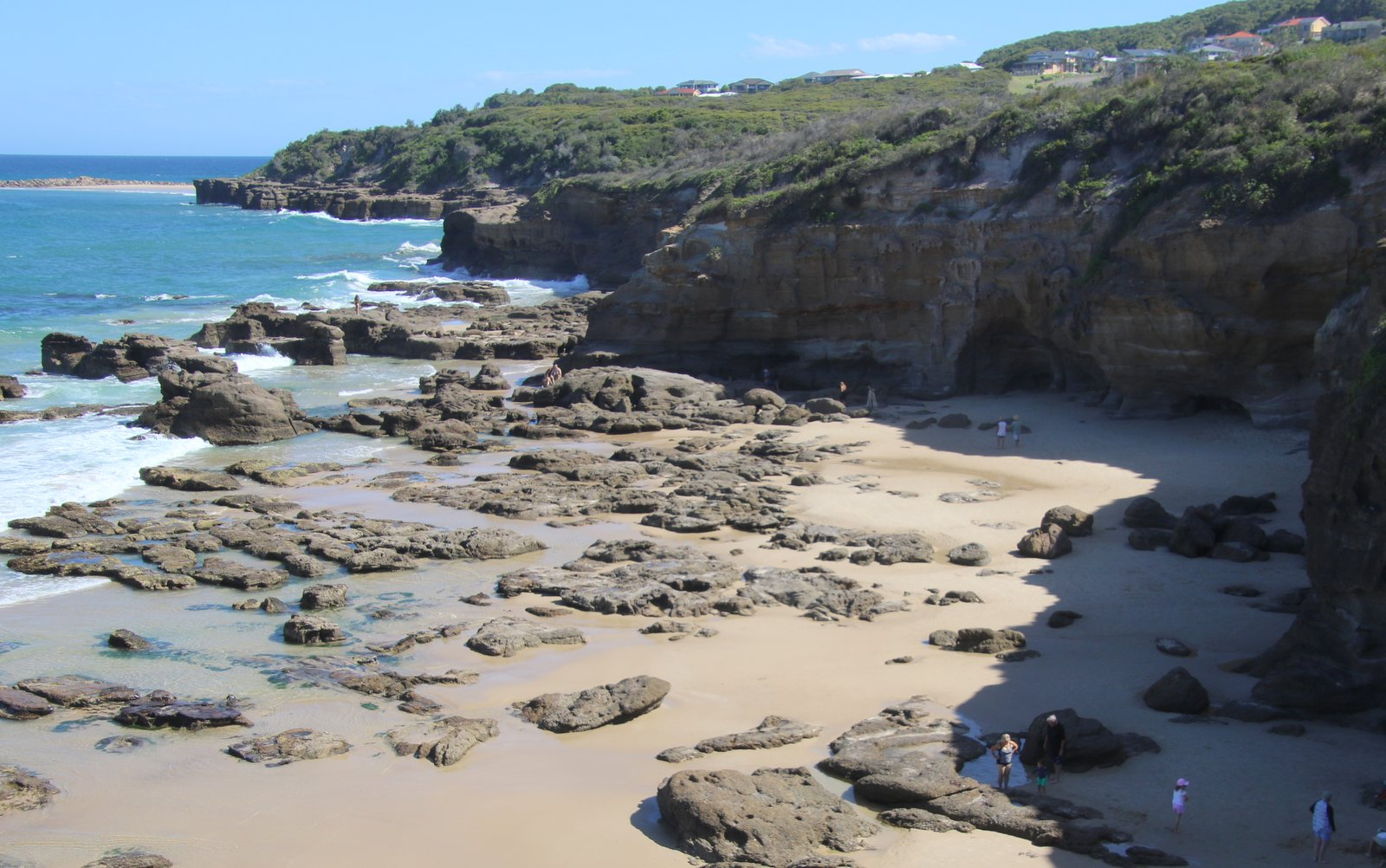

- Coordinates: 33°06′54″S 151°39′04″E
- Country: Australia
- State: New South Wales
- City: Greater Newcastle
- LGA: City of Lake Macquarie
- Location: 2 km (1.2 mi) SE of Swansea
- Established: 1829

Government
  - State electorate: Swansea
  - Federal division: Shortland

Area
  - Total: 43 km^{2} (17 sq mi)

Population
  - Total: 4,016 (2021 census)
  - Density: 93.4/km^{2} (241.9/sq mi)
- Postcode: 2281
- Parish: Wallarah
Suburbs around Caves Beach
Swansea	Swansea	Swansea Heads
Pinny Beach	Caves Beach	Pacific Ocean
Pinny Beach	Pinny Beach	Pacific Ocean

Caves Beach is a locality on the Swansea peninsula between Lake Macquarie and the Pacific Ocean in Greater Newcastle, New South Wales, Australia. It is part of the City of Lake Macquarie local government area. The locality is named for the large number of caves on the nearby coastline. It has a surfing beach which is popular with the local surfers. It is highly popular for spearfishing, with the premier target species being the elusive red morwong. The traditional custodians of the land are the Awabakal people.

Local businesses include a resort, restaurants, convenient stores, IGA, Cafés, butchers, gelato store.

== Geography ==
Caves Beach approximately covers 43 km2 (16.6 sq mi). The west side of the suburb is mainly all residential. To the east, there are more shops, cafes and restaurants. To the far east is the beach.

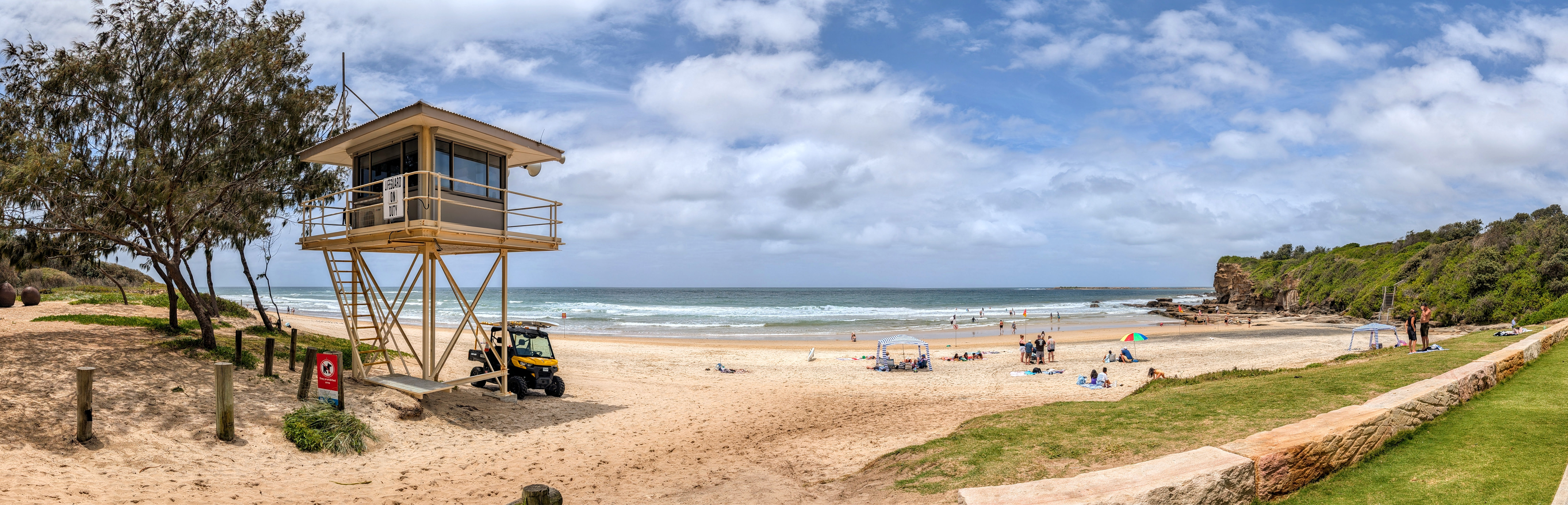
Panoramic view of the beach, with caves at right, lifeguard stand at left

To the north is Swansea Heads and Ham's Beach, named after a family living on a hill behind the surf lifesaving club. The rocky section of Ham's is dubbed Frenchie's Beach by the locals. To the south is Pinny's Beach.

== History ==
=== Aboriginal occupation ===
The plains were covered with grass trees and the Awabakal people went there to collect the resin, used in spear-making. There were campsites at Ham's beach because of the good fishing and availability of a fine-grained quartzite for making stone implements.

=== Early European years ===
Originally, Caves Beach was known as The Plains. After the name was changed to Plains Beach and then Caves Beach. In 1960 it was named Mawson but the community objected and the name Caves Beach was restored in 1965.

=== 19th century ===
The Swansea–Caves Beach Surf Life Saving Club was founded in 1929 by a group of men from Swansea wanting to establish a surf lifesaving club between Swansea Heads and Pinny Beach.

Early surveying for land grants occurred in 1864, and early subdivisions in 1935. in the 1940s Mr. Mawson initiated the development of Caves Beach. At one stage he involved a Japanese consortium in a mining venture called Silver Valley Minerals but it failed to develop. The breakwater at Spoon Rocks, constructed to load coal into ships, remains from this venture.

In 1958 plans were approved for a new hotel on Caves Beach Rd called The Mawson. The pub was famous and very popular throughout the 60s and 70s and attracted the attention of bands such as Midnight Oil, Cold Chisel and The Angels, who performed there. The hotel was beloved by the locals but the Mawsons eventually sold the hotel for a reported $1.2 million on 9 October 1981. In 2018 a restaurant called Mawson opened up, with the name being an obvious reminder of the old hotel.

Swansea High School opened at Caves Beach in 1964 and Caves Beach Public School was opened in 1968 beside the high school.

== Population ==
According to the 2016 census of population, there were 4,054 people in Caves Beach.

- Aboriginal and Torres Strait Islander people made up 2.6% of the population.
- 86.5% of people were born in Australia. The next most common country of birth was England at 3.7%.
- 94.5% of people only spoke English at home.
- The most common responses for religion were no religion 28.4%, Catholic 23.2% and Anglican 21.5%.
