= Airborne Sting =

Sting

General information
- Type: Hang glider
- National origin: Australia
- Manufacturer: Airborne Windsports
- Status: In production

The Airborne Sting is a series of Australian high-wing, single-seat hang gliders, designed and produced by Airborne Windsports of Redhead, New South Wales and introduced in the early 2000s.

== Design and development ==
The Stings are intended to be intermediate hang gliders used for recreational flying. They all feature ease of handling with good performance

The Sting 2 154 XC model is made from 7075 aluminum tubing, with the semi-double-surface wing covered in Dacron sailcloth. Its 9.09 m (29.8 ft) span wing is cable braced with a single kingpost supporting the ground wires. The nose angle is 121° and the aspect ratio is 5.7:1. The aircraft is certified as DHV 1–2.

== Variants ==
Sting 2 118
Very small sized single-seat model with 11.0 m^{2} (118 sq ft) wing area for very light pilots or those wishing a higher wing loading
Sting 2 140 X
Small sized single-seat model with 13.03 m^{2} (140.3 sq ft) wing area, 8.45 m (27.7 ft) wing span, a pilot hook-in weight range of 45 to 85 kg (99 to 187 lb) and a wing aspect ratio of 5.5:1
Sting 2 154 XC
Medium sized single-seat model with 14.33 m^{2} (154.2 sq ft) wing area, 9.09 m (29.8 ft) wing span, a pilot hook-in weight range of 55 to 110 kg (121 to 243 lb) and a wing aspect ratio of 5.7:1
Sting 175 XC
Large sized single-seat model with 16.3 m^{2} (175 sq ft) wing area, 9.8 m (32.2 ft) wing span, a pilot hook-in weight range of 80 to 135 kg (176 to 298 lb) and a wing aspect ratio of 5.9:1
Sting 3 154
Improved medium sized single-seat model with 14.33 m^{2} (154.2 sq ft) wing area, 9.1 m (29.9 ft) wing span, a pilot hook-in weight range of 55 to 110 kg (121 to 243 lb) and a wing aspect ratio of 5.7:1
Sting 3 168
Improved large sized single-seat model with 15.6 m^{2} (168 sq ft) wing area, 9.5 m (31.2 ft) wing span, a pilot hook-in weight range of 80 to 120 kg (180 to 260 lb) and a wing aspect ratio of 5.7:1

== Specifications (Sting 2 175 XC) ==
Data from Bertrand

General characteristics

- Crew: one
- Wingspan: 9.8 m (32 ft 2 in)
- Wing area: 16.3 m^{2} (175 sq ft)
- Aspect ratio: 5.9:1
