= Westpac Lifesaver Rescue Helicopter Service =

Helicopter rescue service in Australia

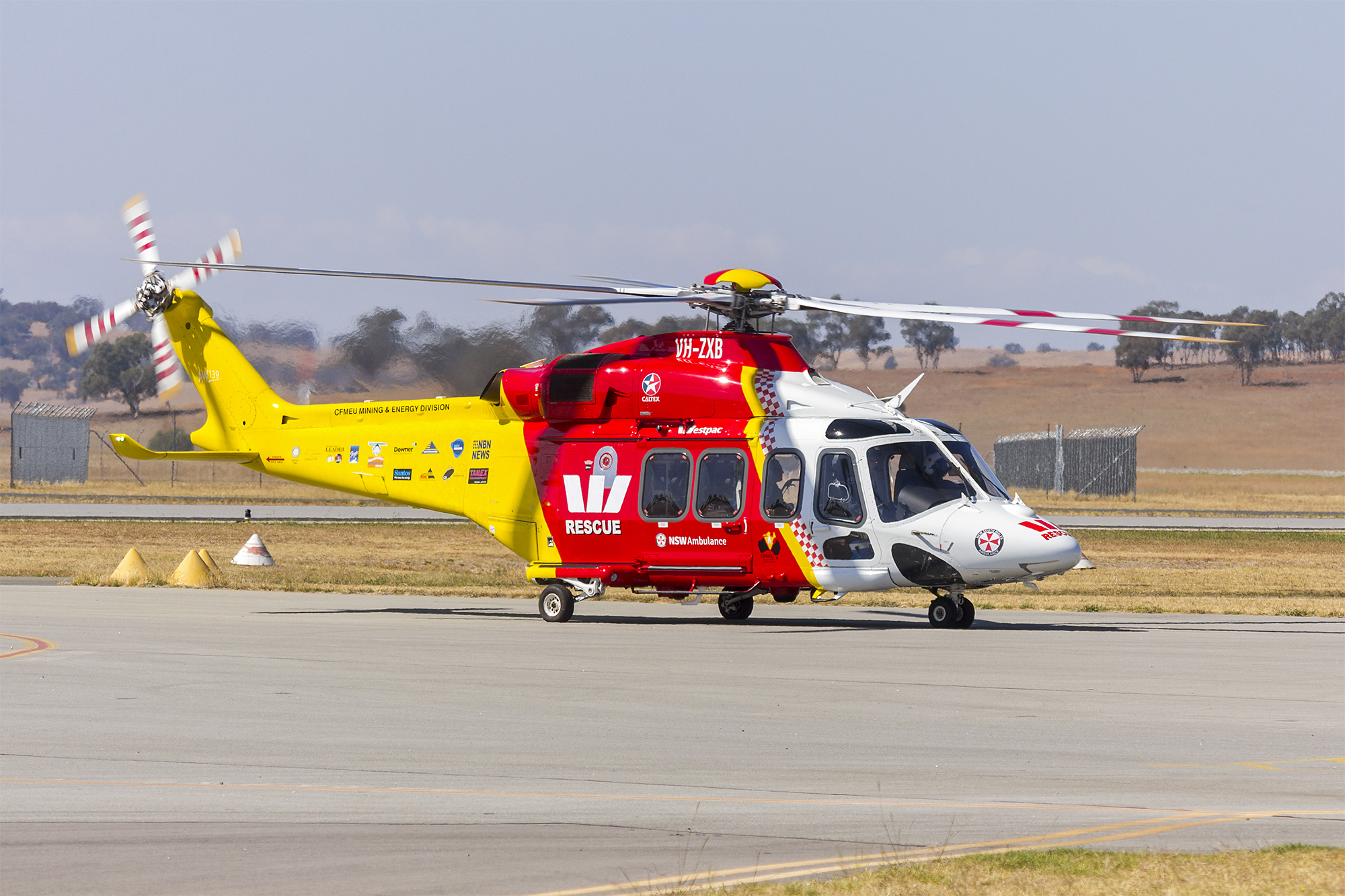
- Formation: 1973
- Parent organization: Surf Life Saving Australia
- Subsidiaries: Helicopter Rescue Service Limited

The Westpac Lifesaver Rescue Helicopter Service is a helicopter surf lifesaving service that operates in Australia.

Founded in 1973 by Surf Life Saving Australia, a not-for-profit organisation, the service has carried out more than 80,000 flights ranging from aeromedical to search and rescue missions. The Westpac Life Saver Rescue Helicopter Service is the largest non-profit search and rescue and aeromedical retrieval service in Australia. Its aircraft and trained medical and operational crews respond quickly and effectively to emergencies threatening the life, health and safety of people caused through medical emergency, illness, natural disaster, accidents or mishap.

The naming rights sponsor of the helicopter services is Westpac, an Australian-based financial institution that also has operations in New Zealand.

== Role ==
When contracted, the Westpac Life Saver Rescue Helicopters respond to medical emergencies throughout the most populous regions of Australia, covering hundreds of thousands of square kilometres of bushland, mountain ranges, highways as well as the coastlines of New South Wales, Queensland, South Australia, Tasmania, Victoria and Western Australia.

The helicopters are tasked to undertake a number of different missions:

- Search and rescue missions: tasked to locate a distress beacon activated such as; from a downed aircraft or vessel out at sea.
- Coastal Surveillance: Routine and tasked patrolling along coastal shores including; shark spotting, rescue, hazard identification.
- Primary missions: tasked to an industrial, recreational, motor vehicle accident or natural disaster to deliver their medical expertise and provide life saving support.
- Secondary missions: tasked to transport a patient from a country hospital to a metropolitan hospital for specialist care.
- Recovery missions: tasked to recover a body from an inaccessible area.
- Inter-agency Operations: Providing support to other emergency services and governments, such as police, fire, ambulance, SES, and AMSA.

== Organisational structure ==
While the service operates under the umbrella name of Westpac Lifesaver Rescue Helicopter Service, autonomous, yet affiliated, non-profit organisations deliver the service to meet the specific needs of local communities. Each organisation is governed by a Board with local management and an advisory committee. The relevant organisations are:

- NSW - Greater Sydney
- NSW - Northern NSW
- Qld - Westpac Lifesaver Rescue Helicopter Service
- SA - Westpac Lifesaver Rescue Helicopter
- Tas - Westpac Lifesaver Rescue Helicopter
- Vic – Westpac Rescue Helicopter
- WA - Westpac Lifesaver Rescue Helicopter

== Operations ==
The Westpac Life Saver Rescue Helicopter Service operates in six states in Australia. The Northern NSW and Tasmania Service is contracted to fly helicopters with on-board specialist doctors and paramedics.

In New South Wales, there are five operation bases and a total of six rescue aircraft. Westpac 1, 2, 3, 4 are spread across 3 bases; Lake Macquarie Airport Newcastle, Tamworth Airport, Lismore Airport. The 4 aircraft rotate between these bases covering Newcastle/Hunter to South East Queensland. In Sydney, Lifesaver 21 is based; Lifesaver 23 is based in Moruya both aircraft are operated by Helistar. With support of major sponsor, Westpac, Greater Sydney opened a summer-time base at Moruya Airport in December 2010 for three months. A total of 67 missions were achieved in the first season. The previous Labor Government provided funding for Sydney to return to all-hours operations (from 1 October 2011) and the south coast service would become a year-round, day-time operation (from 1 December 2011). Southern now operates two bases covering from the Central Coast to the Victorian border.

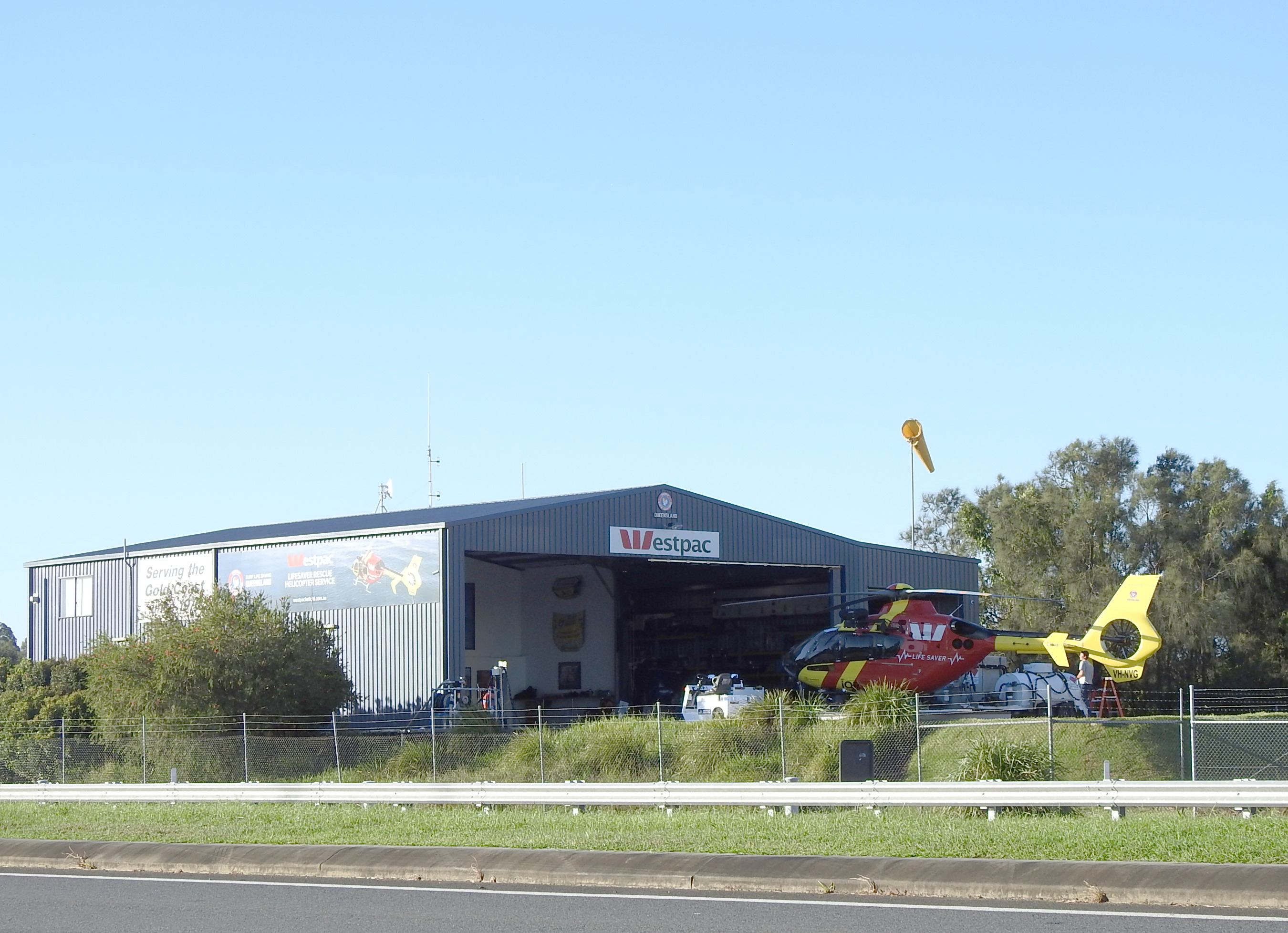
Rescue facility, Carrara, Gold Coast, Queensland (2021).

In Queensland, the Service patrols the southeast coast, performing beach patrols, search & rescue, shark sightings and warnings and provides assistance to Surf Lifesavers in the water and on the beach, utilising VH-NVG, a Eurocopter EC135 P2+, and VH-SLQ, also an EC135 P2+. The service also operates two helicopters on behalf of Queensland Police (VH-NVF and VH-POF), both EC-135s. In 2020 former Westpac-branded helicopter VH-NVF was removed from service to be transitioned to operate as Polair, and was replaced by VH-SLQ. In late 2021 Surf Lifesaving Queensland took delivery of former PolAir 4 from NSW Police (VH-POF) for modernisation of the current QPS Polair fleet towards a Eurocopter EC135 P2 operation. NVG and SLQ are switched between Lifesaver 45 and Lifesaver 46 depending on operational requirements and engine hours. The Service formerly operated 3 MBB Bo 105s as Polair 1-3. SLSQ now operates 3 Bell429's on contract for Queensland Police.

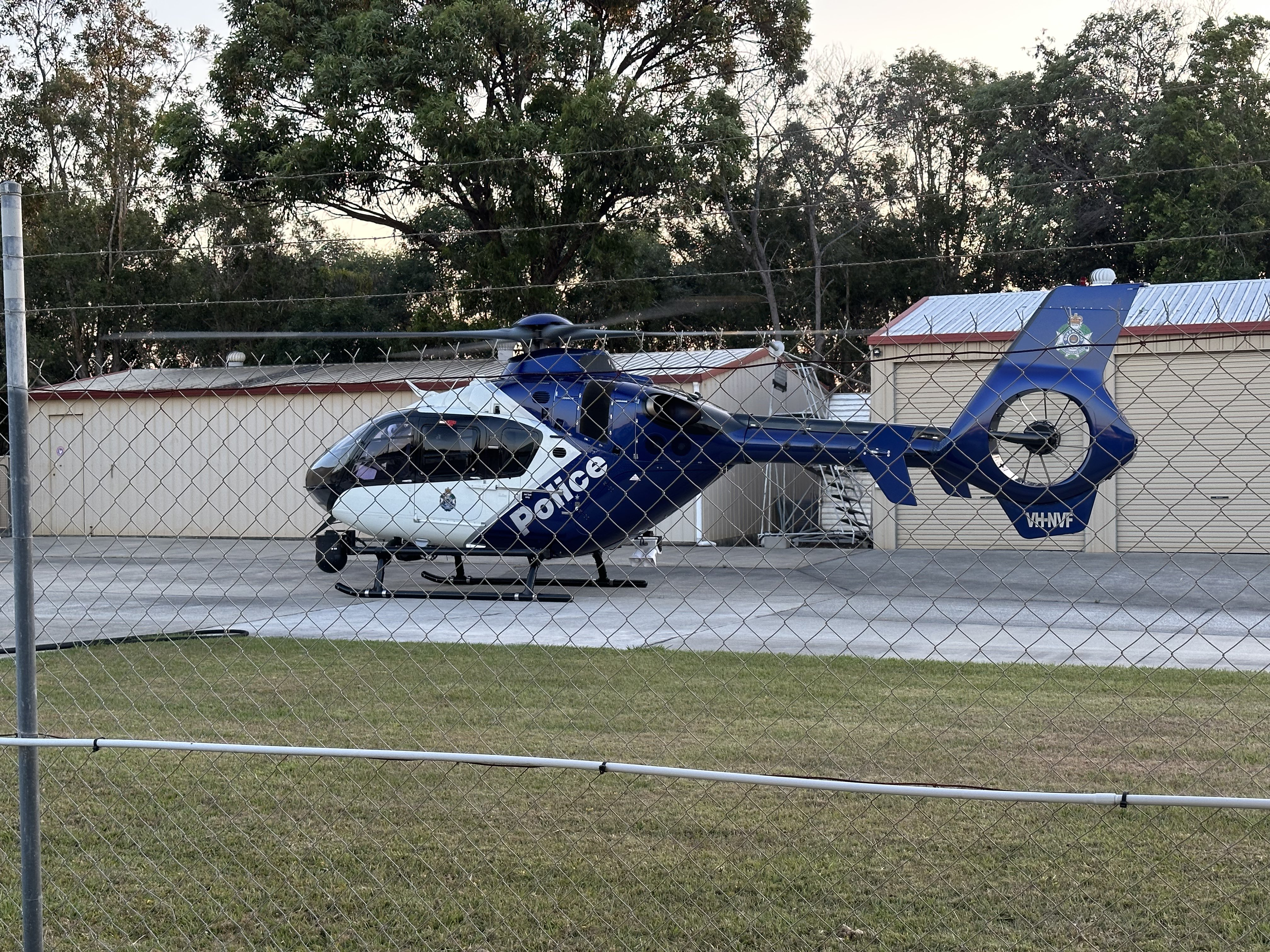
One of two EC135s (VH-NVF) operating on behalf of the Queensland Police Service, refuelling at Caloundra Base.

In Victoria, the Westpac Life Saver Rescue Helicopter provides an aerial surveillance service, which currently consists of Lifesaver 30 and Lifesaver 31. The Westpac Lifesaver Rescue Helicopter conducts regular patrols and undertakes rescue missions across Victoria. The service works closely with the volunteer beach patrols, paid lifeguards, and offshore services, and is readily available to assist other emergency services and government agencies. The service undertakes community education and promotional activities throughout the year and will be available all hours for call-outs. Life Saving Victoria also works closely with the police air-wing and marine rescue units which enables the fastest response to emergency calls.

In Tasmania, the Service provides emergency services and has a contract with Ambulance Tasmania as well as the Tasmanian Police.

In South Australia, Service helicopters patrol beaches on weekends, public holidays and busy weekdays over summer from November through to March each year. Its patrolling region is the Adelaide mid-south coastline from North Haven to Normanville, and the South Coast from Parsons Beach to the Murray Mouth, including Victor Harbor, Port Elliot, Middleton and Goolwa. It works together with other Surf Lifesaving support services, including Lifesaver 2 and Lifesaver 3, the state Jet Rescue Boats.

The Service launched operations in Western Australia in December 2008 at Rous Head, Fremantle with patrols beaches on weekends, public holidays and busy weekdays over the summer months. It now operates two helicopters: Perth Metropolitan Service and South West Service. The Perth Metropolitan Service patrols from Mandurah to Yanchep and out to Rottnest Island. The Perth Service operates on weekends in September and daily from October to April. The South West Service started in 2013 at Busselton Regional Airport and patrols the areas between Bunbury and Hamelin Bay. It is operational from September to April on Weekends, public holidays and school holidays.

=== Flight crew ===
Search and rescue (SAR) and surveillance: The flight crew usually consists of one pilot (or two pilots on varying aircraft), one air crew officer, and one rescue swimmer. The crews consist of both paid and volunteer positions.

Aeromedical: Besides pilots, there are several specialist crew members. The air crewman assists the pilot with communication; navigation; and landing by providing the pilot with accurate clearance; helicopter safety; and operating the rescue winch. A rescue crewman's duties include going down the winch, scaling cliff faces, and swimming. Rescue crew are also responsible for passenger safety during Passenger Transport Operations. Special Casualty Access Team (SCAT) paramedics possess skills in intensive care/Advance Life Support (ALS) and trauma management; and have skills in accessing and treating patients in difficult or remote locations. SCATs work closely with the local accredited rescue units to access, assess, triage, and treat patients. When required, SCATs may also provide assistance with the extrication of the patient. They provide patient care and are responsible for preparing the aeromedical evacuation missions, coordinating with the flight crew and other medical personnel, as well as liaising with retrieval services. Doctors specially qualified in Emergency Care and retrieval medicine are also part of the team. This enables the crew to provide critical care to patients anywhere it is needed.

=== Aircraft ===
The following aircraft, bases and coverage summarise the activities of the Service:

Newcastle, Lismore, Tamworth are part of the Westpac operations but fall under the name Westpac Northern Region Rescue Helicopter service. They operate 24/7 using 5 AgustaWestland AW139.

The Sydney and South Coast operation replaced the 2 existing MBB/Kawasaki BK 117 with new upgraded versions operated by Helistar during 2020.

The Victoria service saw the addition of Lifesaver 31 in the 2020/21 season, as a dedicated surveillance aircraft equipped with high definition cameras and a FLIR device.

The Queensland Sunshine Coast Helicopter VH-NVH, a MBB Bo 105 was removed from service July 2020 for transition to Queensland Police operations (Polair), replaced by VH-NVF, a Eurocopter EC135 P2. NVH has since been retired from SLSQ entirely, with NVF transitioning to Police operations, replaced by VH-NVG

==== Currently in use ====
State	Regions served	Call sign	Aircraft type	Base	Notes
Northern NSW Structure	Newcastle, New South Wales Tamworth, New South Wales Lismore, New South Wales	Westpac 1 Westpac 2 Westpac 3 Westpac 4 Westpac 5	AgustaWestland AW139	Lake Macquarie Airport Tamworth Regional Airport Lismore Airport	
New South Wales	Greater Metropolitan Sydney	Lifesaver 21	BK-117	La Perouse, Botany Bay National Park	
New South Wales	South Coast	Lifesaver 23	BK-117	Moruya Airport	
Queensland	Gold Coast	Lifesaver 45	Eurocopter EC135 P2	Carrara	
Queensland	Sunshine Coast	Lifesaver 46	Eurocopter EC135 P2	Caloundra Airport	
South Australia		Westpac 501	Eurocopter AS355 Écureuil 2	Adelaide Airport	
Tasmania		Polair 71	Kawasaki BK117	Hobart Airport	
Tasmania		Polair 72	Kawasaki BK117	Hobart Airport	
Tasmania		Polair 73	Kawasaki BK117	Hobart Airport	
Victoria		Lifesaver 30	Eurocopter EC135P2+	Barwon Heads Airport, Geelong	
Victoria		Lifesaver 31	Eurocopter EC120	Barwon Heads Airport, Geelong	
Western Australia	Perth	Lifesaver 68	Eurocopter AS350 Écureuil	Rous Head, Fremantle	
Western Australia	South-West	Lifesaver 69	Eurocopter AS350 Écureuil	Busselton Margaret River Airport	

==== Formerly operated ====
- Eurocopter AS365 Dauphin
- MBB/Kawasaki BK 117
- Cessna 337G Super Skymaster
- Bell 412
- MBB Bo 105
- Bell 206 Long Ranger
- Bell 407

=== Helicopter emergency medical service in New South Wales ===
Since the 1970s helicopters have been part of the fleet of NSW Ambulance. The SLSA-owned Westpac Life Saver Rescue Helicopter Service (WLSRHS) started receiving NSW Government funding for its service in 1978; with funding and tasking arrangements put in place in 1989. By 2006 there were nine helicopters operating across the state. Reviews commissioned by NSW Ambulance during 2004 and 2005 identified a number of systemic weaknesses with the services provided by both the WLSHRS and by CareFlight, delivered under a mix of government funding, corporate sponsorship and fundraising. During 2006, a competitive tenders process commenced to provide helicopters in Greater Sydney, which covers the Sydney, Wollongong and Orange areas, as well as other locations across NSW. In December 2006, John Hatzistergos, the NSW Minister for Health, announced the government's decision to award a contract for the Greater Sydney area to Canadian Helicopter Corporation (CHC), which was already providing a service in Wollongong and Canberra, for commencement from May 2007; effectively terminating the contracts for the Greater Sydney area held by WLSHRS and CareFlight. No interstate operations were affected by the change in contract. A summary of the outcome of the competitive tendering process is set out below:

Helicopter emergency medical service providers in NSW
Location	Provider (pre-May 2007)	Provider (June 2007 – May 2014)	Provider (December 2014 – present)
Sydney (NETS)	Childflight		CareFlight
Sydney	SLSA (WLSHRS)		
Sydney	SLSA (WLSHRS)	CHC	Toll Ambulance Rescue Helicopter Service
Sydney	CareFlight		Toll Ambulance Rescue Helicopter Service
Wollongong	SLSA (WLSHRS), sub-contracted to CHC 2005–2007	CHC	Toll Ambulance Rescue Helicopter Service
Orange	CareFlight	CHC	Toll Ambulance Rescue Helicopter Service
Newcastle	SLSA (WLSHRS)		Westpac Northern Region Helicopter Rescue Service
Tamworth	SLSA (WLSHRS)		Westpac Northern Region Helicopter Rescue Service
Lismore	SLSA (WLSHRS)		Westpac Northern Region Helicopter Rescue Service
Canberra	SouthCare		SouthCare (using Toll aircraft)
Moruya	SLSA (WLSHRS)		
Source:Performance Audit: Helicopter Emergency Medical Service Contract (2010), p. 8.			Source:

The decision to appoint a for profit corporation to deliver the service, in lieu of not-profit entities, drew considerable media, community, and political attention. As a result, the NSW Auditor-General was instructed to deliver a performance audit of the helicopter emergency medical services contract process and whether satisfactory outcomes for Greater Sydney were delivered under awarding the contract to CHC. Reporting in 2010, he found that:

"...the contract process was satisfactory. Ambulance data show that the performance of CHC is meeting contract requirements with the exception of the availability of the Wollongong helicopter. [NSW] Ambulance [Service]'s ability to transport patients to the right hospital at the right time has improved. However the cost of the new Greater Sydney helicopter contract is three times higher than before."

— Peter Achterstraat, Auditor-General of New South Wales

Ahead of the publication of the Auditor-General's report, it was reported in December 2009 that CHC were seeking to sell its Australian air services arm, following a series of mishaps including engine failures, windows falling out of the aircraft, no installed air conditioning system inside the cabin as well as response delays to accident sites.

In 2011, Jillian Skinner, the NSW Minister for Health, commissioned a strategic review of the NSW Ambulance Service, including its aeromedical operations. Ernst & Young were engaged to assist with the review; and delivered a final report with 56 recommendations that were released for public comment from December 2012 to mid March 2013. Following consideration of the 73 submissions received, and further consultation with clinical and aviation experts, in 2013 the NSW Government released the Reform Plan for Aeromedical (Rotary Wing) Retrieval Services in NSW. Along with other reforms, two key issues impact the ongoing operations of the WLSHRS:

1. The helicopter retrieval fleet will be standardised to two types of helicopters for the State, and new helicopters will be phased in as part of the procurement and implementation process for longer contract terms of between 7 – 10 years;
2. NSW Health will structure helicopter contracts around two regions within NSW so that each region has one operator, including options for consortia arrangements.

In December 2014, it was announced that the partnership of the Northern Region SLSA and the Hunter Region SLSA had been successful in the NSW Aeromedical Retrieval Network tender. As a result, the service would re-equip with AgustaWestland AW139 helicopters from early 2017 to be operated from bases the existing base in Tamworth as well as upgraded bases in Lismore and Newcastle

The first of four AgustaWestland AW139 arrived at the Newcastle Westpac Rescue base on 10 June 2016.

== See also ==
- June 2007 Hunter Region and Central Coast storms
- MV Pasha Bulker
- Auckland Rescue Helicopter Trust
- Piha Surf Life Saving Club
