= Murrays Beach, New South Wales =

Murrays Beach
- Suburb
- Coordinates: 33°07′06″S 151°37′01″E
- Country: Australia
- State: New South Wales
- LGA: City of Lake Macquarie
- Location: 26 km (16 mi) SW of Newcastle; 91 km (57 mi) NE of Sydney
- Established: 2006

Government
  - State electorate: Swansea
  - Federal division: Shortland

Area
  - Total: 2.5 km^{2} (0.97 sq mi)

Population
  - Total: 882 (2021 census)
  - Density: 353/km^{2} (914/sq mi)
- Postcode: 2281
- Parish: Wallarah
Suburbs around Murrays Beach
Lake Macquarie	Swansea	Pinny Beach
Lake Macquarie	Murrays Beach	Pinny Beach
Cams Wharf	Catherine Hill Bay	Pinny Beach

Murrays Beach is a suburb of the City of Lake Macquarie. It is located on the Wallarah Peninsula and is to the east of Lake Macquarie. It is part of the City of Lake Macquarie local government area.

== History ==
Murrays Beach was named after David and Patrick Murray, the owners of a coal-mine in the 1860s that pre-dated the settlement. The suburb of Murrays Beach was gazetted on 5 May 2006 and developed into an eco-friendly suburb by Stockland.
