= No. 208 Radar Station RAAF =

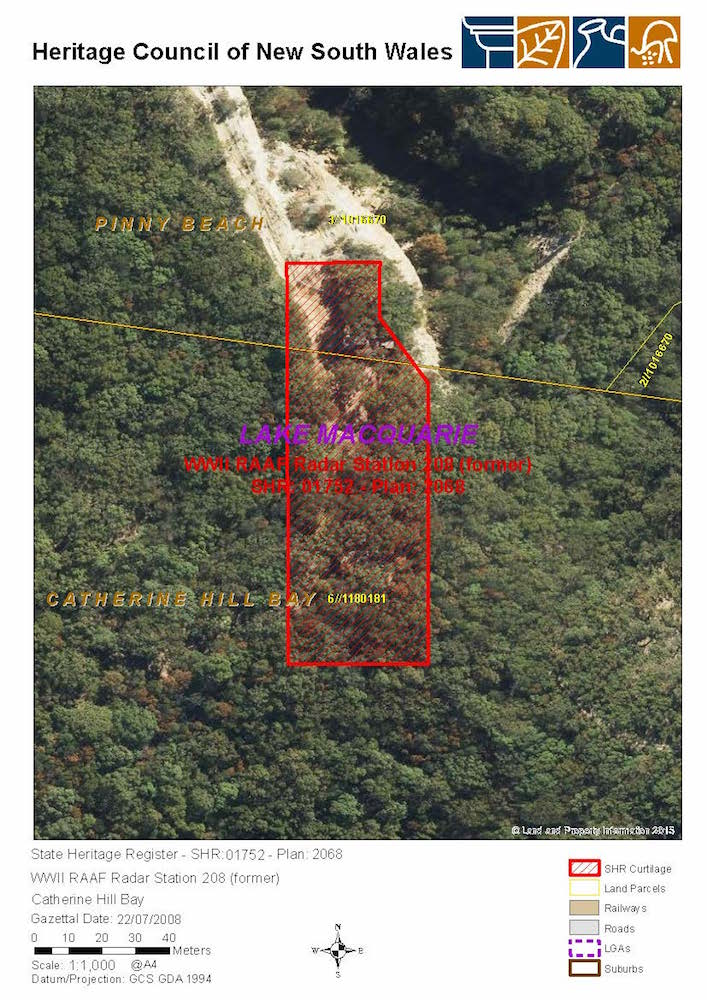
- Heritage boundaries

- Location within New South Wales Location within Australia
- 33.1336°S 151.6358°E
- Location: Catherine Hill Bay, City of Lake Macquarie, New South Wales, Australia

History
- Built: 1942–1943

New South Wales Heritage Register
- Official name: WWII RAAF Radar Station 208 (former); Mine Camp; Signal Hill; Radar Hill
- Type: state heritage (built)
- Designated: 22 July 2008
- Reference no.: 1752
- Type: Defence Radar Station
- Category: Defence
- Builders: Allied Works Council

No. 208 Radar Station RAAF is a heritage-listed former Royal Australian Air Force (RAAF) radar station at Mine Camp at Catherine Hill Bay and Pinny Beach, both in City of Lake Macquarie, New South Wales, Australia. It was established on 10 February 1943. The remains of the radar station were added to the New South Wales State Heritage Register on 22 July 2008.

== History ==
The radar station was built by the Allied Works Council to monitor enemy airborne threats during World War II. It was one of nine Advanced Chain Overseas (ACO) radar installations on mainland Australia. The War Cabinet had originally intended to have 32 units to implement the plan for Australia's radar station chain, but this became difficult to achieve and later unnecessary after significant events that changed the course of the war. The ACO radar equipment sent to Australia was originally intended for other territories such as Malaya and Singapore but diverted after Japanese invasion of these countries.

Radar Station 208 was sited on a ridge 93m above sea level amongst dense woodland overlooking the ocean. The transmitter and receiver towers were over 44 metres in height and spaced 100metres apart to ensure that radio pulses were received as echoes and not confused with transmissions. The floodlight system of the ACO radars required a high volume of electrical power sourced from power mains with backup generator located in a smaller dedicated bunker. Bombproof bunkers, meant to be underground, housed the electronics for transmitter and receiver, each console weighing two tonnes.

According to RAAF records, "No. 208 RDF Station formed to establishment No. HD 318 of Mine Camp, NSW on 10th February 1943 under the control of H.Q. Eastern Area. The purpose of the unit is, by means of Radio Direction Finding to locate and promulgate advice of enemy and other aircraft approaching to locality of the station".

At its establishment it had a total of 41 personnel consisting of 1 RAAF Officer, 1 WAAAF Officer, 14 RAAF and 25 WAAAF, the personnel levels peaked in May 1943 with a total of 54. The radar Operators were from the Women's Auxiliary Australian Air Force (WAAAF). The radar mechanics were from the Royal Australian Air Force. The unit also included guards, cooks and other trades. The Operators communicated plotted data to the Fighter Unit in Newcastle by land line or radio telephone.

The radar operator monitored aircraft activity from an eleven-inch cathode ray tube screen. Using the goniometer consisting of switches and controls of the direction and height finding components, the operator would alter the screen and make comparisons to decipher the direction, elevation and distance of the aircraft. The radar mechanics were required to regularly climb the radar towers to service relay switches and aerials.

The ACO, a fixed radar station, had some advantages over others with its quick height finding capabilities and ability to monitor aircraft movements up to 200 miles. The radar station also served RAAF Base Rathmines, monitoring movements of Catalinas and other aircraft. Plotted data was communicated to the command centre, Fighter Station No 2 located 26 km north of the installation.

In August 1944 No. 208 Radar Station RAAF ceased to be a 24-hour operation and personnel numbers were steadily reduced until 28 January 1947 when it was disbanded.

=== Associated sites - Mine Camp ===
RAAF and WAAAF personnel of Radar Station 208 were stationed at a small township near Catherine Hill Bay below the radar station, which once served as a camp during the early mining period. The first shipment of coal from the area was made in 1873 by the New Wallsend Coal Company. Initially a shanty town served the miners but by the 1870s a miners settlement was established boasting 20 houses. The arrival of forty five WAAAF and RAAF personnel doubled the townships population which had one shop and a post office. Additional living quarters were erected for personnel that imitated the existing housing within the township for camouflage purposes.

Some civilians remained at Mine Camp village and, soon after the war, the Housing Commission of New South Wales acquired the RAAF property, yet numbers declined and the post office closed in 1952. In 1969 twelve dwellings remained. In 1969 twelve dwellings remained and soon after the Housing Commission of New South Wales acquired the property. In the 1980s the village was destroyed by bush fire.

=== Commanding officers ===
- A.J. Ryan (FlgOff) – 10 January 1943
- A.G.L. Price (FlgOff) – 2 June 1943
- R.S. Coggins (PltOff) – 16 September 1943
- S.E. Stead (SectOff) – 1 September 1944
- W.C. Hammer (FltLt) – 6 October 1944
- R.S. Pearce (FlgOff) – 6 April 1945
- E.M. Robertson (SectOff) – 14 July 1945
- E.S. Padman (FltLt) – 10 September 1945
- J.W. Harris (FltLt) – 15 November 1945
- B.F. Gallagher (FlgOff) – 24 January 1946
- W.S. Mattick (Sgt) – 5 February 1946

== Description ==
The former Radar Station 208 site has a north and south arrangement with principal structures replicated in each sector. There are two arrangements of four concrete footings that originally supported 44 metre timber aerial towers. The footings are arranged in a square pattern with remnant steel supports protruding from each block. Two concrete above ground igloo shaped bunkers remain, each with a square turret on the seaward side. The footings and bunkers are symmetrically placed across an east–west axis. The bunkers have remnants of electrical fittings and recessed areas on the internal walls and concrete slab floors and an egress on the eastern walls. The southern area has a remnant rectangular shaped concrete support for the tower ladder rising several centimetres above the ground surface. The northern area has a remnant concrete stair structure of approximately half a metre high with three steps and the outer rim concrete remains of a depressed circular structure.

A two-metre safety fence, erected in the 1990s, is located on the northern and eastern boundary and isolates the footings and other above surface remains in the northern section. The eastern side of the northern bunker is one and a half metres from the cliff edge.

The southern sector arrangement of footings was reported to be well preserved and obscured by dense regrowth vegetation as at 7 February 2006. The northern sector footings were reported to show a greater level of deterioration with exposure to coastal conditions.

The concrete bunkers have been subject to graffiti and fire but remain in good condition. There is some evidence of concrete cancer to the buildings in the form of exposed reinforcing where minor concrete spalling has occurred.

== Heritage listing ==
The former RAAF Radar Station 208 at Catherine Hill Bay, comprising remains of the RAAF radar installation is significant as a rare example of NSW's participation in the WWII network of air warning radar, established in strategic locations along Australia's coast during World War II. It is one of nine ACO radar stations established on mainland Australia using British imported ACO radar and the only remaining site of the two established in NSW.

Its location and siting on an elevated coastal area amongst dense bushland demonstrates Australia's response to the threat of invasion and the importance placed on protecting the industrial centres along NSW coastline during WWII.

The site has potential to yield further information about Australian coastal defence efforts during WWII and the use and development of radar technology.

It has historical associations with the introduction, use and development of radar technology in Australia which is regarded as one of the greatest contributions of Australian science to the war effort. The wartime development of radar in Australia became a key element in the shift towards government sponsored applied scientific research and the gradual independence of Australian science. After the war, radar became a celebrated achievement of science in Australia.

WWII RAAF Radar Station 208 was listed on the New South Wales State Heritage Register on 22 July 2008 having satisfied the following criteria.

The place is important in demonstrating the course, or pattern, of cultural or natural history in New South Wales.

The remains of the former Radar Station 208 illustrates Australia's response to the imminent threat of invasion during WWII and the role of NSW in the defence of Australia. Its setting demonstrates the importance of NSW's industrial region and military efforts for its protection during the war.

It represents a distinct stage of the introduction of radar technology that led to innovative adaptation and advancement of radar technology by Australian scientists and engineers in NSW during WWII.

The place has a strong or special association with a person, or group of persons, of importance of cultural or natural history of New South Wales's history.

The former Radar Station 208 is of State significance for its association with the RAAF which were given responsibility for the nation's air warning defence operations during WWII and exservice RAAF and WAAAF personnel that served during WWII. It has strong associations with the role of women WAAAF who served as radar operators during WWII.

The place is important in demonstrating aesthetic characteristics and/or a high degree of creative or technical achievement in New South Wales.

The technical integrity and aesthetic characteristics have been lost with the removal of associated electrical and timber fabric of the aerial towers. The siting of the above ground bunkers demonstrate an Australian adaptation.

The place has strong or special association with a particular community or cultural group in New South Wales for social, cultural or spiritual reasons.

The former Radar Station 208 is of State significance for its association with veteran groups and RAAF and WAAAF personnel that served during WWII.

The place has potential to yield information that will contribute to an understanding of the cultural or natural history of New South Wales.

It has potential to yield further information about NSW during WWII and its role in the network of the nation's air warning defence during this period. It is a reminder of NSW's role in the introduction and development of radar technology during the war.

The place possesses uncommon, rare or endangered aspects of the cultural or natural history of New South Wales.

The former Radar Station 208 is the only intact example of a WWII ACO radar station in NSW. It was one of nine installations established in Australia during the war, and the only one remaining of the two located in NSW. The use and development of radar is an uncommon aspect of NSW's WWII history.

The place is important in demonstrating the principal characteristics of a class of cultural or natural places/environments in New South Wales.

The former Radar Station 208 retains fabric of the original layout that demonstrates the characteristics of a WWII RAAF radar installation.
