= Pinny Beach, New South Wales =

Pinny Beach New South Wales
- Coordinates: 33°07′01″S 151°38′02″E
- Population: 0 (2021 census)
  - Density: 0.00/km^{2} (0.00/sq mi)
- Established: 2006
- Postcode(s): 2281
- Area: 4.8 km^{2} (1.9 sq mi)
- Location: 3 km (2 mi) SE of Swansea
- LGA(s): City of Lake Macquarie
- Parish: Wallarah
- State electorate(s): Swansea
- Federal division(s): Shortland
Suburbs around Pinny Beach:
Swansea		Caves Beach
Murrays Beach	Pinny Beach	Pacific Ocean
	Catherine Hill Bay	Pacific Ocean

Pinny Beach is a gazetted suburb of the City of Lake Macquarie. It was created on 5 May 2006 following amendments to the boundaries of surrounding suburbs. It is located on the Swansea Peninsula and is to the east of Lake Macquarie, south of the Pacific Ocean entrance channel at Swansea in New South Wales, Australia. It is part of the City of Lake Macquarie local government area.

== History ==
The name Pinny Beach has a direct relationship to the topographic feature designated as Pinny Beach This suburb is adjacent to the suburbs of Caves Beach to the northeast and Murrays Beach to the west where a section of the Pacific Highway forms the boundary.

The Aboriginal people, in this area, the Awabakal, were the first people of this land.

Pinny Beach was once better known as the "windswept heath of Pincushion Plain". It was named after the pincushion-shaped shrubs with sharp needle-like leaves.

== Heritage listings ==
Pinny Beach has a number of heritage-listed sites, including:

- No. 208 Radar Station RAAF
