= Airborne Edge =

Edge
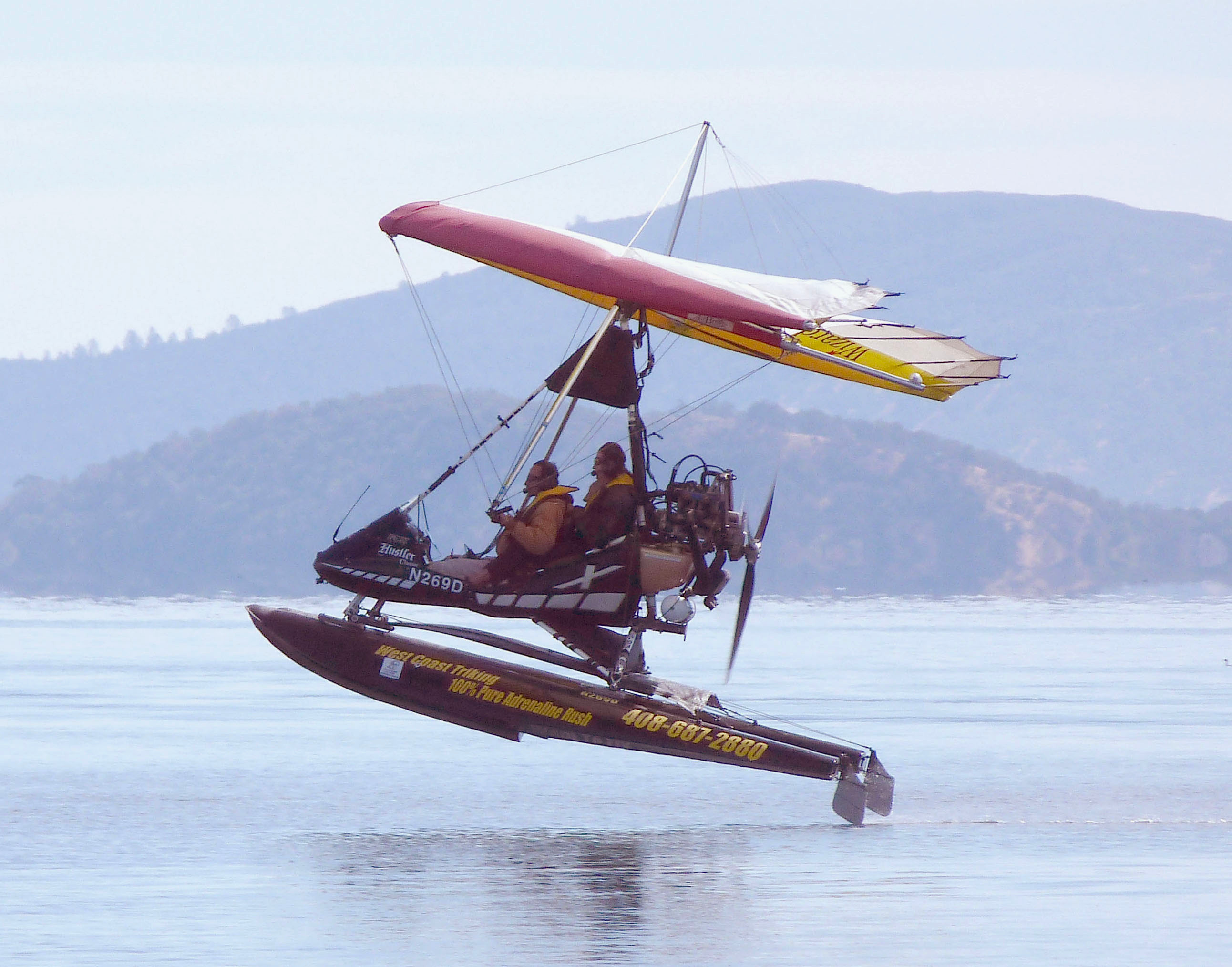

General information
- Type: Ultralight trike
- National origin: Australia
- Manufacturer: Airborne Windsports
- Status: In production

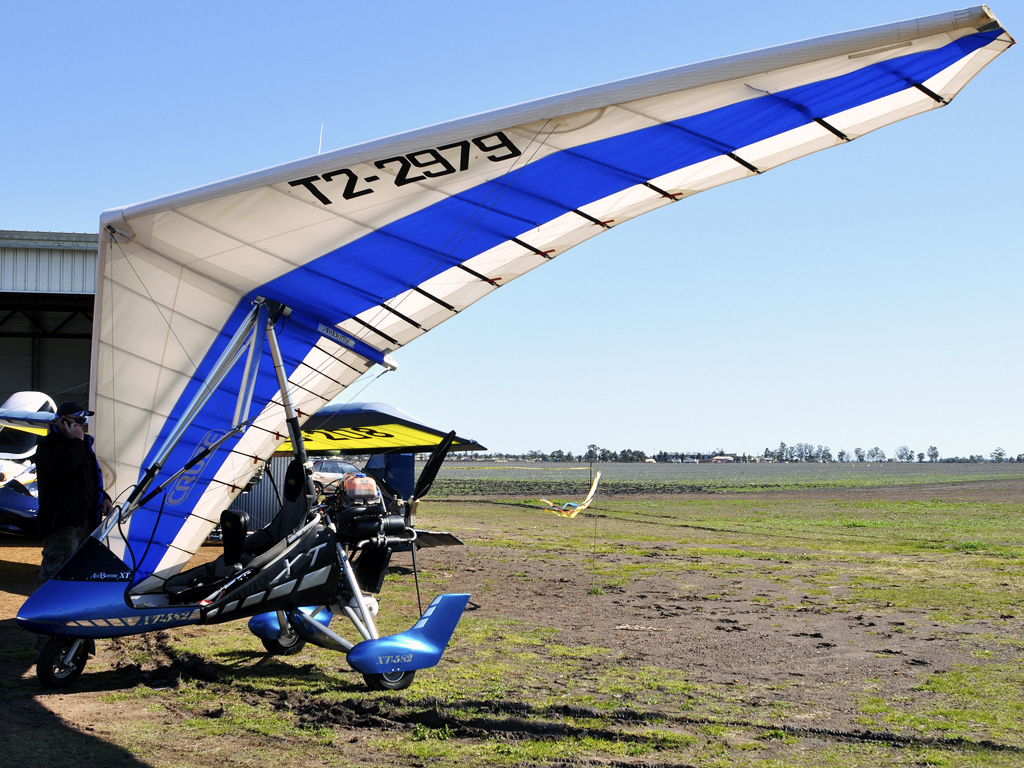
AirBorne Edge XT-912

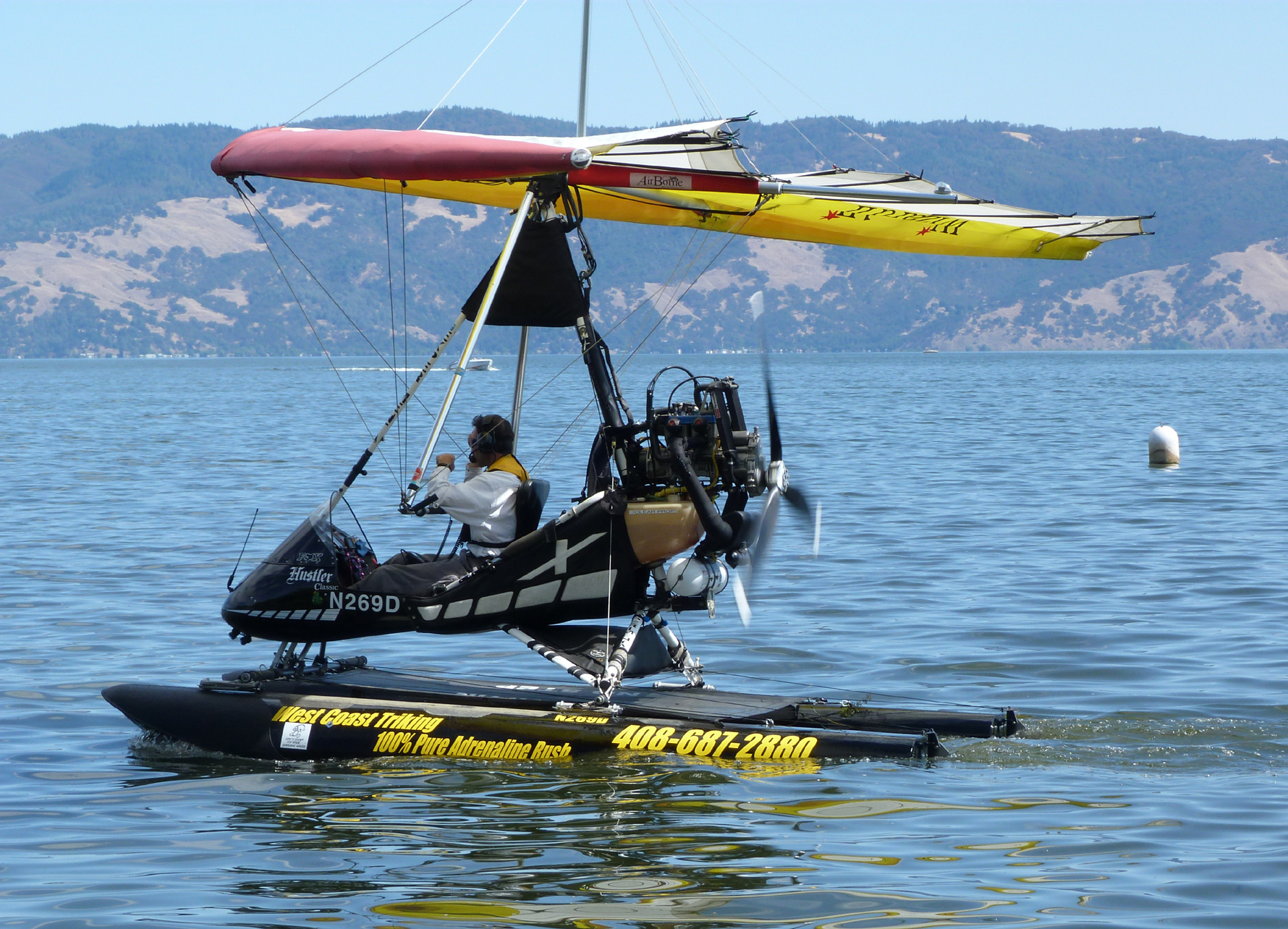
AirBorne Edge X Classic

The Airborne Edge is a line of Australian two-seat ultralight trikes designed and produced by Airborne Windsports of Redhead, New South Wales. The aircraft are supplied as a completed aircraft and not as a kit.

== Design and development ==
The Edge features a cable-braced hang glider-style high-wing, weight-shift controls, a single-seat, open cockpit, tricycle landing gear and a single engine in pusher configuration. It has been produced in many different sub-models and is known in 2012 as the Classic.

The aircraft wing is made from bolted-together aluminium tubing, with its single or optionally double surface wing covered in Dacron sailcloth. Its 33.3 ft (10.1 m) span wing is supported by a single tube-type kingpost and uses an "A" frame control bar. The landing gear features suspension on all three wheels, with the main gear bungee suspended and the nose wheel suspended with rubber blocks. The nose wheel steering includes a dampener and drum brakes. The main wing support mast folds down to allow wing installation. The aircraft can be broken-down for ground transport or storage and assembly for flight can be accomplished in 30 minutes.

The Edge includes full dual controls for flight training, including dual steering, dual control bar extenders and two throttles. Engines supplied include the twin cylinder, two-stroke air-cooled 50 hp (37 kW) Rotax 503 or the liquid-cooled 64 hp (48 kW) Rotax 582.

== Operational history ==
The Edge was flown in west Africa in aerial support of an elephant conservation project and was also used in Indonesia to monitor endangered orangutan populations.

== Variants ==
Edge 582 Executive
Fully equipped model with all the options, including full cockpit fairing and wheel pants, with the Streak double-surface high performance wing and liquid-cooled 64 hp (48 kW) Rotax 582 engine. Sold circa 2000.
Edge X 503 Wizard
Basic model without fairings to reduce weight and cost, with a single surface wing and air-cooled 50 hp (37 kW) Rotax 503 engine. Sold circa 2000.
Classic S
Model sold circa 2004. An Edge model with all options and a liquid-cooled 64 hp (48 kW) Rotax 582 powerplant.
Edge X TS-912/Streak II XT
Model with all options sold circa 2005, with 80 hp (60 kW) Rotax 912 four stroke powerplant and the double surface Streak XT wing. Cruise speed of 75 mph (121 km/h) and price of US$36,353 in 2005.
X-Series Classic
Production model as of 2012, with 64 hp (48 kW) Rotax 582 engine, optional Wizard or Streak wing

== Specifications (Edge Wizard) ==
Data from Cliche

General characteristics

- Crew: one
- Capacity: one passenger
- Wingspan: 33 ft 4 in (10.16 m)
- Empty weight: 408 lb (185 kg)
- Gross weight: 900 lb (408 kg)
- Fuel capacity: 12.7 U.S. gallons (48 L; 10.6 imp gal)
- Powerplant: 1 × Rotax 582 twin cylinder, two-stroke, liquid-cooled aircraft engine, 64 hp (48 kW)

Performance

- Cruise speed: 55 mph (89 km/h, 48 kn)
- Stall speed: 35 mph (56 km/h, 30 kn)
- g limits: +6/-3
- Rate of climb: 750 ft/min (3.8 m/s)
