= Cooma–Snowy Mountains Airport =

- IATA: OOM; ICAO: YCOM

Summary
- Airport type: Public
- Owner: Snowy Mountains Airport Corporation
- Serves: Cooma
- Location: Coolringdon, New South Wales
- Elevation AMSL: 3,106 ft / 947 m
- Coordinates: 36°18′00″S 148°58′24″E
- Website: www.snowymountainsairport.com.au

Map
- Location in New South Wales

Runways
Direction	Length		Surface
Direction	m	ft	Surface
18/36	2,120	6,955	Asphalt
- Sources: AIP

Cooma–Snowy Mountains Airport (marketed as just Snowy Mountains Airport) (IATA: OOM, ICAO: YCOM) is an airport located in Coolringdon, 9 nautical miles (17 km; 10 mi) southwest of Cooma, New South Wales, Australia. The airport serves the town of Cooma and the resorts of the Snowy Mountains and Australian Alps, experiencing increased traffic during the winter months.

== History ==
Construction of a new airport to serve the town of Cooma and surrounding shires was announced in 1955, with funding divided between the Cooma Municipal Council, Snowy River and Monaro shires and the Snowy Mountains Authority. While the authority owned a small airport in the Polo Flat industrial area where it based its fleet of light aircraft, the new facility was built to support commercial services for the surrounding region and handle large turboprop airliners such as the Vickers Viscount. By 1959, Butler Air Transport offered several daily direct flights to Sydney using Fokker F27 Friendship and Convair CV-440 Metropolitan turboprops.

=== 1960s ===
During her 1963 visit to Australia, Queen Elizabeth II and Prince Philip, Duke of Edinburgh arrived and departed from the airport while touring works on the Snowy Mountains Scheme.

On the evening of 21 February 1964, a fire destroyed the original terminal building, which was closed at the time and resulted in no injuries. Scheduled flights were largely unaffected, with passengers using temporary facilities while the terminal was rebuilt. Airline operations at Cooma peaked in the mid-1960s. In January 1965, Ansett and Airlines of New South Wales offered 24 weekly services between Cooma, Sydney and Melbourne (via Canberra), with some flights also continuing on to Bombala. By May of that year, Cooma airport was the second busiest in New South Wales by passenger numbers, prompting the Department of Civil Aviation to establish a permanent Flight Information Service and fire station on the field.

As work on the Snowy Mountains Scheme wound down into the 1970s, air traffic steadily declined. Before airline services were completely withdrawn in the early 2000s, the airport served less than 10,000 annual passengers.

=== 21st century ===
After struggling to maintain a regular airline service to fund upkeep of the facilities, the Snowy River Shire sold the airport to a private operator in 2004 for $500,000. In 2005, Rex Airlines began year-round services on the Cooma-Sydney route with subsidy provided by the new owners, although these services were suspended in 2007. Aeropelican and its successor Brindabella Airlines provided seasonal service from 2010 until 2013 to take advantage of increased demand driven by tourism over the winter snow season, but the collapse of the airline again left Cooma without any scheduled services, prompting Rex to re-enter the Cooma to Sydney route year-round from 2016.

International border closures resulting from the COVID-19 pandemic saw increased demand for domestic tourism and passenger growth for the airport. For the 2021 winter season, QantasLink introduced direct services between Sydney-Cooma, Brisbane-Cooma, and Sydney-Albury, offering 15,000 seats using Bombardier Q400 turboprops.

== Airport facilities and operations ==
Snowy Mountains Airport operates with a single, sealed runway 18/36, 2,120 m (6,960 ft) long by 30 m (98 ft) wide. This code 2C runway is suitable for aircraft up to De Havilland Dash 8 size and is equipped with Precision approach path indicators and pilot-operated lighting for night operations. As of 2023, the secondary gravel runway 14/32 at the southern end of the field is no longer maintained or in use. The volume of traffic is typically low, so the airspace around the airport is uncontrolled and pilots are required to communicate via a Common Traffic Advisory Frequency (CTAF) to safely co-ordinate arrivals and departures. There is both a Non-Directional Beacon (NDB) and Distance measuring equipment radio navigation aids operating at the airport. There are no aviation fuel facilities available.

The small passenger terminal and apron are located at the northern end of the airport, west of the runway. Basic facilities including toilets and refreshments are available for passengers.

In addition to airline services, the airport handles a small number of aeromedical flights and has been used as a staging point for emergency services during the summer bushfire season. Other users include occasional charters and general aviation aircraft.

== Airlines and destinations ==
Airlines	Destinations
QantasLink	Seasonal: Brisbane, Sydney

== Ground transport ==
The airport is immediately adjacent to the Kosciuszko Road linking Cooma to the snowfields. During the ski season, flights are met by airport shuttle services connecting to Jindabyne, the Thredbo ski resort and Skitube Alpine Railway at Bullocks Flat. Prior bookings may be required. Rental cars are also available through Hertz at the airport as is a local taxi service from Cooma.

== See also ==
- List of airports in New South Wales
