= Aeropelican =

Australian airline

IATA	ICAO	Call sign
OT	PEL	PELICAN
- Founded: 23 October 1968
- Commenced operations: 1 July 1971
- Ceased operations: 23 December 2013
- Operating bases: Newcastle; Sydney
- Frequent-flyer program: Qantas Frequent Flyer
- Alliance: Star Alliance (affiliate; 1999–2001)
- Fleet size: 3
- Destinations: 4
- Parent company: Business Air Holdings
- Headquarters: Newcastle, New South Wales, Australia
- Key people: Ian Vanderbeek (Managing Director); Fabrise Binet (Chief Commercial Officer)
- Website: www.aeropelican.com.au

Aeropelican was a regional airline based in Newcastle, New South Wales, Australia. Its main base was Newcastle Airport, with a hub at Sydney Airport.

== History ==
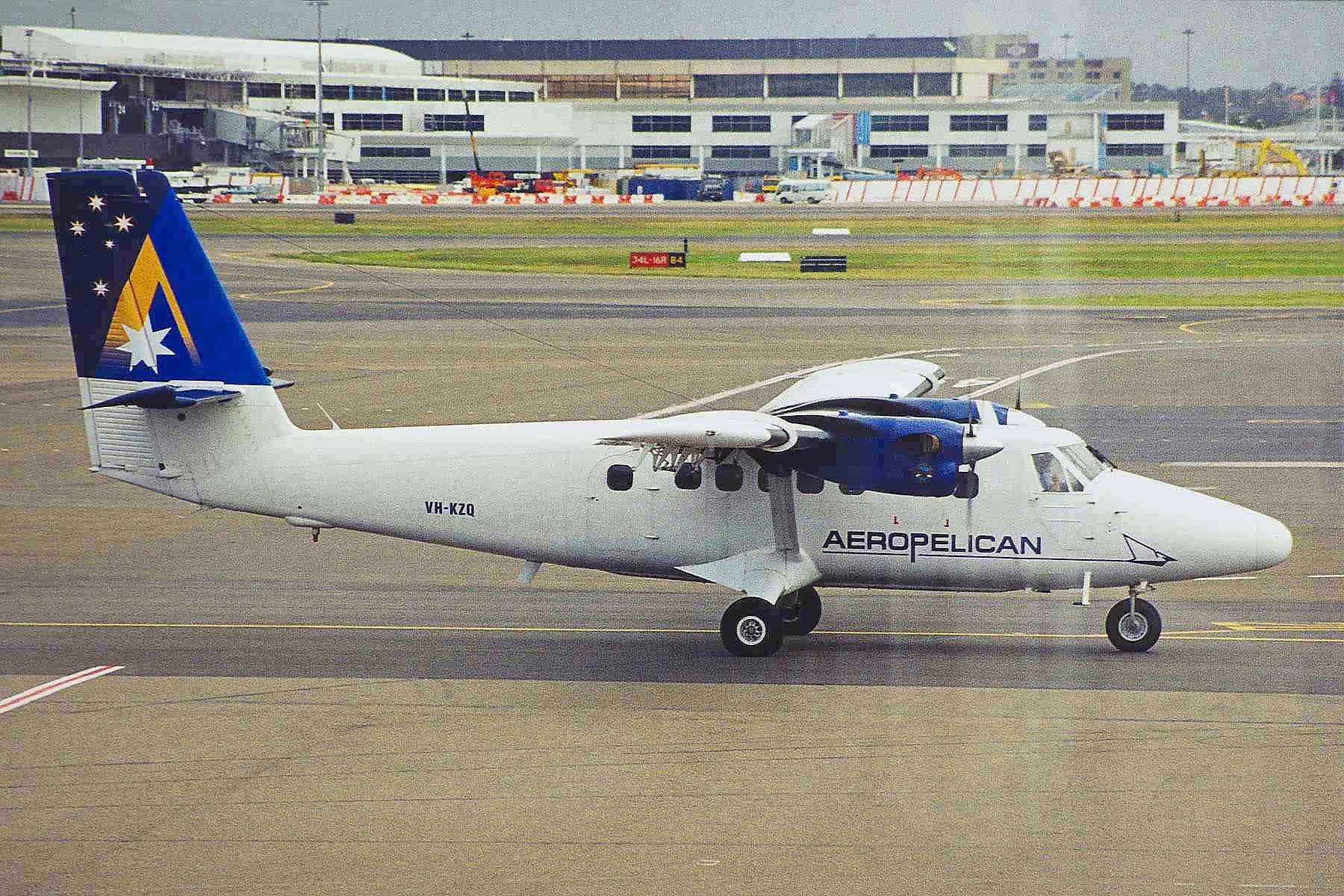
Twin Otter at Sydney Airport in September 1999

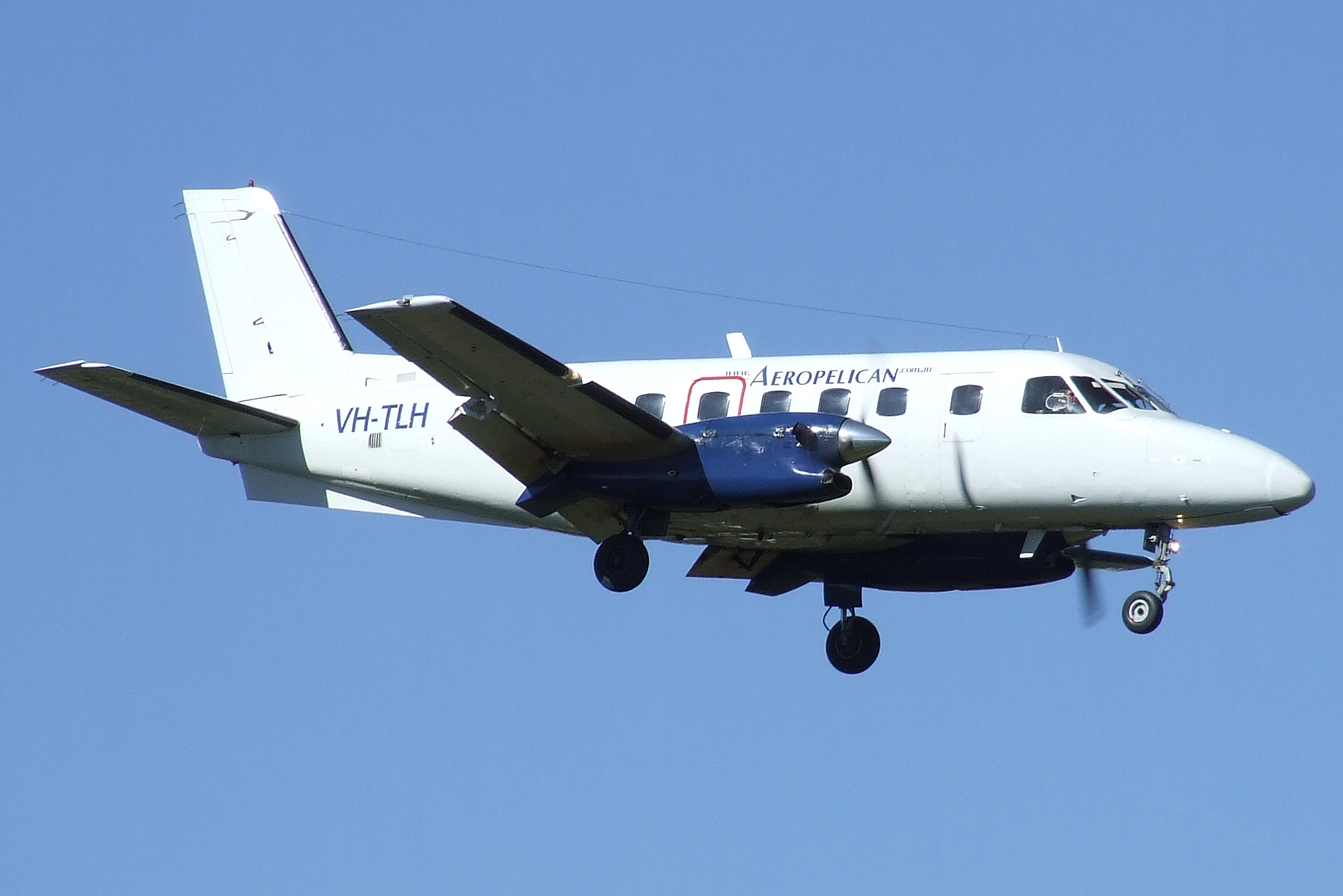
Embraer EMB 110 Bandeirante at Sydney Airport in May 2007

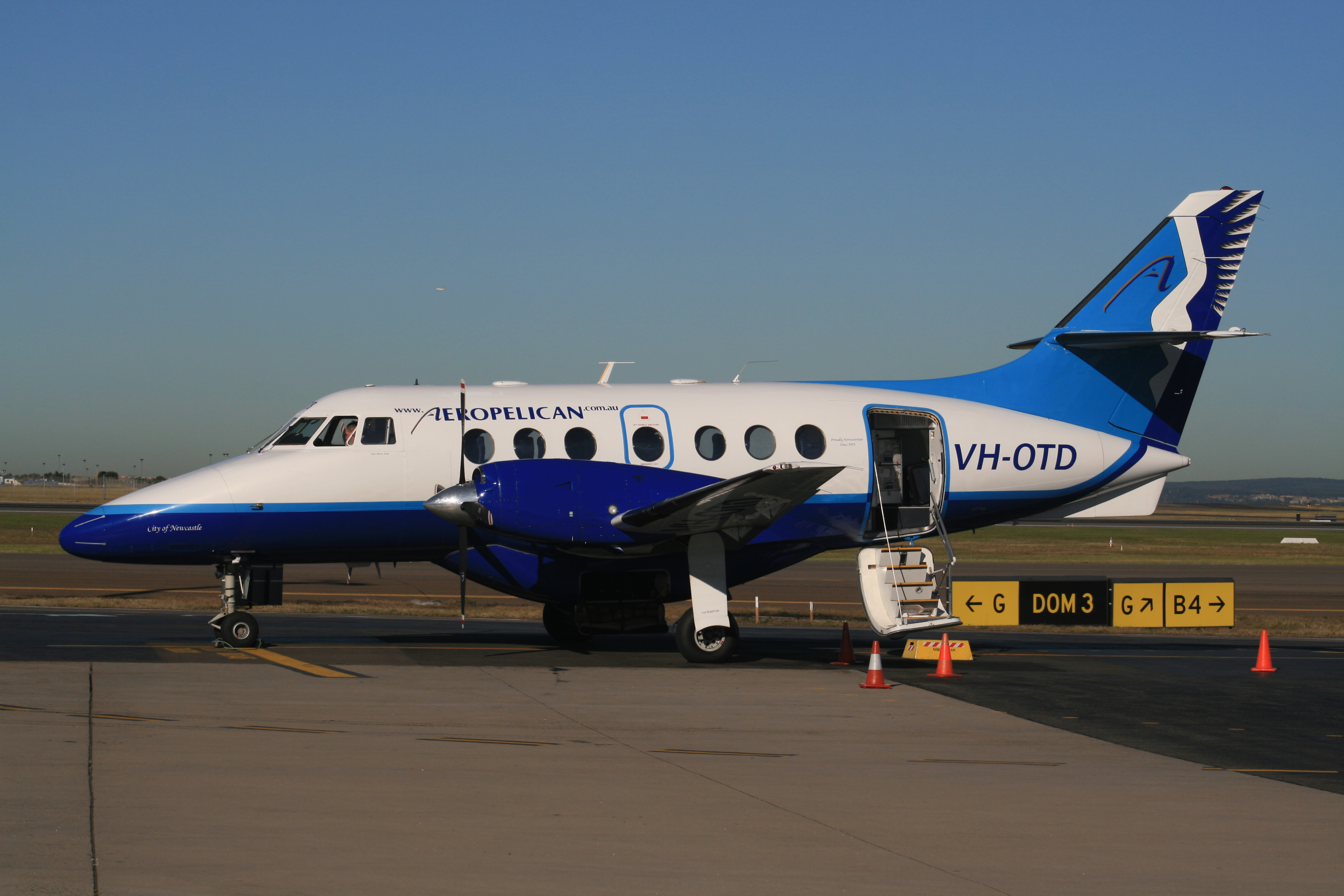
BAe Jetstream 32 at Sydney Airport in July 2007

Aeropelican was established by the Newcastle based Hilder family and commenced operations on 1 July 1971 with a Cessna 402. In 1980 the airline was sold to Masling Airlines, a company associated with Ansett Australia. It operated services for Ansett Australia and by 1991 was a wholly owned subsidiary.

Aeropelican's main route was between Sydney and Belmont Airport in Newcastle's southern suburbs, with high frequency service using de Havilland Canada DHC-6 Twin Otters. Aeropelican originally owned Belmont Airport.

Following the collapse of parent company Ansett Australia in September 2001, Aeropelican was placed into administration. It was acquired by International Air Parts in April 2002. On 20 June 2003 the airline entered into a commercial agreement with Rex Airlines.

Aeropelican commenced services from Sydney to Newcastle Airport on 1 March 2004. An Embraer EMB 110 Bandeirante started services from Newcastle on 20 September 2004 to augment the two Twin Otters used before. In March 2005 the airline discontinued services from Belmont Airport. A Fairchild Metro 23 aircraft was also added to the fleet in 2005 and the Twin Otters were withdrawn. In 2006, three British Aerospace Jetstream 32s were ordered, with plans to announce new services. In December 2006, Aeropelican was awarded the Sydney to Inverell route licence after the previous operator Big Sky Express ceased operations. After the first two Jetstream 32s were placed into service in 2007, the Metro was withdrawn from service. In December 2007 Aeropelican announced that, subject to regulatory approval, it would commence operations between Newcastle and Tamworth on 12 February 2008. The airline subsequently received regulatory approval from the Civil Aviation Safety Authority and commenced operations on the route, however the following September it ceased flights to Tamworth, citing poor passenger numbers on the route.

Also in 2008 International Air Parts sold the airline to Business Air Holdings, owned by former Grand Prix motorcycle racing competitors Roger Burnett and James Toseland.

Tonga's first woman pilot, Silva McLeod, flew for the company during her career.

== Brindabella Airlines merger and demise ==
In October 2011, it was announced by Aeropelican's Chief Commercial Officer, Fabrice Binet, that Canberra-based regional operator Brindabella Airlines would merge with Aeropelican, following the withdrawal of Brindabella's majority shareholder. It was speculated that this merger would add two British Aerospace Jetstream 41 and three Metroliner III turboprops to Aeropelican's fleet. Aeropelican did hint however, that at least one of the BAe Jetstream 41 turboprops would service the Sydney to Cooma-Snowy Mountains Airport route during the 2012 Ski Season. These flights ran from 8 June to 8 September in the 2012 ski season. The end of Aeropelican trading under its own name was 24 June 2013. The merger complete, all flights operated using Brindabella's designator FQ and the former Aeropelican fleet was to be rebranded.

Following a series of groundings of Brindabella's aircraft by the Civil Aviation Safety Authority in November and December 2013, due to overdue engine inspections and maintenance, the airline was forced to suspend all flying operations, and was placed in receivership on 15 December.

On 23 December 2013, it was announced that most of the 140 employees would be retrenched, with a dozen kept on to maintain the aircraft.

FlyPelican was formed in 2015 by former Aeropelican staff using former Aeropelican aircraft.

== Destinations ==
As of April 2012, scheduled services were operated on the following routes:

- Sydney to Mudgee
- Sydney to Narrabri
- Sydney to Newcastle
- Brisbane to Narrabri

== Fleet ==
As of December 2012, the Aeropelican fleet consisted of:

- 3 BAe Jetstream 32
- 2 Fairchild Swearingen Metroliner
- 3 Embraer EMB 110 Bandeirante
