= Airborne Windsports =

Australian aircraft manufacturer

- Type: Private company
- Industry: Aerospace
- Products: Ultralight trikes
- Website: www.airborne.com.au

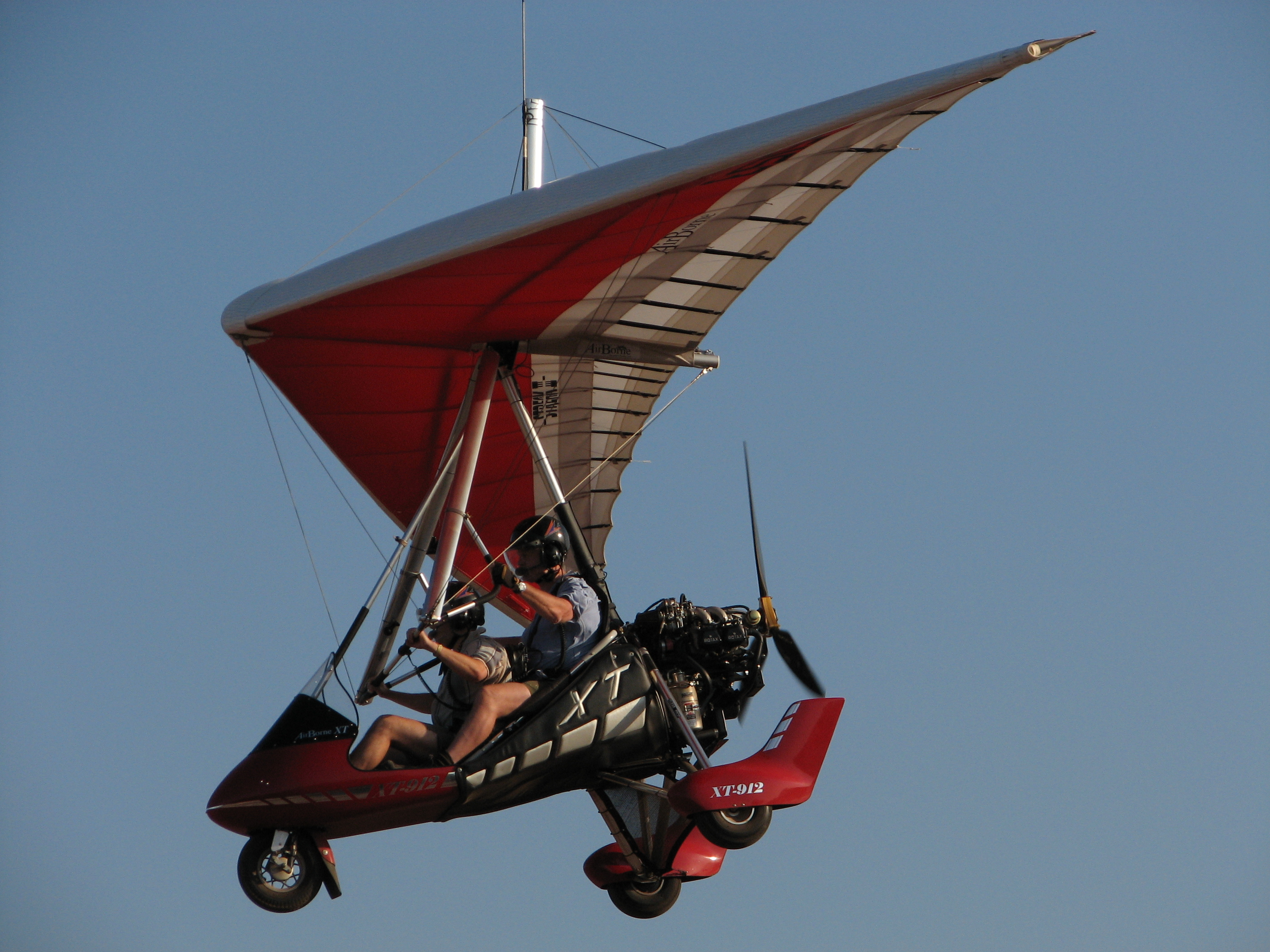
An Airborne XT912 Tourer microlight from AirBorne Windsports

Airborne Windsports, also called Airborne Australia and officially Airborne Windsports Pty Ltd, is an Australian ultralight trike and hang glider aircraft manufacturer based in Redhead, New South Wales. The aircraft are supplied as factory completed aircraft and are not available as kits.

The company has had active representation in the United States by Airborne America of Dallas, Texas and U.S. AirBorne Sport Aviation of Asotin, Washington and has recorded strong sales there.

== Aircraft ==
Summary of aircraft built by Airborne Windsports
Model name	First flight	Number built	Type
Airborne Edge			ultralight trike
Airborne Classic			ultralight trike
Airborne Outback			ultralight trike
Airborne Redback			ultralight trike
Airborne XT			ultralight trike
Airborne T-Lite			ultralight trike
Airborne Rev			hang glider
Airborne Sting			hang glider
Airborne Fun			hang glider
Airborne Climax			hang glider
