= Swansea, New South Wales =

Swansea
- Suburb
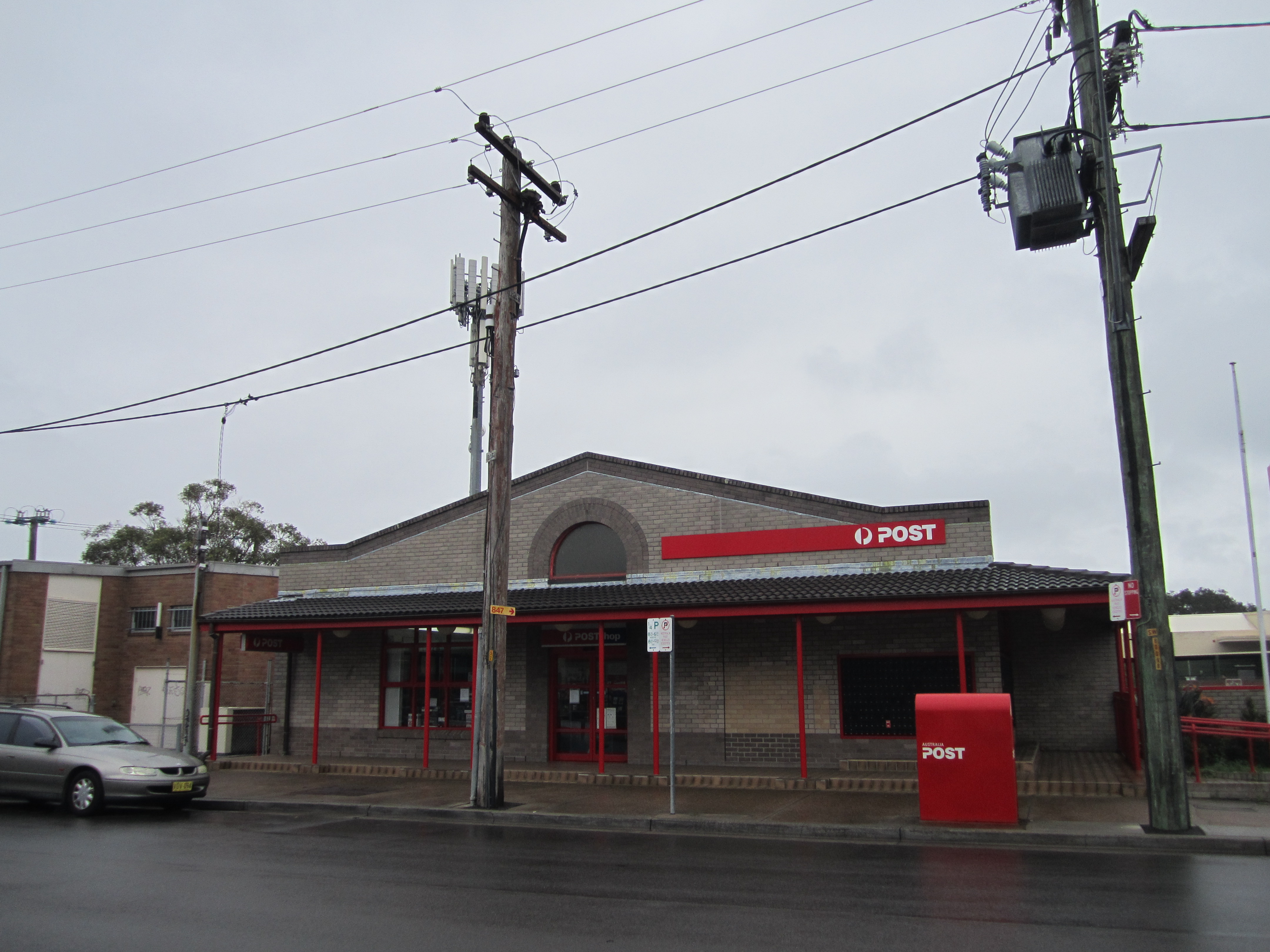
- Post office

- Coordinates: 33°05′06″S 151°38′06″E
- Country: Australia
- State: New South Wales
- City: Greater Newcastle
- LGA: City of Lake Macquarie
- Location: 38 km (24 mi) NE of Wyong; 25 km (16 mi) SSW of Newcastle

Government
  - State electorate: Swansea
  - Federal division: Shortland

Area
  - Total: 3.2 km^{2} (1.2 sq mi)

Population
  - Total: 5,044 (2021 census)
  - Density: 1,576/km^{2} (4,080/sq mi)
- Postcode: 2281
- Parish: Wallarah
Suburbs around Swansea
Lake Macquarie	Lake Macquarie	Swansea Channel
Lake Macquarie	Swansea	Swansea Heads
Murrays Beach	Pinny Beach	Caves Beach

Swansea is a town at the entrance to Lake Macquarie from the Pacific Ocean in New South Wales, Australia. It is part of the City of Lake Macquarie local government area and is regarded as part of Greater Newcastle.

== History ==
The Aboriginal people, in this area, the Awabakal, were the first people of this land. Awabakal people have lived in the area at least 8000 years. The Awabakal name for Swansea is Galgabba.

Thomas Boyd was one of the earliest Europeans to settle in Swansea, in the 1850s. Biraban did translation work in Swansea for settlers. Many Chinese people settled in the same decade, helping to create a fishing industry there. In 1860, there were around 65 people living in Swansea.

In 1887 the town name was changed from Pelican Flat to Swansea.

== See also ==
- Swansea Public School
