= Electoral results for the district of Swansea =

Election results for Swansea, New South Wales, Australia

Swansea, an electoral district of the Legislative Assembly in the Australian state of New South Wales, was created in 1981. Elections have generally been won by the Labor party.

== Members for Swansea ==
| Election | Member | Party |
|---|---|---|
| 1981 | Don Bowman | Labor |
| 1984 | Don Bowman | Labor |
| 1988 | Ivan Welsh | Independent |
| 1991 | Don Bowman | Labor |
| 1995 | Jill Hall | Labor |
| 1999 | Milton Orkopoulos | Labor |
| 2003 | Milton Orkopoulos | Labor |
| 2007 | Robert Coombs | Labor |
| 2011 | Garry Edwards | Liberal |
| 2015 | Yasmin Catley | Labor |
| 2019 | Yasmin Catley | Labor |
| 2023 | Yasmin Catley | Labor |

== Election results ==
=== Elections in the 2020s ===
==== 2023 ====
2023 New South Wales state election: Swansea
| Party | Candidate | Votes | % | ±% |
|---|---|---|---|---|
| Labor | Yasmin Catley | 27,943 | 53.6 | +3.9 |
| Liberal | Megan Anderson | 14,590 | 28.0 | −4.9 |
| Greens | Heather Foord | 4,463 | 8.6 | +1.4 |
| Sustainable Australia | Alan Ellis | 3,253 | 6.2 | +6.2 |
| Liberal Democrats | Paul Jackson | 1,918 | 3.7 | +3.7 |
| Total formal votes | | 52,167 | 96.3 | +0.6 |
| Informal votes | | 2,010 | 3.7 | −0.6 |
| Turnout | | 54,177 | 88.9 | −2.1 |
Two-party-preferred result
| Labor | Yasmin Catley | 30,972 | 65.4 | +4.8 |
| Liberal | Megan Anderson | 16,351 | 34.6 | −4.8 |
| Labor hold | | Swing | +4.8 | |

=== Elections in the 2010s ===
==== 2019 ====
2019 New South Wales state election: Swansea
| Party | Candidate | Votes | % | ±% |
|---|---|---|---|---|
| Labor | Yasmin Catley | 24,371 | 49.54 | +4.51 |
| Liberal | Dean Bowman | 16,123 | 32.78 | +6.86 |
| Greens | Doug Williamson | 3,428 | 6.97 | +1.12 |
| Animal Justice | Julia Riseley | 2,714 | 5.52 | +2.61 |
| Conservatives | Glenn Seddon | 2,556 | 5.20 | +5.20 |
| Total formal votes | | 49,192 | 95.67 | −0.63 |
| Informal votes | | 2,224 | 4.33 | +0.63 |
| Turnout | | 51,416 | 90.71 | −1.27 |
Two-party-preferred result
| Labor | Yasmin Catley | 26,792 | 60.56 | −2.42 |
| Liberal | Dean Bowman | 17,449 | 39.44 | +2.42 |
| Labor hold | | Swing | −2.42 | |

==== 2015 ====
2015 New South Wales state election: Swansea
| Party | Candidate | Votes | % | ±% |
|---|---|---|---|---|
| Labor | Yasmin Catley | 21,712 | 45.0 | +8.8 |
| Liberal | Johanna Uidam | 12,493 | 25.9 | −11.4 |
| Independent | Garry Edwards | 6,484 | 13.4 | +13.4 |
| Greens | Phillipa Parsons | 2,818 | 5.8 | −2.9 |
| Animal Justice | Joshua Agland | 1,402 | 2.9 | +2.9 |
| Independent | Chris Osborne | 1,360 | 2.8 | +2.8 |
| Christian Democrats | Luke Cubis | 1,322 | 2.7 | +0.3 |
| No Land Tax | Paul Doughty | 624 | 1.3 | +1.3 |
| Total formal votes | | 48,215 | 96.3 | −0.1 |
| Informal votes | | 1,850 | 3.7 | +0.1 |
| Turnout | | 50,065 | 92.0 | +0.8 |
Two-party-preferred result
| Labor | Yasmin Catley | 24,148 | 63.0 | +13.3 |
| Liberal | Johanna Uidam | 14,192 | 37.0 | −13.3 |
| Labor gain from Liberal | | Swing | +13.3 | |

==== 2011 ====
2011 New South Wales state election: Swansea
| Party | Candidate | Votes | % | ±% |
|---|---|---|---|---|
| Liberal | Garry Edwards | 17,283 | 37.7 | +14.0 |
| Labor | Robert Coombs | 16,133 | 35.2 | −10.7 |
| Independent | Gillian Sneddon | 7,408 | 16.2 | +16.2 |
| Greens | Phillipa Parsons | 3,845 | 8.4 | −0.2 |
| Christian Democrats | Noreen Tibbey | 1,130 | 2.5 | −0.8 |
| Total formal votes | | 45,799 | 96.9 | −0.2 |
| Informal votes | | 1,476 | 3.1 | +0.2 |
| Turnout | | 47,275 | 94.3 | |
Two-party-preferred result
| Liberal | Garry Edwards | 19,805 | 51.1 | +11.9 |
| Labor | Robert Coombs | 18,928 | 48.9 | −11.9 |
| Liberal gain from Labor | | Swing | +11.9 | |

=== Elections in the 2000s ===
==== 2007 ====
2007 New South Wales state election: Swansea
| Party | Candidate | Votes | % | ±% |
|---|---|---|---|---|
| Labor | Robert Coombs | 19,979 | 45.9 | −11.4 |
| Liberal | Garry Edwards | 10,345 | 23.8 | −4.5 |
| Independent | Laurie Coghlan | 6,453 | 14.8 | +14.8 |
| Greens | Sue Wynn | 3,739 | 8.6 | +2.3 |
| Christian Democrats | Jill Wood | 1,413 | 3.2 | +2.8 |
| AAFI | Barbara Abrahams | 1,038 | 2.4 | +0.5 |
| Democrats | Peter Lee | 574 | 1.3 | −1.1 |
| Total formal votes | | 43,541 | 97.1 | −0.4 |
| Informal votes | | 1,311 | 2.9 | +0.4 |
| Turnout | | 44,852 | 94.2 | |
Two-party-preferred result
| Labor | Robert Coombs | 22,828 | 60.8 | −6.3 |
| Liberal | Garry Edwards | 14,741 | 39.2 | +6.3 |
| Labor hold | | Swing | −6.3 | |

==== 2003 ====
2003 New South Wales state election: Swansea
| Party | Candidate | Votes | % | ±% |
|---|---|---|---|---|
| Labor | Milton Orkopoulos | 24,144 | 55.9 | +4.7 |
| Liberal | Dell Tschanter | 12,679 | 29.4 | +5.9 |
| Greens | Charmian Eckersley | 2,857 | 6.6 | +1.7 |
| Democrats | Peter Lee | 1,312 | 3.0 | −1.0 |
| AAFI | John Ingram | 900 | 2.1 | +2.1 |
| One Nation | James Flowers | 889 | 2.1 | −11.1 |
| Save Our Suburbs | Anthony Meaney | 380 | 0.9 | +0.9 |
| Total formal votes | | 43,161 | 97.5 | −0.3 |
| Informal votes | | 1,116 | 2.5 | +0.3 |
| Turnout | | 44,277 | 93.5 | |
Two-party-preferred result
| Labor | Milton Orkopoulos | 25,902 | 65.9 | −0.7 |
| Liberal | Dell Tschanter | 13,406 | 34.1 | +0.7 |
| Labor hold | | Swing | −0.7 | |

=== Elections in the 1990s ===
==== 1999 ====
1999 New South Wales state election: Swansea
| Party | Candidate | Votes | % | ±% |
|---|---|---|---|---|
| Labor | Milton Orkopoulos | 21,152 | 51.2 | −1.5 |
| Liberal | Jane Wiltshire | 9,712 | 23.5 | −6.7 |
| One Nation | Ronald Gardnir | 5,469 | 13.2 | +13.2 |
| Greens | Deb Gorgievski | 2,038 | 4.9 | +4.9 |
| Democrats | Michelle Walls | 1,671 | 4.0 | +4.0 |
| Christian Democrats | Guy Wood | 1,300 | 3.1 | +3.1 |
| Total formal votes | | 41,342 | 97.8 | +2.6 |
| Informal votes | | 922 | 2.2 | −2.6 |
| Turnout | | 42,264 | 95.1 | |
Two-party-preferred result
| Labor | Milton Orkopoulos | 23,507 | 66.6 | +5.9 |
| Liberal | Jane Wiltshire | 11,803 | 33.4 | −5.9 |
| Labor hold | | Swing | +5.9 | |

==== 1995 ====
1995 New South Wales state election: Swansea
| Party | Candidate | Votes | % | ±% |
|---|---|---|---|---|
| Labor | Jill Hall | 18,846 | 52.7 | +7.1 |
| Liberal | Laurie Coghlan | 10,977 | 30.7 | +12.4 |
| Independent | Mark Booth | 5,947 | 16.6 | +16.6 |
| Total formal votes | | 35,770 | 95.2 | +2.7 |
| Informal votes | | 1,787 | 4.8 | −2.7 |
| Turnout | | 37,557 | 94.9 | |
Two-party-preferred result
| Labor | Jill Hall | 20,830 | 60.5 | +4.1 |
| Liberal | Laurie Coghlan | 13,611 | 39.5 | +39.5 |
| Labor hold | | Swing | +4.1 | |

==== 1991 ====
1991 New South Wales state election: Swansea
| Party | Candidate | Votes | % | ±% |
|---|---|---|---|---|
| Labor | Don Bowman | 14,658 | 45.6 | +6.6 |
| Independent | Ivan Welsh | 7,745 | 24.1 | −11.9 |
| Liberal | Laurie Coghlan | 5,888 | 18.3 | −3.8 |
| Democrats | Michael Reckenberg | 1,617 | 5.0 | +2.2 |
| Independent | John Selway | 1,400 | 4.4 | +4.4 |
| Call to Australia | Ivan Morrow | 629 | 2.0 | +2.0 |
| Independent | Harold Pyke | 195 | 0.6 | +0.6 |
| Total formal votes | | 32,132 | 92.6 | −4.5 |
| Informal votes | | 2,579 | 7.4 | +4.5 |
| Turnout | | 34,711 | 94.9 | |
Two-candidate-preferred result
| Labor | Don Bowman | 16,539 | 56.4 | +14.0 |
| Independent | Ivan Welsh | 12,797 | 43.6 | −14.0 |
| Labor gain from Independent | | Swing | +14.0 | |

=== Elections in the 1980s ===
==== 1988 ====
1988 New South Wales state election: Swansea
| Party | Candidate | Votes | % | ±% |
|---|---|---|---|---|
| Independent | Ivan Welsh | 12,145 | 38.7 | +38.7 |
| Labor | Don Bowman | 12,112 | 38.6 | −23.4 |
| Liberal | Linda Donovan | 6,168 | 19.6 | −6.8 |
| Democrats | Shane Simpson | 967 | 3.1 | −3.5 |
| Total formal votes | | 31,392 | 97.0 | −0.5 |
| Informal votes | | 973 | 3.0 | +0.5 |
| Turnout | | 32,365 | 95.7 | |
Two-candidate-preferred result
| Independent | Ivan Welsh | 17,631 | 58.4 | +58.4 |
| Labor | Don Bowman | 12,545 | 41.6 | −27.1 |
| Independent gain from Labor | | Swing | +58.4 | |

==== 1984 ====
1984 New South Wales state election: Swansea
| Party | Candidate | Votes | % | ±% |
|---|---|---|---|---|
| Labor | Don Bowman | 21,913 | 65.0 | −6.2 |
| Liberal | Milton Caine | 7,718 | 22.9 | +7.1 |
| Socialist Labour | Ann Leahy | 2,113 | 6.3 | +6.3 |
| Democrats | Lyn Godfrey | 1,985 | 5.9 | −7.0 |
| Total formal votes | | 33,729 | 97.1 | +0.7 |
| Informal votes | | 1,008 | 2.9 | −0.7 |
| Turnout | | 34,737 | 94.1 | +0.9 |
Two-party-preferred result
| Labor | Don Bowman | | 72.2 | −6.6 |
| Liberal | Milton Caine | | 27.8 | +6.6 |
| Labor hold | | Swing | −6.6 | |

==== 1981 ====
1981 New South Wales state election: Swansea
| Party | Candidate | Votes | % | ±% |
|---|---|---|---|---|
| Labor | Don Bowman | 22,375 | 71.2 | −7.5 |
| Liberal | Denis Dolan | 4,976 | 15.8 | −5.5 |
| Democrats | Lyn Godfrey | 4,060 | 12.9 | +12.9 |
| Total formal votes | | 31,411 | 96.4 | |
| Informal votes | | 1,187 | 3.6 | |
| Turnout | | 32,598 | 93.2 | |
Two-party-preferred result
| Labor | Don Bowman | 23,276 | 78.8 | +0.1 |
| Liberal | Denis Dolan | 6,276 | 21.2 | −0.1 |
| Labor notional hold | | Swing | +0.1 | |
