= Electoral results for the Division of Shortland =

Australian division election results

This is a list of electoral results for the Division of Shortland in Australian federal elections from the division's creation in 1949 until the present.

== Members ==
Member	Party	Term
Charles Griffiths	Labor	1949–1972
Peter Morris	Labor	1972–1998
Jill Hall	Labor	1998–2016
Pat Conroy	Labor	2016–present

== Election results ==
=== Elections in the 2020s ===
==== 2025 ====
2025 Australian federal election: Shortland
Party	Candidate	Votes	%	±%
Libertarian	Geoffrey Mark Robertson			
Independent	James Pheils			
Labor	Pat Conroy			
One Nation	Barry Reed			
Family First	Pietro Di Girolamo			
Liberal	Emma King			
Greens	Therese Doyle			
Total formal votes				
Informal votes				
Turnout				

==== 2022 ====
2022 Australian federal election: Shortland
Party	Candidate	Votes	%	±%
Labor	Pat Conroy	40,135	40.02	−1.11
Liberal	Nell McGill	32,215	32.12	−5.25
Greens	Kim Grierson	9,910	9.88	+1.62
One Nation	Quintin King	6,397	6.38	+6.38
United Australia	Kenneth Maxwell	3,125	3.12	−1.41
Liberal Democrats	Barry Reed	2,984	2.98	+2.98
Animal Justice	Bree Roberts	2,979	2.97	−0.63
Independent	Basil Paynter	2,554	2.55	+2.55
Total formal votes		100,299	93.94	+0.35
Informal votes		6,467	6.06	−0.35
Turnout		106,766	91.85	−1.81
Two-party-preferred result
Labor	Pat Conroy	55,985	55.82	+1.37
Liberal	Nell McGill	44,314	44.18	−1.37
Labor hold		Swing	+1.37	

Alluvial diagram for preference flows in the seat of Shortland in the 2022 federal election. indicates at what stage the winning candidate had over 50% of the votes and was declared the winner.

=== Elections in the 2010s ===
==== 2019 ====
2019 Australian federal election: Shortland
Party	Candidate	Votes	%	±%
Labor	Pat Conroy	41,126	41.13	−10.04
Liberal	Nell McGill	37,363	37.37	+2.17
Greens	Wylie Campbell	8,256	8.26	−1.20
United Australia	Dani Rifai	4,532	4.53	+4.53
Animal Justice	Bryan McGrath	3,596	3.60	+3.60
Sustainable Australia	Susan Newbury	3,097	3.10	+3.10
Christian Democrats	Xing Yu	2,010	2.01	−2.15
Total formal votes		99,980	93.59	−1.70
Informal votes		6,847	6.41	+1.70
Turnout		106,827	93.66	+0.21
Two-party-preferred result
Labor	Pat Conroy	54,437	54.45	−5.49
Liberal	Nell McGill	45,543	45.55	+5.49
Labor hold		Swing	−5.49	

==== 2016 ====
2016 Australian federal election: Shortland
Party	Candidate	Votes	%	±%
Labor	Pat Conroy	50,164	51.17	+3.00
Liberal	Jenny Barrie	34,514	35.20	−1.30
Greens	Ivan Macfadyen	9,279	9.46	+3.14
Christian Democrats	Morgan Cox	4,081	4.16	+2.59
Total formal votes		98,038	95.29	+1.58
Informal votes		4,845	4.71	−1.58
Turnout		102,883	93.45	−2.73
Two-party-preferred result
Labor	Pat Conroy	58,761	59.94	+2.54
Liberal	Jenny Barrie	39,277	40.06	−2.54
Labor hold		Swing	+2.54	

==== 2013 ====
2013 Australian federal election: Shortland
Party	Candidate	Votes	%	±%
Labor	Jill Hall	41,892	48.69	−5.05
Liberal	John Church	32,532	37.81	+4.65
Palmer United	Philip Baldwin	5,341	6.21	+6.21
Greens	Jane Oakley	5,198	6.04	−4.29
Christian Democrats	Andrew Weatherstone	1,081	1.26	+1.26
Total formal votes		86,044	93.99	+0.33
Informal votes		5,498	6.01	−0.33
Turnout		91,542	94.44	−0.42
Two-party-preferred result
Labor	Jill Hall	49,230	57.21	−5.64
Liberal	John Church	36,814	42.79	+5.64
Labor hold		Swing	−5.64	

==== 2010 ====
2010 Australian federal election: Shortland
Party	Candidate	Votes	%	±%
Labor	Jill Hall	44,987	53.74	−2.99
Liberal	Deborah Narayanan	27,758	33.16	+2.04
Greens	Phillipa Parsons	8,646	10.33	+2.03
One Nation	Milton Alchin	1,726	2.06	+2.06
Secular	Peter Williams	596	0.71	+0.71
Total formal votes		83,713	93.66	−2.18
Informal votes		5,671	6.34	+2.18
Turnout		89,384	94.84	−1.44
Two-party-preferred result
Labor	Jill Hall	52,612	62.85	−1.89
Liberal	Deborah Narayanan	31,101	37.15	+1.89
Labor hold		Swing	−1.89	

=== Elections in the 2000s ===
==== 2007 ====
2007 Australian federal election: Shortland
Party	Candidate	Votes	%	±%
Labor	Jill Hall	48,525	56.73	+7.40
Liberal	Jon Kealy	26,620	31.12	−4.69
Greens	Keith Parsons	7,097	8.30	+0.15
Christian Democrats	Les Wallace	1,655	1.93	+1.93
Family First	Matthew Reeves	1,644	1.92	−0.49
Total formal votes		85,541	95.84	+0.41
Informal votes		3,714	4.16	−0.41
Turnout		89,255	95.78	−0.46
Two-party-preferred result
Labor	Jill Hall	55,379	64.74	+5.50
Liberal	Jon Kealy	30,162	35.26	−5.50
Labor hold		Swing	+5.50	

==== 2004 ====
2004 Australian federal election: Shortland
Party	Candidate	Votes	%	±%
Labor	Jill Hall	40,069	49.91	+0.21
Liberal	Dell Tschanter	28,745	35.81	+1.14
Greens	Bob Phillips	6,333	7.89	+3.77
One Nation	Florence Roberts	2,113	2.63	−2.05
Family First	Brian Dixon	1,804	2.25	+2.25
Democrats	Peter Lee	1,211	1.51	−1.64
Total formal votes		80,275	95.38	−0.06
Informal votes		3,884	4.62	+0.06
Turnout		84,159	95.54	−0.12
Two-party-preferred result
Labor	Jill Hall	47,754	59.49	+0.71
Liberal	Dell Tschanter	32,521	40.51	−0.71
Labor hold		Swing	+0.71	

==== 2001 ====
2001 Australian federal election: Shortland
Party	Candidate	Votes	%	±%
Labor	Jill Hall	39,139	49.70	−2.24
Liberal	Brian Perrem	27,302	34.67	+6.33
One Nation	Iris Candlish	3,686	4.68	−5.63
Greens	Joan Lambert	3,242	4.12	+0.60
Democrats	Steven Adams	2,484	3.15	−0.25
Independent	Peter Craig	2,312	2.94	+2.94
Independent	Ron Gardnir	590	0.75	+0.75
Total formal votes		78,755	95.44	−1.60
Informal votes		3,765	4.56	+1.60
Turnout		82,520	96.19	
Two-party-preferred result
Labor	Jill Hall	46,290	58.78	−3.45
Liberal	Brian Perrem	32,465	41.22	+3.45
Labor hold		Swing	−3.45	

=== Elections in the 1990s ===
==== 1998 ====
1998 Australian federal election: Shortland
Party	Candidate	Votes	%	±%
Labor	Jill Hall	38,004	51.78	+0.90
Liberal	Peter Craig	20,733	28.25	−6.24
One Nation	Ron Gardnir	7,499	10.22	+10.22
Greens	Rebecca Moroney	2,681	3.65	−0.66
Democrats	Aysha Pollnitz	2,605	3.55	−3.37
Independent	Ivan Welsh	1,878	2.56	+2.56
Total formal votes		73,400	97.13	−0.06
Informal votes		2,167	2.87	+0.06
Turnout		75,567	96.23	−1.04
Two-party-preferred result
Labor	Jill Hall	46,100	62.81	+4.66
Liberal	Peter Craig	27,300	37.19	−4.66
Labor hold		Swing	+4.66	

==== 1996 ====
1996 Australian federal election: Shortland
Party	Candidate	Votes	%	±%
Labor	Peter Morris	36,603	50.88	−10.96
Liberal	David Parker	24,812	34.49	+5.62
Democrats	Kaye Westbury	4,977	6.92	+1.36
Greens	Ian McKenzie	3,102	4.31	+4.31
Independent	Richard Hill	1,898	2.64	+2.65
	Terry Cook	547	0.76	−0.30
Total formal votes		71,939	97.20	−0.25
Informal votes		2,075	2.80	+0.25
Turnout		74,014	97.27	+0.66
Two-party-preferred result
Labor	Peter Morris	41,660	58.15	−9.18
Liberal	David Parker	29,982	41.85	+9.18
Labor hold		Swing	−9.18	

==== 1993 ====
1993 Australian federal election: Shortland
Party	Candidate	Votes	%	±%
Labor	Peter Morris	43,012	61.84	+7.80
Liberal	Laurie Coghlan	20,082	28.87	+6.19
Democrats	Michael Reckenberg	3,864	5.56	−5.14
Call to Australia	Ivan Morrow	1,113	1.60	+1.60
	Terry Cook	737	1.06	+1.06
Natural Law	Brett Randall	413	0.59	+0.59
	Geoff Payne	329	0.47	+0.47
Total formal votes		69,550	97.44	−0.04
Informal votes		1,824	2.56	+0.04
Turnout		71,374	96.61	
Two-party-preferred result
Labor	Peter Morris	46,813	67.33	+1.54
Liberal	Laurie Coghlan	22,713	32.67	−1.54
Labor hold		Swing	+1.54	

==== 1990 ====
1990 Australian federal election: Shortland
Party	Candidate	Votes	%	±%
Labor	Peter Morris	35,269	51.4	−3.6
Liberal	Lynne Hall	15,535	22.7	−8.9
Democrats	Michael Reckenberg	7,975	11.6	−1.8
Independent	Lorraine Welsh	5,839	8.5	+8.5
Independent	Mark Booth	2,983	4.4	+4.4
Independent	Geoff Ellis	771	1.1	+1.1
Independent	Clay Robinson	187	0.3	+0.3
Total formal votes		68,559	97.5	
Informal votes		1,724	2.5	
Turnout		70,283	96.5	
Two-party-preferred result
Labor	Peter Morris	43,951	64.3	+3.2
Liberal	Lynne Hall	24,361	35.7	−3.2
Labor hold		Swing	+3.2	

=== Elections in the 1980s ===
==== 1987 ====
1987 Australian federal election: Shortland
Party	Candidate	Votes	%	±%
Labor	Peter Morris	35,916	55.0	−3.2
Liberal	Milton Caine	20,652	31.6	−0.7
Democrats	Derek McCabe	8,727	13.4	+5.4
Total formal votes		64,295	95.7	
Informal votes		2,962	4.3	
Turnout		68,257	95.9	
Two-party-preferred result
Labor	Peter Morris	39,890	61.1	−2.0
Liberal	Milton Caine	25,405	38.9	+2.0
Labor hold		Swing	−2.0	

==== 1984 ====
1984 Australian federal election: Shortland
Party	Candidate	Votes	%	±%
Labor	Peter Morris	36,855	58.2	−1.0
Liberal	Milton Caine	20,459	32.3	+2.4
Democrats	John Aitken	5,058	8.0	+2.0
Independent	Jane Power	1,005	1.6	+1.6
Total formal votes		63,377	94.4	
Informal votes		3,794	5.6	
Turnout		67,171	96.0	
Two-party-preferred result
Labor	Peter Morris	40,005	63.1	−4.2
Liberal	Milton Caine	23,370	36.9	+4.2
Labor hold		Swing	−4.2	

==== 1983 ====
1983 Australian federal election: Shortland
Party	Candidate	Votes	%	±%
Labor	Peter Morris	49,275	62.7	+1.7
Liberal	Peter Wilson	20,781	26.4	−1.2
Democrats	Lyn Godfrey	4,677	6.0	−0.8
Socialist Workers	Peter Abrahamson	2,584	3.3	+3.3
Socialist Labour	Robert Buhler	1,280	1.6	+1.6
Total formal votes		78,597	98.2	
Informal votes		1,455	1.8	
Turnout		80,052	96.3	
Two-party-preferred result
Labor	Peter Morris		70.8	+1.5
Liberal	Peter Wilson		29.2	−1.5
Labor hold		Swing	+1.5	

==== 1980 ====
1980 Australian federal election: Shortland
Party	Candidate	Votes	%	±%
Labor	Peter Morris	45,509	61.0	+6.5
Liberal	Eddie Namir	20,611	27.6	−7.6
Democrats	Lionel Lambkin	5,111	6.8	−3.5
Socialist Labour	Robert Buhler	3,422	4.6	+4.6
Total formal votes		74,653	98.0	
Informal votes		1,497	2.0	
Turnout		76,150	96.0	
Two-party-preferred result
Labor	Peter Morris		69.3	+9.6
Liberal	Eddie Namir		30.7	−9.6
Labor hold		Swing	+9.6	

=== Elections in the 1970s ===
==== 1977 ====
1977 Australian federal election: Shortland
Party	Candidate	Votes	%	±%
Labor	Peter Morris	37,406	54.5	−4.5
Liberal	Richard Bevan	24,178	35.2	−3.0
Democrats	Lionel Lambkin	7,058	10.3	+10.3
Total formal votes		68,642	98.0	
Informal votes		1,415	2.0	
Turnout		70,057	96.0	
Two-party-preferred result
Labor	Peter Morris		59.7	−0.7
Liberal	Richard Bevan		40.3	+0.7
Labor hold		Swing	−0.7	

==== 1975 ====
1975 Australian federal election: Shortland
Party	Candidate	Votes	%	±%
Labor	Peter Morris	34,182	56.9	−6.6
Liberal	Richard Bevan	24,215	40.3	+9.9
Independent	Barbara Timmins	872	1.5	+1.5
Independent	Lionel Lambkin	800	1.3	+1.3
Total formal votes		60,069	98.7	
Informal votes		790	1.3	
Turnout		60,859	96.2	
Two-party-preferred result
Labor	Peter Morris		58.3	−8.0
Liberal	Richard Bevan		41.7	+8.0
Labor hold		Swing	−8.0	

==== 1974 ====
1974 Australian federal election: Shortland
Party	Candidate	Votes	%	±%
Labor	Peter Morris	37,031	63.5	+7.6
Liberal	David Morris	17,756	30.4	+3.4
Independent	Lionel Lambkin	2,063	3.5	+3.5
Australia	John Steele	1,493	2.6	+2.6
Total formal votes		58,343	98.3	
Informal votes		997	1.7	
Turnout		59,340	96.6	
Two-party-preferred result
Labor	Peter Morris		66.3	+2.6
Liberal	David Morris		32.7	−2.6
Labor hold		Swing	+2.6	

==== 1972 ====
1972 Australian federal election: Shortland
Party	Candidate	Votes	%	±%
Labor	Peter Morris	29,604	55.9	−4.1
Liberal	Paul Clarkson	14,287	27.0	−3.5
Independent	Leo Gately	3,905	7.4	+7.4
Democratic Labor	Hugh Ansell	2,549	4.8	−0.3
Australia	Charles Hockings	1,669	3.2	+3.2
Communist	Geoff Curthoys	594	1.1	−0.9
Independent	Lionel Lambkin	356	0.7	+0.7
Total formal votes		52,964	98.2	
Informal votes		976	1.8	
Turnout		53,940	96.2	
Two-party-preferred result
Labor	Peter Morris		63.7	+0.2
Liberal	Paul Clarkson		36.3	−0.2
Labor hold		Swing	+0.2	

=== Elections in the 1960s ===
==== 1969 ====
1969 Australian federal election: Shortland
Party	Candidate	Votes	%	±%
Labor	Charles Griffiths	29,371	60.0	+5.9
Liberal	Paul Clarkson	14,909	30.5	−7.5
Democratic Labor	Robert Burke	2,502	5.1	+0.5
Australia	Charles Hockings	1,149	2.3	+2.3
Communist	Geoff Curthoys	991	2.0	−0.8
Total formal votes		48,922	97.9	
Informal votes		1,052	2.1	
Turnout		49,974	96.2	
Two-party-preferred result
Labor	Charles Griffiths		64.0	+5.3
Liberal	Paul Clarkson		36.0	−5.3
Labor hold		Swing	+5.3	

==== 1966 ====
1966 Australian federal election: Shortland
Party	Candidate	Votes	%	±%
Labor	Charles Griffiths	30,309	53.3	−7.3
Liberal	Malcolm Blackshaw	20,956	36.8	+9.5
Democratic Labor	Robert Burke	2,747	4.8	−4.4
Communist	Geoff Curthoys	1,600	2.8	−0.1
Independent	Stanley Millington	1,262	2.2	+2.2
Total formal votes		56,874	96.9	
Informal votes		1,803	3.1	
Turnout		58,677	96.4	
Two-party-preferred result
Labor	Charles Griffiths		57.9	−7.0
Liberal	Malcolm Blackshaw		42.1	+7.0
Labor hold		Swing	−7.0	

==== 1963 ====
1963 Australian federal election: Shortland
Party	Candidate	Votes	%	±%
Labor	Charles Griffiths	32,270	60.6	−4.2
Liberal	William Gilchrist	14,535	27.3	+2.9
Democratic Labor	Robert Burke	4,922	9.2	+1.0
Communist	Barbara Curthoys	1,538	2.9	+0.2
Total formal votes		53,265	98.3	
Informal votes		925	1.7	
Turnout		54,190	97.3	
Two-party-preferred result
Labor	Charles Griffiths		64.9	−4.7
Liberal	William Gilchrist		35.1	+4.7
Labor hold		Swing	−4.7	

==== 1961 ====
1961 Australian federal election: Shortland
Party	Candidate	Votes	%	±%
Labor	Charles Griffiths	32,127	64.8	+3.8
Liberal	Allan Pitts	12,100	24.4	−2.0
Democratic Labor	Robert Burke	4,047	8.2	−0.9
Communist	Geoff Curthoys	1,341	2.7	−0.8
Total formal votes		49,615	97.2	
Informal votes		1,410	2.8	
Turnout		51,025	96.3	
Two-party-preferred result
Labor	Charles Griffiths		69.6	+3.9
Liberal	Allan Pitts		30.4	−3.9
Labor hold		Swing	+3.9	

=== Elections in the 1950s ===
==== 1958 ====
1958 Australian federal election: Shortland
Party	Candidate	Votes	%	±%
Labor	Charles Griffiths	27,366	61.0	−2.2
Liberal	Hilary Fallins	11,861	26.4	−10.4
Democratic Labor	Robert Burke	4,096	9.1	+9.1
Communist	William Quinn	1,561	3.5	+3.5
Total formal votes		44,884	96.9	
Informal votes		1,449	3.1	
Turnout		46,333	96.5	
Two-party-preferred result
Labor	Charles Griffiths		65.7	+2.5
Liberal	Hilary Fallins		34.3	−2.5
Labor hold		Swing	+2.5	

==== 1955 ====
1955 Australian federal election: Shortland
Party	Candidate	Votes	%	±%
Labor	Charles Griffiths	26,066	63.2	−3.8
Liberal	Gordon Greig	15,179	36.8	+3.8
Total formal votes		41,245	96.8	
Informal votes		1,364	3.2	
Turnout		42,609	96.0	
Labor hold		Swing	−3.8	

==== 1954 ====
1954 Australian federal election: Shortland
Party	Candidate	Votes	%	±%
Labor	Charles Griffiths	27,226	64.4	−0.6
Liberal	Arthur Downey	15,044	35.6	+0.6
Total formal votes		42,270	98.8	
Informal votes		509	1.2	
Turnout		42,779	97.0	
Labor hold		Swing	−0.6	

==== 1951 ====
1951 Australian federal election: Shortland
Party	Candidate	Votes	%	±%
Labor	Charles Griffiths	26,708	65.0	+10.6
Liberal	Arthur Downey	14,369	35.0	+8.9
Total formal votes		41,077	98.1	
Informal votes		781	1.9	
Turnout		41,858	97.0	
Labor hold		Swing	+0.9	

=== Elections in the 1940s ===
==== 1949 ====
1949 Australian federal election: Shortland
Party	Candidate	Votes	%	±%
Labor	Charles Griffiths	21,921	54.4	−12.8
Liberal	Harold Daisley	10,513	26.1	+7.1
Independent	Alfred Boa	6,423	15.9	+15.9
Communist	Eugene Marshall	882	2.2	+2.2
Independent	Isabel Longworth	570	1.4	+1.4
Total formal votes		40,309	97.6	
Informal votes		996	2.4	
Turnout		41,305	97.3	
Two-party-preferred result
Labor	Charles Griffiths		64.1	−12.0
Liberal	Harold Daisley		35.9	+12.0
Labor notional hold		Swing	−12.0	
