= Department of Housing and Construction =

Department of Housing and Construction may refer to:

- Department of Housing and Construction (1973–75), an Australian government department
- Department of Housing and Construction (1978–82), an Australian government department
- Department of Housing and Construction (1983–87), an Australian government department

== See also ==
- Department of Housing (disambiguation)
