= Department of Housing (disambiguation) =

Department of Housing may refer to:

- California Department of Housing and Community Development, a department within the California Business, Consumer Services and Housing Agency that develops housing policy and building codes
- Department of Housing, a former Australian government department )(1963-1973)
- Department of Housing and Construction (disambiguation)
  - Department of Housing and Construction (1973–75), an Australian government department
  - Department of Housing and Construction (1978–82), an Australian government department
  - Department of Housing and Construction (1983–87), an Australian government department
- Department of Housing and Public Works (version 2), a ministerial department within the Queensland Government
- Department of Housing and Regional Development, an Australian government department that existed between March 1994 and March 1996.
- Department of Housing and Urban Development (Iran)
- Department of Housing and Urban Development (Tamil Nadu), department of government of Tamil Nadu
- Department of Housing and Urban Planning, a department of government of Uttar Pradesh
- Department of Housing, Local Government and Heritage, a department of the government of Ireland
- Department of Housing (South Africa)
- Maryland Department of Housing and Community Development
- New York City Department of Housing Preservation and Development, a department of the government of Maryland
- NSW Department of Housing, was an agency responsible for the provision and management of public housing services in the state of New South Wales, Australia.
- Puerto Rico Department of Housing, department responsible for homeownership, affordable housing, and community assistance programs in Puerto Rico
- Texas Department of Housing and Community Affairs, agency responsible for homeownership, affordable rental housing, community and energy assistance programs, and colonia activities serving primarily low income Texans.
- United States Department of Housing and Urban Development, the executive department of the United States federal government that administers federal housing and urban development laws
