= Budgewoi Peninsula =

Budgewoi Peninsula Central Coast, New South Wales
- Coordinates: 33°12′54″S 151°35′06″E
- Postcode(s): 2262
- Elevation: 6 m (20 ft)
- Location: 18 km (11 mi) NNE of The Entrance; 22 km (14 mi) ENE of Wyong; 21 km (13 mi) SSW of Swansea; 47 km (29 mi) SSW of Newcastle; 117 km (73 mi) NNE of Sydney
- LGA(s): Central Coast Council
- Parish: Wallarah
- State electorate(s): Swansea
- Federal division(s): Shortland
Suburbs around Budgewoi Peninsula:
Lake Munmorah	Munmorah SCA
Halekulani	Budgewoi Peninsula	Pacific Ocean
Budgewoi	Budgewoi

Budgewoi Peninsula is a coastal suburb of the Central Coast region of New South Wales, Australia, on a narrow peninsula between Munmorah Lake and the Pacific Ocean. It is part of the Central Coast Council local government area.

Budgewoi Peninsula is unpopulated, with nearly all of its land area being part of the Munmorah State Conservation Area.
