= Australian Transport Safety Bureau =

National transport safety investigator in Australia

Agency overview
- Formed: 1 July 1999; 27 years ago
- Jurisdiction: Government of Australia
- Headquarters: 12 Moore Street, Canberra, ACT
- Employees: 100
- Agency executive: Angus Mitchell, Chief Commissioner
- Website: www.atsb.gov.au

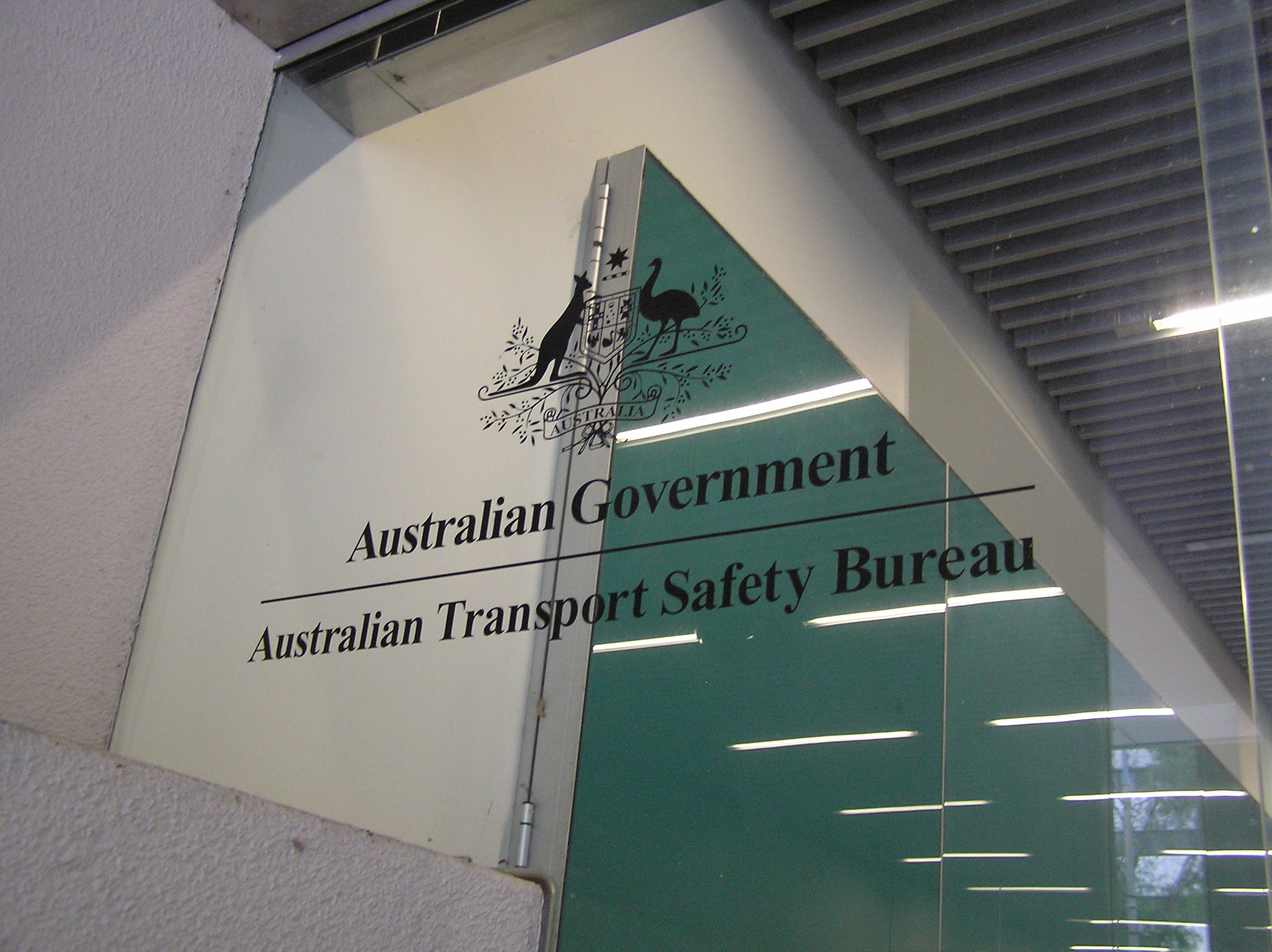
ATSB central office

The Australian Transport Safety Bureau (ATSB) is Australia's national transport safety investigator. The ATSB is the federal government body responsible for investigating transport-related accidents and incidents within Australia. It covers air, sea and rail travel. The ATSB is an independent Commonwealth Government statutory agency, governed by a Commission and is separate from transport regulators, policy makers and service providers.

== History ==
The ATSB was formed on 1 July 1999. It combined the Bureau of Air Safety Investigation (BASI), Marine Incident Investigation Unit (MIIU) and parts of the Federal Office of Road Safety (FORS).

Its central office is located at 12 Moore Street in Canberra, Australian Capital Territory. It has field offices in Melbourne, Brisbane, Sydney and Perth. It has about 100 employees, including about 60 Transport Safety Investigators of aviation, marine, and rail accidents and incidents.

=== Air safety investigation ===
Australian aviation accidents were initially investigated by the Air Accident Investigation Committee (AAIC), formed in 1927, to "investigate all civil and military aircraft accidents that the Committee deemed advisable". When the Department of Civil Aviation (DCA) was formed in 1938, investigation of air safety came within its purview. During the 1950s, the Air Safety Investigation Branch (ASIB) was formed, becoming the Bureau of Air Safety Investigation (BASI) in 1982, an operationally independent unit of the Department of Aviation (DoA). In 1987, BASI was transferred to the Department of Transport and Communications (DoTaC) when DoA was abolished.

Currently, the ATSB is responsible for investigating civil aircraft incidents and accidents within Australia and assisting in investigations of Australian registered aircraft overseas. Australia is a Council member of the International Civil Aviation Organization (ICAO).

=== Marine safety investigation ===
The Marine Incident Investigation Unit (MIIU) was created on 1 January 1991, under the direction of the Inspector of Marine Accidents, a statutory position. Previously, significant marine accident investigations were conducted by a Court of Marine Inquiry, a model which was adopted in 1921, via amendment to the Navigation Act 1912 (Cwlth). This was based on United Kingdom law and practices dating back to the 1850s.

Currently, the ATSB investigates accidents and serious incidents of Australian flagged ships worldwide, and of foreign flagged ships within Australian waters. Australia is a Council member of the International Maritime Organization (IMO).

=== Road Safety Branch ===
Between July 1999 and March 2008, Federal government initiatives dealing with road safety were primarily within the ATSB's responsibilities in the Road Safety Branch (RSB). The RSB later became part of 'The Infrastructure and Surface Transport Policy Division' of the Department of Infrastructure, Transport, Regional Development and Local Government.

=== Rail safety investigation ===
Until formation of the ATSB, rail safety had been the responsibility of each state government. With the enactment of the Transport Safety Investigation Act 2003 (Cwlth), the ATSB gained jurisdiction for rail incident and accident investigations on the Defined Interstate Rail Network (DIRN), consisting of the standard gauge track linking all major Australian mainland cities and ports. In December 2009, the Council of Australian Governments (COAG) agreed to adopt the ATSB as the national rail safety investigator, in conjunction with the formation of a national rail safety regulator. Commencing in January 2013, all Australian states and territories gradually adopted the scheme, with Queensland the last to join in July 2017. The Office of Transport Safety Investigations (OTSI) and the Chief Investigator Transport Safety (CITS) continue to investigate rail accidents and incidents in conjunction with the ATSB, in New South Wales and Victoria, respectively.

== ATSB operations ==
The ATSB contributes to transport safety by independently investigating, analysing and openly reporting on transport safety matters. It is not a function of the ATSB to apportion blame or liability, instead, investigations are focused on learning from accidents and incidents and, encouraging safety action by government and industry.

The ATSB is entirely separate from transport regulatory authorities such as the Civil Aviation Safety Authority (CASA), the Australian Maritime Safety Authority (AMSA) and the Office of the National Rail Safety Regulator (ONRSR), government policy makers and, service providers such as Airservices Australia and the Australian Rail Track Corporation (ARTC). This separation ensures the independence of ATSB investigations, thereby avoiding external influence and conflicts of interest.

The Transport Safety Investigation Act 2003 (TSI Act), allows the ATSB to investigate transport safety matters in the aviation, marine and rail transport modes within the Australian Government's constitutional jurisdiction and, to release transport safety information, including investigation reports that detail the findings and significant factors that led to a particular transport safety occurrence. ATSB Transport Safety Investigators exercise statutory powers delegated by the Chief Commissioner in accordance with the provisions of the TSI Act. These powers allow ATSB investigators to interview anyone involved directly or indirectly in a transport safety occurrence. A comprehensive regime of provisions within the TSI Act is in place to maintain the confidentiality of, and legal protection for, a range of sensitive safety information gathered by ATSB investigators. The ATSB is now so experienced in Aircraft crash investigations that they are now specifically called upon by the US NTSB and were a major contributor in the Adam Air 574 crash in Silowasi, Indonesia.
