= Collin Freeland =

Australian public servant (1933–2021)

Collin Freeland AO

Secretary of the Department of Housing and Construction
- In office 5 August 1980 – 7 May 1982

Secretary of the Department of Aviation
- In office 7 May 1982 – 10 February 1986

Secretary of the Department of Transport
- In office 10 February 1986 – 24 July 1987

Personal details
- Born: Colin William Martin Freeland; 31 January 1933
- Died: 10 April 2021 (aged 88)
- Occupation: Public servant

Collin William Martin Freeland, AO (31 January 1933 – 10 April 2021) was an Australian public servant and policymaker. He is best known for his time heading the Department of Aviation and the Department of Transport in the 1980s.

== Life and career ==
Collin Freeland was born on 31 January 1933. He was awarded a Bachelor of Engineering, and moved to Canberra in 1969.

In August 1980, Collin was appointed to his first Secretary job, as head of the Department of Housing and Construction.

In May 1982, Collin was appointed Secretary of the Department of Aviation. In February 1986 he was transferred to head the Department of Transport. When departments of the Australian Government were restructured in 1987, he was appointed an Associate Secretary of the Department of Transport and Communications.

Between 1988 and 1990, Collin was chief executive and managing director of the Civil Aviation Authority.

In September 1992, Collin was appointed Chairman of the National Road Trauma Advisory Council. Collin died on 10 April 2021, at the age of 88.

== Awards ==
Freeland was appointed an Officer of the Order of Australia in June 1988 in recognition of his public service.

Government offices
Preceded by George Warwick Smith	Secretary of the Department of Housing and Construction; 1980 – 1982	Succeeded by Rae Taylor as Secretary of the Department of Transport and Construction
Preceded by Charles Halton as Secretary of the Department of Transport	Secretary of the Department of Aviation; 1982 – 1986	Succeeded by Rae Taylor
Preceded by Rae Taylor	Secretary of the Department of Transport; 1986 – 1987	Succeeded by Peter Wilenski as Secretary of the Department of Transport and Communications
