= Buff Point =

- Suburb
- /0/queryThe property query is required; /0/idsThe property ids is required; /0Failed to match at least one schema; /0/titleThe property title is required; /0/serviceThe property service is required; /0Failed to match exactly one schema; /0/geometriesThe property geometries is required; /0/typeDoes not have a value in the enumeration ["GeometryCollection"]; /0/typeDoes not have a value in the enumeration ["MultiPolygon"]; /0/typeDoes not have a value in the enumeration ["Point"]; /0/typeDoes not have a value in the enumeration ["MultiPoint"]; /0/typeDoes not have a value in the enumeration ["LineString"]; /0/typeDoes not have a value in the enumeration ["MultiLineString"]; /0/typeDoes not have a value in the enumeration ["Polygon"]; /0/coordinatesThe property coordinates is required; /0/geometryThe property geometry is required; /0/typeDoes not have a value in the enumeration ["Feature"]; /0/featuresThe property features is required; /0/typeDoes not have a value in the enumeration ["FeatureCollection"]
- Coordinates: 33°13′55″S 151°32′6″E
- Country: Australia
- State: New South Wales
- City: Central Coast
- LGA: Central Coast Council
- Location: 19 km (12 mi) NE of Wyong

Government
  - State electorate: Swansea
  - Federal division: Shortland

Area
  - Total: 2.1 km^{2} (0.81 sq mi)
- Postcode: 2262
- Parish: Munmorah
Suburbs around Buff Point
| San Remo | Colongra | Halekulani |
| | Buff Point | Budgewoi |
| | Budgewoi Lake |

Buff Point is a suburb of the Central Coast region of New South Wales, Australia. It is part of the Central Coast Council local government area.
