= Milton Orkopoulos =

Australian former state politician and sex offender

- Born: 22 July 1957 (age 69)
- Occupation: Former politician
- Children: 3
- Status: Jailed
- Convictions: Child sex offences Drug offences
- Penalty: 13 years 9 months (eligible for parole after 9 year 3 months); 20 years (eligible for parole after 10 years)

Milton Orkopoulos

Member of the New South Wales Parliament for Swansea
- In office 27 March 1999 – 13 November 2006
- Preceded by: Jill Hall
- Succeeded by: Robert Coombs

Personal details
- Party: Labor (formerly, expelled in 2006)

Milton Orkopoulos (born 22 July 1957) is an Australian convicted sex offender and former politician. A member of the New South Wales Legislative Assembly from 1999 to 2006, Orkopoulos was appointed Minister for Aboriginal Affairs and Minister Assisting the Premier on Citizenship in August 2005.

In November 2006, Premier of New South Wales Morris Iemma sacked Orkopoulos as a Minister and expelled him from the Australian Labor Party after he was charged with child sex and other offences. The following week, he resigned as MP for the state electorate of Swansea. On 14 March 2008, Orkopoulos was convicted on charges relating to child sex offences and the supply of drugs. In May 2008, he was sentenced to 13 years 9 months in jail. He was paroled in December 2019, but was re-detained in January 2020 after failing to comply with his parole conditions. Orkopoulos was sentenced to a further 20 years in jail in November 2023, after being charged with sexually abusing and supplying drugs to four other young children.

== Early life ==
Orkopoulos, an Australian of Greek descent briefly trained as a nurse before studying arts at the University of Newcastle, though he did not graduate. He went on to work for BHP and as an electorate officer for MPs Peter Morris, Don Bowman and Jill Hall. He was married with three children.

== Political career ==
From 1995 until 1999, Orkopoulos represented the ALP on Lake Macquarie City Council. In March 1999, he was elected to represent Swansea in the Legislative Assembly for Labor, and joined the Socialist Left faction. In August 2005, he was promoted to the front bench, serving in the low-profile portfolios of Aboriginal Affairs and Citizenship.

Former NSW Premier, Nathan Rees, served as his Chief of Staff before joining the staff of Premier Morris Iemma in 2006.

== Criminal history ==
On 5 November 2006, police minister John Watkins was informed by police commissioner Ken Moroney that Orkopoulos was about to be charged with child sex offences. Moroney later explained that the Orkopoulos case "is an issue that would be discussed in the normal course of events between us." The call, which resulted in the premier's office knowing that the arrest of a senior colleague was imminent, raised questions as to the political independence of the New South Wales Police. Legal commentator Richard Ackland wrote in the Sydney Morning Herald that "I can't think of a solid reason why third parties should be told by the police that they are about to nab someone important."

On 7 November 2006, Orkopoulos was arrested and charged with 30 offences including involvement in child prostitution, sexual assault and supplying illegal drugs. He was charged, among other things, with assaulting two underage boys and a third young male, and using taxpayers' money to pay a teenage boy to have sex with him.

Premier Morris Iemma immediately sacked him from Cabinet, and he was also expelled from the Labor Party. Orkopoulos denied the charges but indicated that he would not contest his Swansea electorate at the 2007 state election. He resigned from parliament on 13 November 2006 and reportedly attempted suicide the next day.

The government also passed legislation to suspend or remove parliamentary pension entitlements for any member who resigns when charged with serious crimes prior to the resolution of charges. The provisions of the legislation permitted it to be applied retrospectively to Orkopoulos.

Further charges were laid against Orkopoulos on 16 April 2007. On 14 March 2008, he was found guilty of 28 offences relating to sexual assault of a minor, indecent assault and supplying heroin and cannabis. On 21 May 2008, Orkopoulos was sentenced to 13 years and 11 months in jail, with a non-parole period of 9 years and 3 months. In March 2009, he lodged a challenge against his conviction in the New South Wales Court of Criminal Appeal. On 25 August 2009, the NSW Court of Criminal Appeal rejected Orkopoulos' appeal against his conviction but reduced his maximum sentence to 13 years and eight months (instead of the 13 years and 11 months sentence by the trial court) with a non-parole period of nine years.

In January 2017, Orkopoulos' application for parole was refused on the grounds that he had failed to attend rehabilitation.

He was released on parole in late December 2019. The conditions of his release included being electronically monitored and not approaching his victims. In January 2020, while on parole, Orkopoulos was charged with two counts of failing to meet his reporting obligations. He pleaded guilty to those offences and avoided a prison term when his lawyer, Omar Juweinat pointed out an anomaly in the sentencing laws.

On 15 June 2020, Orkopoulos was arrested and questioned by NSW Police over further historical sex offence allegations. He was charged with a further 28 offences from the period 1993 to 2003, standing trial in March 2023. In April 2023, a jury found Orkopoulos guilty of 26 offences, and he was sentenced to a further 20 years in jail in November that year. He will be eligible for parole on 14 June 2033.

== Personal life ==
Orkopoulos married his wife Kathy in December 1994. The couple had three children, including two children from Kathy's previous marriage. In March 2008, it was reported that he and Kathy's marriage had "collapsed" due to his conviction for child sex offences. In June 2023, he was attacked by another inmate in Long Bay jail and taken to hospital with head, body and leg injuries.

== See also ==
- Child sexual abuse in Australia
- List of Australian criminals

New South Wales Legislative Assembly
Preceded by Jill Hall	Member for Swansea; 1999–2006	Succeeded by Robert Coombs
