= Halekulani =

Halekulani has several uses including:

- Halekulani, New South Wales
- Halekulani hotel
- Halekulani, a villain in Bobobo-bo Bo-bobo
