= Department of Transport (1972–1982) =

Australian government department, 1972–1982

Department overview
- Formed: 19 December 1972
- Preceding Department: Department of Shipping and Transport Department of Civil Aviation
- Dissolved: 7 May 1982
- Superseding Department: Department of Transport and Construction Department of Aviation
- Jurisdiction: Commonwealth of Australia
- Ministers responsible: Charles Jones, Minister (1972–1975); Peter Nixon, Minister (1975–1979); Ralph Hunt, Minister (1979–1982)
- Department executives: Malcolm Macgregor Summers, Secretary (Jan 1973 – Sep 1973); Charles Halton, Secretary (Nov 1973 – May 1982)

The Department of Transport was an Australian government department that existed between December 1972 and May 1982. It was the third so-named Australian government department to be established.

== Scope ==
Information about the department's functions and government funding allocation could be found in the Administrative Arrangements Orders, the annual Portfolio Budget Statements and in the department's annual reports.

According to the Administrative Arrangements Order made on 20 December 1972, the department dealt with:

- Navigation and shipping
- Lighthouses, lightships, beacons and buoys
- Land transport

== Structure ==
The department was an Australian Public Service department, staffed by officials who were responsible to the minister for transport.
