= Department of Transport (1983–1987) =

Australian government department, 1983–1987

Department overview
- Formed: 11 March 1983
- Preceding Department: Department of Transport and Construction
- Dissolved: 24 July 1987
- Superseding Department: Department of Transport and Communications
- Jurisdiction: Commonwealth of Australia
- Minister responsible: Peter Morris, Minister
- Department executives: Rae Taylor, Secretary (1983–1986); Collin Freeland, Secretary (1986–1987)

The Department of Transport was an Australian government department that existed between March 1983 and July 1987. It was announced by Prime Minister Bob Hawke as a new agency on his first day in the leadership position. The former Department of Transport and Construction was split into two departments, reconstituting the separate Department of Housing and Construction so as "to provide a focus for policies affecting the housing and building industries".

According to the Administrative Arrangements Order made on 11 March 1983, the department dealt with:

- Shipping and marine navigation (including lighthouses, lightships, beacons and buoys)
- Land transport

== Structure ==
The department was an Australian Public Service department responsible to the Minister for Transport, Peter Morris. Department officials were headed by a Secretary, initially Rae Taylor (until February 1986), then Colin Freeland.
