= Budgewoi =

- Town
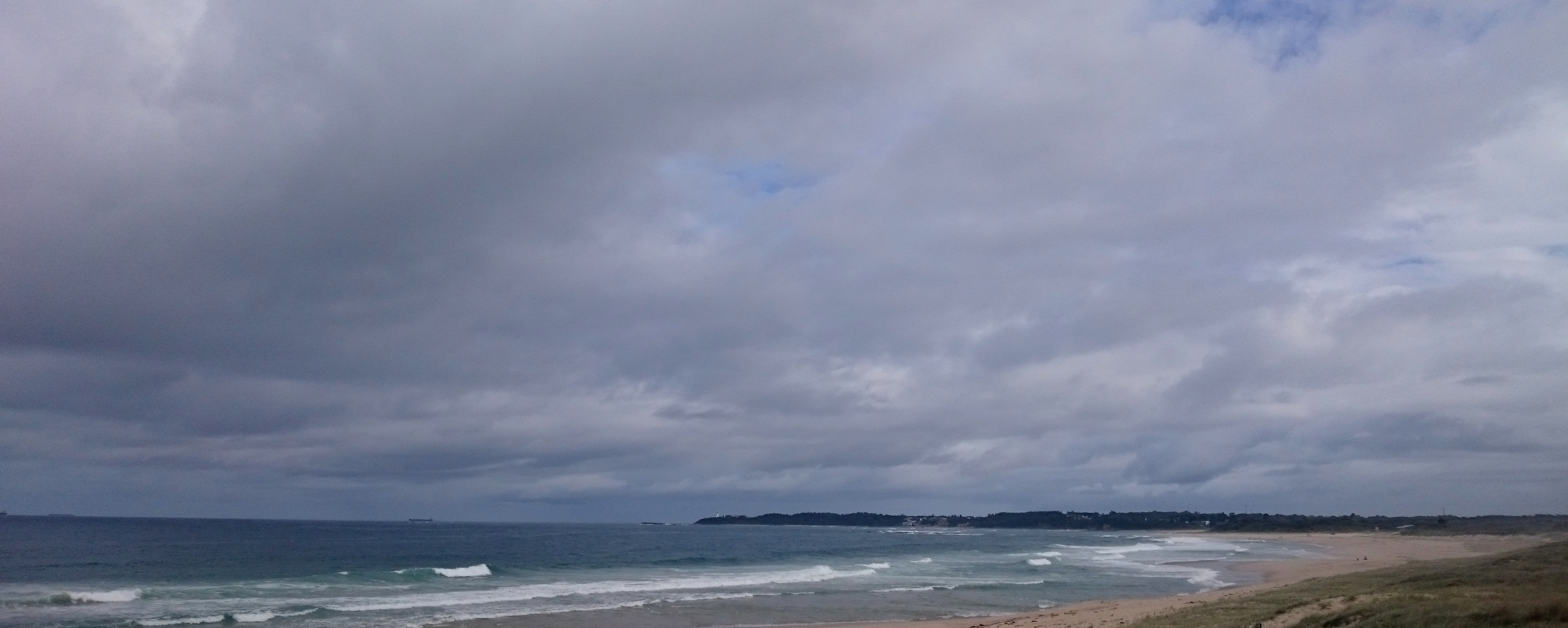
- Budgewoi Beach

- Coordinates: 33°14′02″S 151°33′25″E
- Country: Australia
- State: New South Wales
- City: Central Coast
- LGA: Central Coast Council
- Location: 15 km (9.3 mi) NNE of The Entrance; 20 km (12 mi) ENE of Wyong; 49 km (30 mi) SSW of Newcastle; 44 km (27 mi) NNE of Gosford; 114 km (71 mi) NNE of Sydney
- Established: 1941

Government
  - State electorate: Swansea
  - Federal division: Shortland
- Elevation: 3 m (9.8 ft)

Population
  - Total: 3,497 (SAL 2021)
- Postcode: 2262
Localities around Budgewoi
Halekulani	Lake Munmorah	Budgewoi Peninsula
Colongra	Budgewoi	Pacific Ocean
Buff Point	Budgewoi Lake	Toukley

Budgewoi (/bʌdʒəwɔɪ/ BUDGE-ə-woy) is a coastal town that is located on the Central Coast of New South Wales, Australia. Budgewoi is situated on two peninsulas that is split by the Budgewoi Lake. The town is located about 114 km northeast of Sydney. It is part of the Central Coast Council local government area.

Much of the town is surrounded by water; Lake Munmorah, Budgewoi Lake and the Pacific Ocean. Budgewoi is an ideal spot for water enthusiasts. Coles opened its doors in 2005 expanding the central business area and drawing businesses and consumers to the area. It is a relatively quiet, coastal town.

== Name ==
Some sources give the original name as Pudgeway (Aboriginal term for young grass) but this is open to conjecture with local historian (Bruce Russell, "From Pudgeway to Budgewoi", 1984) stating the aboriginal name for the area as Budjeri, which meant "good conditions" and described the abundance of wallabies, birds, fish, prawns, trees, shrubs and plants they could use to sustain a healthy tribe. The early colonists named the area Pudgeway but over the years it has been known by many other names: Budgeway, Possum's Fence, Sinking, Sandy Point, Halekulani and the present name of Budgewoi which was made official in July 1978. Another source says Budgewoi is an Aboriginal term for "Where the Waters Meet" and this describes the landscape. A news article from The Sun on 14 September 1923 describes "Budgewoi" as aboriginal for "Good Fishing"

== History ==
In 1827, John Slade offered grant of 640 acres (2.6 km^{2}) but appears not to have taken up the offer. On 11 August 1843, Robert Henderson was granted 640 acres (2.6 km^{2}). He established a dairy farm on the property, supplying milk, meat and cheese to the growing settlement at Gosford as well as the Dove Inn in Sydney, which he also owned. He named the property "Budgewoi".

In 1856, Henderson sold the dairy farm and two parcels of land in Bungaree Norah to his close friend Edward Hargraves for the sum of $1000, reportedly part of Hargraves' prize money from the NSW Government for the discovery of gold at Ophir. Hargraves then built "Noraville". Wollombi Aboriginal Tribe members are known to have worked on the property. Some sources state that Hargraves "befriended" tribe members. Cattle were grazed as far as Buff Point and Elizabeth Bay.

Norah Head lighthouse built and opened in 1903 after vessel wreckages.

Originally used for grazing cattle and agriculture, by the early 1930s Budgewoi was becoming known as a holiday destination and families would come from Sydney to camp over weekends and during holidays. However, getting to the area was not easy so it did not become as popular as other places on the Central Coast.

=== Surrounding areas ===
Chinese fishermen worked the Tuggerah Lakes area in the late 1850s, in particular, what is now known as Canton Beach at Toukley. While not confirmed, it is believed this is where the name is derived from. It was a base for catching and curing fish that were then shipped to Queensland, the goldfields and back to China.

1889 saw the opening of the railway from Sydney to Newcastle and Wyong turning into a proper township with the opening of the Royal Hotel and the first post office established. The railway was the making of the timber industry. In its hey day, around the turn of the century, Wyong exported thousands of railway sleepers. In 1904 the Lighthouse at Norah Head was built and the first few houses began to appear at The Entrance. Already early tourists were making the trip to Tuggerah Lakes – by boat, horse-drawn vehicle and train. They went mainly for the fishing and the long bracing walks along the beaches. Slowly, but surely, the population of the Shire grew. Roads, bridges and boarding houses were built. After the war, the Central Coast came of age. The event was marked by the creation of a New Shire, Wyong, out of the old Erina Shire in 1947.

=== Schools ===
The Budgewoi Public School was built in 1961, the first headmaster being Mr R. Passlow. He had a staff of five and about 150 pupils in the original block on the corner of Woolana and Lukela avenues. The official record of the school states that a teacher was appointed in January 1960 and the first class started in February 1960. It is possible that these pupils were taught at the Budgewoi Hall, the only one available at the time. The alternative would have been a home or a marquee.

With no high school located in the town, it has always been necessary for students to be bused to schools in the surrounding area; this was Wyong High School until the opening of Gorokan High School in 1976 and to Northlakes High School since its opening in 1981.

=== Churches ===
St John's Budgewoi had Church of England services held fortnightly in the community hall during the 1950s and 1960s. The Budgewoi Ladies Guild was formed to buy a block of land, which was purchased for $423. In December 1971 St John the Evangelist Budgewoi was dedicated and 20 people attended and worshipped. In 2006 church buildings were in need of refurbishment and upgrading to meet the requirements of Wyong Shire Council and due to the short notice given by Council and the significant funds needed the Parish Council reluctantly agreed that it had no option but to close the church for public worship. The final service was held in St John's Church Budgewoi on 10 September 2006 and it was formally closed by the Assistant Bishop of Newcastle, Graeme Rutherford, on that day.

== Notable residents ==
- David Hall – Paralympian
- David Robinson-Smith – Australian filmmaker who grew up in Budgewoi, Mannering Park, and San Remo.
- Short Stack – Pop Punk band consisting of Shaun Diviney, Andy Clemmensen and Bradie Webb.
