= Ralph Hunt (Australian politician) =

Australian politician (1928–2011)

The Honourable Ralph Hunt AO
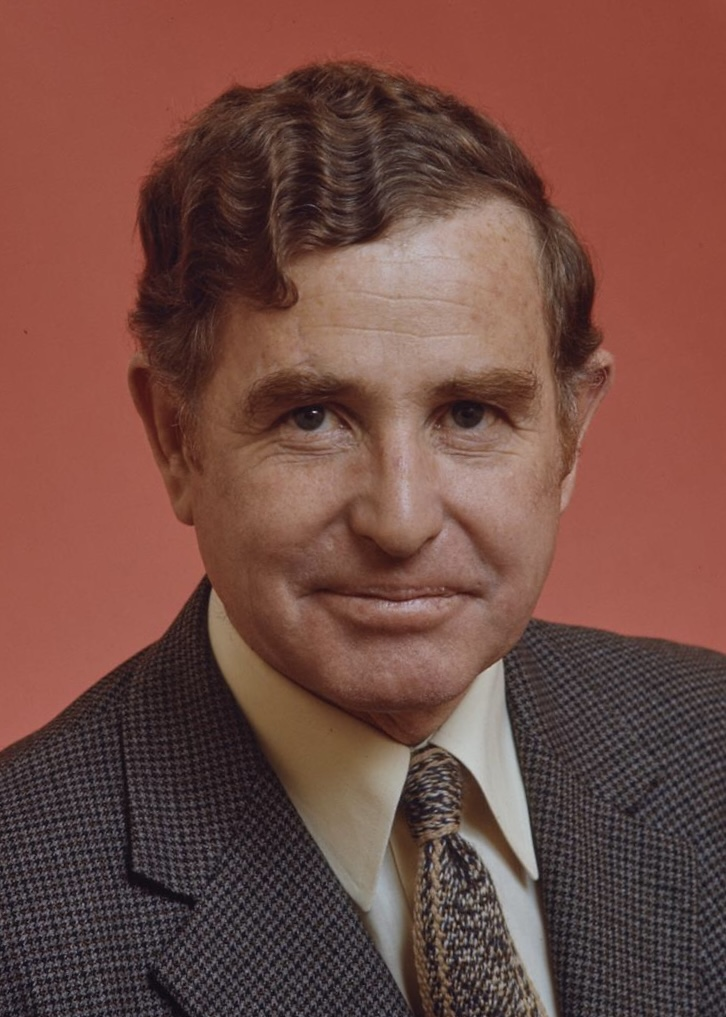
- Hunt in 1974

Deputy Leader of the National Party
- In office 17 January 1984 – 23 July 1987
- Leader: Ian Sinclair
- Preceded by: Ian Sinclair
- Succeeded by: Bruce Lloyd

Minister for Transport
- In office 8 December 1979 – 11 March 1983
- Prime Minister: Malcolm Fraser
- Preceded by: Peter Nixon
- Succeeded by: Peter Morris

Minister for Health
- In office 22 December 1975 – 8 December 1979
- Prime Minister: Malcolm Fraser
- Preceded by: Don Chipp
- Succeeded by: Michael MacKellar

Minister for the Interior
- In office 5 February 1971 – 5 December 1972
- Prime Minister: John Gorton; William McMahon
- Preceded by: Peter Nixon
- Succeeded by: Kep Enderby

Member of the Australian Parliament for Gwydir
- In office 7 June 1969 – 24 February 1989
- Preceded by: Ian Allan
- Succeeded by: John Anderson

Personal details
- Born: Ralph James Dunnet Hunt; 31 March 1928 Narrabri, New South Wales
- Died: 22 May 2011 (aged 83) Sydney, New South Wales
- Party: National Party of Australia
- Other political affiliations: Liberal (before 1947)
- Spouse: Miriam McMahon
- Children: 3
- Occupation: Grazier

Ralph James Dunnet Hunt AO (31 March 1928 – 22 May 2011) was an Australian politician. He was a member of the National Party and served as the party's deputy leader from 1984 to 1987, under Ian Sinclair. He was a senior minister in Coalition governments, serving as Minister for the Interior (1971–1972), Health (1975–1979), and Transport (1979–1982), and Transport and Construction (1982–1983). He represented the New South Wales seat of Gwydir in the House of Representatives from 1969 to 1989.

== Early life ==
Hunt was born in Narrabri, New South Wales to an established farming and grazing family, which traditions he continued after completing his schooling at The Scots College, Sydney. His mother's family, the Dunnetts, owned the North Western Courier newspaper. He was a councillor of Boomi Shire Council from 1956 to 1968 and vice-president from 1962 to 1968.

== Politics ==
He won the seat of Gwydir in the Australian Parliament for the Country Party at a by-election in June 1969 following the resignation of Ian Allan. He was appointed Minister for the Interior in the Second Gorton Ministry in February 1971 and retained that position in the McMahon Ministry until the defeat of the government at the 1972 election.

Following the Liberal-National Country Party Coalition's win at the 1975 election, Malcolm Fraser appointed him Minister for Health. He was responsible for introducing Medibank Mark II. In December 1979, Fraser appointed Hunt Minister for Transport. His portfolio became Transport and Construction in April 1982, but the coalition government was defeated at the 1983 election.

He had returned to the backbench in preparation for retirement; but when Doug Anthony resigned in 1984, Hunt was persuaded to return to the front bench and was elected Deputy Leader of the National Party to Ian Sinclair, holding the position from 1984 to 1987. He became shadow minister for primary industries, and resigned from Parliament in February 1989.

== Personal life ==
He was made an Officer of the Order of Australia in January 1990.

Ralph Hunt died in Sydney on 22 May 2011, aged 83. He was survived by his wife Miriam (Mim) née McMahon, whom he married in 1953; and three children.

== Notes ==
Political offices
Preceded by Peter Nixon	Minister for the Interior; 1971–1972	Succeeded by Keppel Enderby
Preceded by Don Chipp	Minister for Health; 1975–1979	Succeeded by Michael MacKellar
Preceded by Peter Nixon (transport); Tom McVeigh (construction)	Minister for Transport; 1979–1982	Succeeded by Peter Morris (transport); Chris Hurford (construction)
Preceded by Peter Nixon (transport); Tom McVeigh (construction)	Minister for Transport and Construction; 1982–1983	Succeeded by Peter Morris (transport); Chris Hurford (construction)
Parliament of Australia
Preceded by Ian Allan	Member for Gwydir; 1969–1989	Succeeded by John Anderson
Party political offices
Preceded by William Moss	Federal President of the Country Party; 1968–1969	Succeeded by Sidney Roberts
Preceded by Ian Sinclair	Deputy Leader of the National Party of Australia; 1984–1987	Succeeded by Bruce Lloyd
