= Rae Taylor =

Australian public servant

Rae Taylor AO

Secretary of the Department of Employment and Youth Affairs
- In office 13 December 1978 – 7 May 1982

Secretary of the Department of Transport and Construction
- In office 7 May 1982 – 11 March 1983

Acting Secretary of the Department of Housing and Construction
- In office 11 March 1983 – 2 May 1983

Secretary of the Department of Transport
- In office 11 March 1983 – 10 February 1986

Secretary of the Department of Aviation
- In office 10 February 1986 – 24 July 1987

Secretary of the Department of Industrial Relations
- In office 24 July 1987 – 1 March 1989

Personal details
- Born: Rae Martin Taylor; 1935 (age 90–91)
- Education: University of Sydney (BEc)
- Occupation: Public servant

Rae Martin Taylor AO (born 1935) is a retired senior Australian public servant and policymaker.

== Education ==
Taylor is a University of Sydney graduate, with a bachelor's degree in Economics (with honours).

== Career ==
Rae Taylor joined the Commonwealth Public Service at the Commonwealth Bureau of Census and Statistics in 1956. He subsequently was employed in the Department of Primary Industry, the Department of Trade and Industry, the Department of Territories and the Department of Housing. In 1969 Taylor joined the Department of Shipping and Transport, becoming a Deputy Secretary of the Department in 1975.

Taylor was appointed to his first Secretary role in December 1978, becoming head of the Department of Employment and Youth Affairs.

In May 1982, Taylor was shifted to a position as head of the Department of Transport and Construction. After the Hawke government was elected in the 1983 federal election, Taylor was retained in only an acting role overseeing Commonwealth construction functions, becoming Acting Secretary of the Department of Housing and Construction. and Secretary of the Department of Transport.

Between February 1986 and July 1987, Taylor was Secretary of the Department of Aviation.

Taylor's final Secretary appointment was as head of the Department of Industrial Relations between July 1987 and March 1989.

In 1994, Taylor was appointed Board Chairman of the National Centre for Vocational Education Research Ltd.

In 1999 he was appointed Chairman of a steering group to oversee the second stage review of the Commonwealth Navigation Act.

== Awards ==
Taylor was made an Officer of the Order of Australia in January 1987 for his public service.

Government offices
Preceded by Brian Tregillis	Secretary of the Department of Employment and Youth Affairs; 1978 – 1982	Succeeded by Mike Codd as Secretary of the Department of Employment and Industrial Relations
Preceded by Charles Halton as Secretary of the Department of Transport	Secretary of the Department of Transport and Construction; 1982 – 1983	Succeeded by Himself as Secretary of the Department of Housing and Construction (Acting)
Preceded by Collin Freeland as Secretary of the Department of Housing and Construction	Secretary of the Department of Transport and Construction; 1982 – 1983	Succeeded by Himself as Secretary of the Department of Transport
Preceded by Himself as Secretary of the Department of Transport and Construction	Acting Secretary of the Department of Housing and Construction; 1983	Succeeded by Tony Blunn
Preceded by Himself as Secretary of the Department of Transport and Construction	Secretary of the Department of Transport; 1983 – 1986	Succeeded by Collin Freeland
Preceded by Collin Freeland	Secretary of the Department of Aviation; 1986 – 1987	Succeeded by Peter Wilenski as Secretary of the Department of Transport and Communications
Preceded by Ed Visbord as Secretary of the Department of Employment and Industrial Relations	Secretary of the Department of Industrial Relations; 1987 – 1989	Succeeded by Graham Glenn
