= Department of Transport and Construction =

Australian government department, 1982–1983

Department overview
- Formed: 7 May 1982
- Preceding Department: Department of Transport (III) Department of Housing and Construction (II)
- Dissolved: 11 March 1983
- Superseding Department: Department of Housing and Construction (III) Department of Transport (IV)
- Jurisdiction: Commonwealth of Australia
- Minister responsible: Ralph Hunt, Minister for Transport and Construction
- Department executive: Rae Taylor, Secretary

The Department of Transport and Construction was an Australian government department that existed between May 1982 and March 1983. It was announced by Prime Minister Malcolm Fraser to "carry out functions relating to road, rail and sea transport and assume responsibility for the Commonwealth construction activities of the (abolished) Department of Housing and Construction."

According to the Administrative Arrangements Order made on 15 December 1993, the Department dealt with:

- Shipping and marine navigation (including lighthouses, lightships, beacons and buoys)
- Land transport
- Planning, execution and maintenance of Commonwealth Government works
- Design and maintenance of furniture, furnishings and fittings for the Commonwealth Government.

== Structure ==
The Department was an Australian Public Service department responsible to the Minister for Transport and Construction, Ralph Hunt. Department officials were headed by a Secretary, Rae Taylor.
