= Halekulani, New South Wales =

Halekulani
- Suburb
- Interactive map of Halekulani
- Coordinates: 33°13′08″S 151°33′04″E
- Country: Australia
- State: New South Wales
- City: Central Coast
- LGA: Central Coast Council
- Location: 18 km (11 mi) NNE of The Entrance; 21 km (13 mi) NE of Wyong; 52 km (32 mi) SSW of Newcastle; 42 km (26 mi) NNE of Gosford; 119 km (74 mi) NNE of Sydney

Government
  - State electorate: Swansea
  - Federal division: Shortland

Area
  - Total: 1.5 km^{2} (0.58 sq mi)
- Elevation: 17 m (56 ft)

Population
  - Total: 2,427 (2011 census)
  - Density: 1,620/km^{2} (4,190/sq mi)
- Postcode: 2262
- Parish: Wallarah
Suburbs around Halekulani
Colongra		Lake Munmorah
Colongra	Halekulani
Buff Point	Budgewoi	Budgewoi

Halekulani is a suburb of the Central Coast region of New South Wales, Australia. It is part of the Central Coast Council local government area. Its name is a Hawaiian word meaning "house befitting heaven".

The name was given by Mr Wilmore of Wilmore & Randell, who called it Halekulani Estate after a "hotel in Hawaii in which he had been a guest". It was gazetted officially in 1991.
