= Department of Aviation (Australia) =

Australian Government department, 1982–1987

Department overview
- Formed: 7 May 1982; 44 years ago
- Preceding Department: Department of Transport (III)
- Dissolved: 24 July 1987; 39 years ago
- Superseding Department: Department of Transport and Communications Civil Aviation Authority
- Jurisdiction: Commonwealth of Australia
- Headquarters: Canberra City
- Ministers responsible: Wal Fife, Minister for Aviation (1982–1983); Kim Beazley, Minister for Aviation (1983–1984); Peter Morris, Minister for Aviation (1984–1987)
- Department executives: Collin Freeland, Secretary (1982–1986); Rae Taylor, Secretary (1986–1987)

The Department of Aviation was an Australian government department that existed between May 1982 and July 1987.

The Department of Aviation was announced by Prime Minister Malcolm Fraser as a new agency in 1982. At the time Fraser said that "the re-establishment of an Aviation Department recognises the importance of civil aviation to the economy and to the community at large. It is a distinct area which presents particular issues of its own and its importance warrants individual ministerial attention."

== Scope ==
Information about the department's functions and government funding allocation could be found in the Administrative Arrangements Orders, the annual Portfolio Budget Statements and in the department's annual reports.

The department was responsible for civil and air navigation functions, inherited from the Department of Transport (III).

== Structure ==
The department was an Australian Public Service department, staffed by officials who were responsible to the Minister for Aviation.
