= Charles Griffiths (politician) =

Australian politician

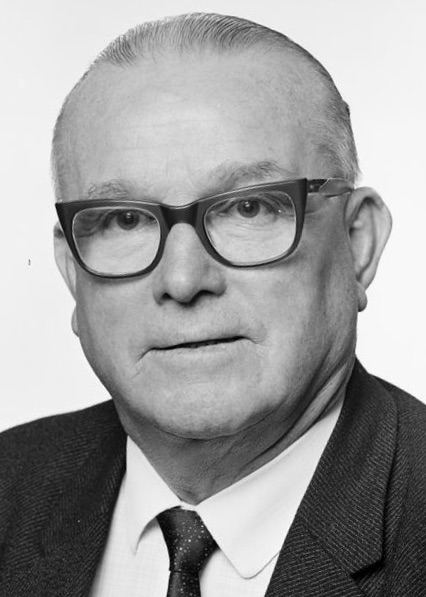

Member of the Australian Parliament for Shortland
- In office 10 December 1949 – 2 November 1972
- Preceded by: New seat
- Succeeded by: Peter Morris

Personal details
- Born: 26 June 1903 Jesmond, New South Wales, Australia
- Died: 17 May 1982 (aged 78) Belrose, New South Wales, Australia
- Party: Australian Labor Party
- Occupation: Railwayman

Charles Edward Griffiths (26 June 1903 – 17 May 1982) was an Australian politician. Born in Jesmond, New South Wales, he attended public schools and became a railwayman with New South Wales Railways, rising to become an official in the Australian Railways Union. He was appointed to the Australian Labor Party's New South Wales Executive before his election to the Australian House of Representatives in 1949 as the member for the new seat of Shortland. He held the seat until his retirement in 1972. Griffiths' 23 years as a member of federal parliament coincided with Labor's longest stint out of office.

Griffiths was married to his wife, Jess. He died on 17 May 1982.

Parliament of Australia
New seat	Member for Shortland; 1949–1972	Succeeded by Peter Morris
