= Peter Morris (politician) =

Australian politician (1932–2026)

The Honourable Peter Morris OAM
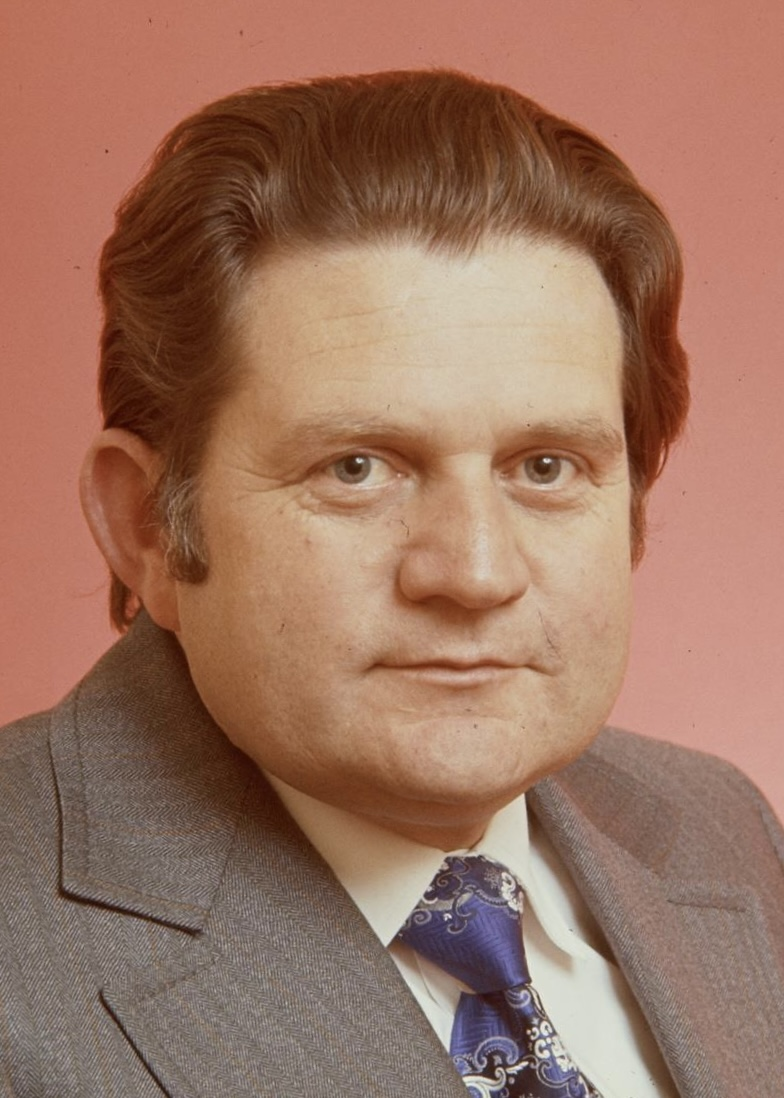
- Morris in 1974

Minister for Transport
- In office 11 March 1983 – 24 July 1987
- Prime Minister: Bob Hawke
- Preceded by: Ralph Hunt (as Minister for Transport and Construction)
- Succeeded by: Gareth Evans

Member of the Australian Parliament for Shortland
- In office 2 December 1972 – 31 August 1998
- Preceded by: Charles Griffiths
- Succeeded by: Jill Hall

Personal details
- Born: 29 July 1932 Sydney, New South Wales, Australia
- Died: 26 April 2026 (aged 93)
- Party: Labor
- Relations: Allan Morris (brother); Matthew Morris (son)
- Occupation: Politician

Peter Frederick Morris OAM (29 July 1932 – 26 April 2026) was an Australian politician. He held senior ministerial office in the Hawke government, serving as Minister for Transport (1983–1987), Aviation (1984–1987), Resources (1987–1988), Transport and Communications Support (1988), and Industrial Relations (1988–1990). He was a member of the House of Representatives from 1972 to 1998, representing the seat of Shortland for the Australian Labor Party (ALP). His brother Allan and son Matthew were also members of parliament.

== Early life ==
Peter Frederick Morris was born in Sydney on 29 July 1932. He and his younger brother Allan Morris – also a federal MP – were the sons of Jimmy Morris, a Greek immigrant from the island of Symi who anglicised his name from Agapitos Montiadis and ran a coffeehouse in Newcastle, New South Wales.

He attended Lake Munmorah Public School and Newcastle Boys' High School. After leaving school he joined the Bureau of Statistics and lived in Canberra for 18 months. He returned to Newcastle in 1954 and joined PJ Bearings as a paymaster. His position was made redundant after PJ Bearings was acquired by Repco and he subsequently went into business with his father as proprietor of a health food store.

== Politics ==
=== Early years ===
Morris was an alderman on the Newcastle City Council from 1968 to 1974. He served on the ALP's federal electorate council for the seat of Newcastle from 1965 to 1969 and was secretary of the party's Adamstown branch from 1970 to 1973.

In May 1972, Morris won ALP preselection for the House of Representatives seat of Shortland. The preselection process was controversial and included the unwilling withdrawal of the incumbent ALP MP Charles Griffiths and intervention from the federal executive to overturn three previous ballots. Morris retained Shortland for the ALP at the 1972 federal election. In 1975, he sued federal Liberal MP Bill Wentworth for libel, after Wentworth made allegations that Morris had engaged in bribery during the preselection process. The case was settled out of court on undisclosed terms.

He was appointed the ALP spokesman on transport in 1976, holding that role under opposition leaders Gough Whitlam, Bill Hayden, and Bob Hawke. He was a leading parliamentary critic of the Fraser government, tabling nearly twice as many questions on notice as any other Labor MP during the 1977–1980 parliamentary term. In 1983, Canberra Times columnist Ian Warden wrote that "in opposition he was quite wild and intractable, regularly bouncing to his feet and exploding with righteous indignation".

=== Government minister ===
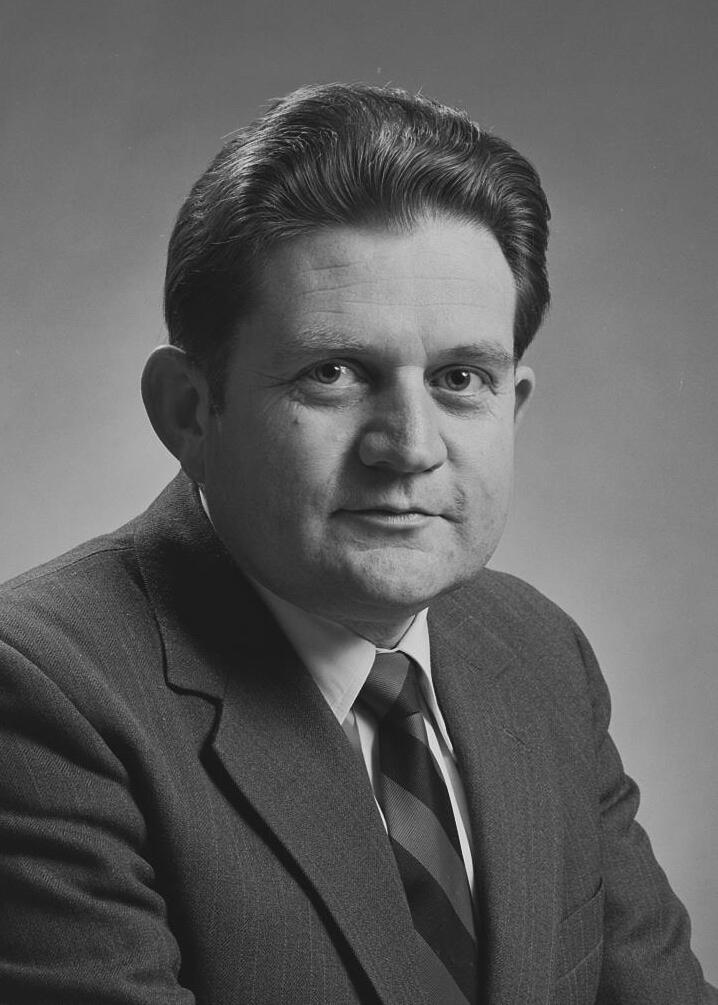
Morris in 1973

Morris was appointed Minister for Transport in the first Hawke Ministry in March 1983. In December 1984, he assumed the additional portfolio of aviation. In 1987, he became Minister for Resources and then was briefly Minister for Housing and Aged Care in early 1988. In February 1988, he became Minister for Transport and Communications Support, but was appointed to Cabinet as Minister for Industrial Relations in September 1988. After the 1990 election he was not re-elected to the ministry, due to the formalisation of Labor's faction system and the fact that he did not belong to a faction; he spent the rest of his career in federal politics on the backbench.

=== Return to backbench ===
After leaving the ministry, Morris served as chairman of the House Standing Committee on Transport, Communications and Infrastructure from 1990 to 1996. In 1992, following a lengthy inquiry, he delivered the committee's influential Ships of Shame report, which concluded substandard shipping practices were widespread and recommended increased government regulation of the industry at both national and international level. Upon his retirement from Parliament in the 1998 election, Morris was the last Labor MP from the time of the Whitlam government still serving, alongside Ralph Willis who retired from Parliament with Morris.

== Post political career ==
After leaving parliament, Morris was appointed chair of the International Commission on Shipping (ICONS), a body established by the International Transport Workers' Federation to inquire into international shipping standards. In 2001, he published a report which concluded that modern slavery and other exploitative practices were rife among developing countries' shipping industries.

Morris served as president of the Newcastle Maritime Museum until its closure for financial reasons in 2018.

Morris died on 26 April 2026, at the age of 93.

Political offices
Preceded by Wal Fife	Minister for Transport; 1983–1987	Succeeded by Gareth Evans
Preceded by Kim Beazley	Minister for Aviation; 1984–1987	Succeeded by Gareth Evans
Preceded by Gareth Evans	Minister for Resources; 1987–1988	Succeeded by Peter Cook
Preceded by Stewart West	Minister for Housing and Aged Care; 1988	Succeeded by Peter Staples
Preceded by Peter Duncan	Minister for Transport and Communications Support; 1988	Succeeded by Bob Brown
Preceded by Ralph Willis	Minister for Industrial Relations; 1988–1990	Succeeded by Peter Cook
Parliament of Australia
Preceded by Charles Griffiths	Member for Shortland; 1972–1998	Succeeded by Jill Hall
