= Robert Coombs (politician) =

Australian politician

Member of the New South Wales Parliament for Swansea
- In office 24 March 2007 – 26 March 2011
- Preceded by: Milton Orkopoulos
- Succeeded by: Garry Edwards

Personal details
- Party: Labor Party
- Spouse: Yasmin Catley
- Children: Three daughters
- Occupation: Merchant sailor, trade union official

Robert Darcy Coombs is an Australian politician and former Labor Party member of the New South Wales Legislative Assembly. Coombs represented the electorate of Swansea from 2007 to his defeat at the 2011 New South Wales state election.

== Career ==
Coombs joined the Australian Merchant Navy in the 1970s, working for six years on BHP vessels sailing out of Newcastle. He joined the Maritime Union of Australia, and eventually rose to become the Sydney Branch Secretary of the Union, then its National President. He also became an Executive Member of Unions NSW. He resigned those roles upon being elected to Parliament.

Coombs was elected to the New South Wales Legislative Assembly in March 2007 for the electorate of Swansea.

Coombs was the Caucus chairman. He was also a member of the committee on the Independent Commission Against Corruption and a member of the Joint Standing Committee on Electoral Matters.

At the March 2011 State Election, Coombs was defeated in the seat of Swansea, after suffering in the statewide landslide defeat of the Labor Party. Coombs lost to the Liberals' Garry Edwards after just one term in parliament, becoming the first Labor member to be defeated by any other political party in Swansea.

== Personal life ==
He is married to the current member for Swansea Yasmin Catley, and they have three daughters.

New South Wales Legislative Assembly
| Preceded by Milton Orkopoulos | Member for Swansea; 2007–2011 | Succeeded by Garry Edwards |
