= Yasmin Catley =

Australian politician

The Honourable Yasmin Catley MP

Minister for Police and Counter-terrorism
- Incumbent
- Assumed office 5 April 2023
- Premier: Chris Minns
- Preceded by: Paul Toole (as Minister for Police)

Minister for the Hunter
- Incumbent
- Assumed office 3 August 2023
- Premier: Chris Minns
- Preceded by: Tim Crakanthorp

Deputy Leader of the Opposition in New South Wales
- In office 2 July 2019 – 28 May 2021
- Leader: Jodi McKay
- Preceded by: Penny Sharpe
- Succeeded by: Prue Car

Deputy Leader of NSW Labor
- In office 2 July 2019 – 28 May 2021
- Leader: Jodi McKay
- Preceded by: Penny Sharpe
- Succeeded by: Prue Car

Member of the New South Wales Parliament for Swansea
- Incumbent
- Assumed office 28 March 2015
- Preceded by: Garry Edwards

Personal details
- Born: Yasmin Maree Catley; 1967 or 1968 (age 58–59) Summerland Point, New South Wales, Australia
- Party: Labor Party
- Spouse: Robert Coombs
- Occupation: Librarian
- Profession: Politician
- Website: www.yasmincatley.com

Yasmin Maree Catley is an Australian politician who is the New South Wales Minister for Police and Counter-terrorism and Minister for the Hunter since 2023. She was elected to the New South Wales Legislative Assembly as the member for Swansea for the Labor Party at the 2015 New South Wales state election.

== Early career ==
Formerly a librarian with the Lake Macquarie City Council, she has worked in the offices of Federal Labor MPs Greg Combet and Anthony Albanese. She is married to Robert Coombs who himself served as the member for Swansea from 2007 to 2011.

== Political career ==
=== Shadow ministry ===
Catley succeeded Peter Primrose as Shadow Minister for Innovation and Better Regulation in the shadow ministry of Luke Foley in March 2016.

From June 2019 to May 2021, Catley was Deputy Leader of the ALP and hence Deputy Leader of the Opposition. She also served as Shadow Minister for Building Reform and Property and Shadow Minister for Rural and Regional Jobs.

Catley resigned as deputy leader on 28 May 2021 along with leader Jodi McKay. She was subsequently appointed Shadow Minister for Customer Service, Digital and the Hunter in the shadow ministry led by Chris Minns.

=== Minns ministry ===
After the 2023 New South Wales state election, Labor formed a minority government and Catley was appointed Minister for Police and Counter-terrorism. She was also appointed Minister for the Hunter in August 2023 following the resignation of Tim Crakanthorp.

Catley supports NSW Police continuing to strip search young people, saying that it "is really important that they have the capacity to be able to do that".

Following the aftermath of the 2025 Bondi Beach shooting, the NSW Government introduced the Terrorism and Other Legislation Amendment Bill 2025, described by the government as the "toughest gun reform in a generation." The bill significantly tightened firearm licensing, mandated gun club memberships, and introduced Public Assembly Restriction Declarations (PARD). These laws allow the Police Commissioner, with the Minister’s concurrence, to prohibit public assemblies in designated areas for up to 90 days following a terrorist incident.

In February 2026, the government faced significant criticism following the police response to a large-scale protest at Sydney Town Hall during the state visit of President of Israel Isaac Herzog. The demonstration, attended by approximately 20,000 people, resulted in 27 arrests and multiple reports of violent clashes between protesters and law enforcement. Catley came under fire from human rights groups, legal observers, and members of her own party, including Labor MPs Anthony D'Adam and Stephen Lawrence over allegations of excessive force and the "militarised" nature of the policing. Specific outrage was directed at viral footage showing officers interrupting Muslim men in prayer, which Federal Islamophobia envoy Aftab Malik described as "unacceptable." Despite calls for an independent inquiry into the use of pepper spray and physical force, Catley defended the NSW Police, stating they had done a "good job" under "incredibly difficult circumstances" and attributed the escalation to the organisers' decision to defy march restrictions.

New South Wales Legislative Assembly
Preceded by Garry Edwards	Member for Swansea; 2015–present	Incumbent
Political offices
Preceded by Penny Sharpe	Deputy Leader of the Opposition of New South Wales; 2019–2021	Succeeded by Prue Car
Preceded by Paul Toole as Minister for Police	Minister for Police and Counter-terrorism; 2023–present	Incumbent
Party political offices
Preceded by Penny Sharpe	Deputy Leader of NSW Labor; 2019–2021	Succeeded by Prue Car
