= Garry Edwards =

Australian politician

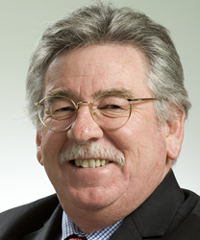

Member of the New South Wales Parliament for Swansea
- In office 26 March 2011 – 6 March 2015
- Preceded by: Robert Coombs
- Succeeded by: Yasmin Catley

Personal details
- Born: Garry Keith Edwards; 6 September 1950 (age 76) Sydney
- Party: Independent
- Other political affiliations: Liberal (until 2014)
- Occupation: Property conveyancer

Garry Keith Edwards (born 6 September 1950) is a former Australian politician who represented the electoral district of Swansea in the New South Wales Legislative Assembly for the Liberal Party from 2011 to 2015.

== Early career and background ==
A property conveyancer, Edwards was elected to Council for the City of Lake Macquarie in 2008 and serves as Deputy Mayor. He is an active member of the Belmont 16 ft Sailing Club and serves as Director of the Club. He is also a patron of Swansea Football Club.

== Political career ==
Edwards won the previously very safe Labor seat from the incumbent member Robert Coombs at the 2011 state election following a previous attempt for the seat at the 2007 state election. Edwards was elected with a swing of 14.0 points and won the seat with 51.1 per cent of the two-party vote. Following his election, Edwards stated that he was yet to make a decision about whether he will continue to sit both on Council and as a member of parliament.

On 14 August 2014, Edwards stood aside from the parliamentary Liberal Party following the ICAC testimony of Newcastle mayor and property developer Jeff McCloy, who told the Commission he had donated $1,800 cash-in-hand to Edwards' campaign. It is illegal in New South Wales to receive political donations from property developers.

Edwards stood as an independent candidate for the seat Swansea at the 2015 state election. He received 14% of the primary vote and lost the seat to the Labor candidate Yasmin Catley.

New South Wales Legislative Assembly
| Preceded by Robert Coombs | Member for Swansea; 2011–2015 | Succeeded by Yasmin Catley |
