= Jill Hall =

Australian politician (born 1949)

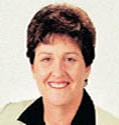

Member of the Australian Parliament for Shortland
- In office 3 October 1998 – 9 May 2016
- Preceded by: Peter Morris
- Succeeded by: Pat Conroy

Member of the New South Wales Parliament for Swansea
- In office 25 March 1995 – 1 September 1998
- Preceded by: Don Bowman
- Succeeded by: Milton Orkopoulos

Personal details
- Born: 16 November 1949 (age 77) Macksville, New South Wales, Australia
- Party: Labor Party
- Spouse: Lindsay Hall
- Children: Peter Hall, Chris Hall and Shayne Hall
- Education: Newcastle University
- Profession: Rehabilitation counsellor

Jill Griffiths Hall (born 16 November 1949) is an Australian former politician who served as a member of the Australian House of Representatives, from 1998 until 2016, representing the seat of Shortland, New South Wales for the Labor Party. She is aligned with the ALP's Socialist Left faction.

== Early life and education ==
Hall was born in Macksville, New South Wales, and was educated at University of Newcastle.

== Career ==
She was a rehabilitation counsellor before entering politics. Hall was member of the New South Wales Legislative Assembly for Swansea from 1995 to 1998.

Of all the members of the 51st Legislative Assembly between 1995 and 1999, she and Alby Schultz were the last to have resigned to successfully contest a Federal seat. (The others were John Fahey, Ian Causley and Paul Zammit.)

Hall was a Labor Whip from October 2004 to November 2012, serving in both Opposition and Government. Prior to entering NSW and Federal politics, Hall was a Councillor on Lake Macquarie City Council.

New South Wales Legislative Assembly
Preceded by Don Bowman	Member for Swansea; 1995–1998	Succeeded by Milton Orkopoulos
Parliament of Australia
Preceded by Peter Morris	Member for Shortland; 1998–2016	Succeeded by Pat Conroy
