= Ivan Welsh =

Australian politician

Ivan Joseph Welsh
- Born: Ivan Joseph Welsh; 25 February 1940; Newcastle, New South Wales
- Died: 15 March 2007 (aged 67); Newcastle, New South Wales
- Occupations: soldier, restaurateur, politician
- Notable work: Commenced "Clean up the Lake" which led to discussions with Ian Kiernan who subsequently developed Clean up Australia
- Title: Member of the Legislative Assembly of New South Wales for Swansea
- Term: 1988–1991
- Predecessor: Don Bowman
- Successor: Don Bowman
- Political party: Independent,

Ivan Joseph Welsh (25 February 1940 – 15 March 2007) was an Australian politician.

Born in Newcastle, Welsh attended Newcastle Boys' High School from 1952 to 1955 and served in the army from 1958 to 1967, including periods in Malaya (1958–60) and Vietnam (1965–66) as a Linguist and Intelligence officer. In 1961, he married Lorraine Gay Cox. After his military service concluded, he became a restaurateur, caterer and salesman, and in 1984 was elected to Lake Macquarie City Council, becoming mayor in 1987.

In 1988, he was elected to the New South Wales Legislative Assembly as an Independent, representing the seat of Swansea. He held the seat until his defeat by the Labor candidate Don Bowman in 1991, in which year he also lost the mayoralty. He continued to contest both state and federal elections, both as an Independent and (in 1996) as a member of the Liberal Party. Welsh died in Newcastle in 2007, at the age of 67. He was cremated.

New South Wales Legislative Assembly
Preceded by Don Bowman	Member for Swansea; 1988–1991	Succeeded by Don Bowman
Civic offices
Preceded by Geoff Pasterfield	Mayor of the City of Lake Macquarie; 1987–1991	Succeeded by Doug Carley
