= Department of Housing and Construction (1983–1987) =

Former Australian government department, 1983–1987

Department overview
- Formed: 11 March 1983
- Preceding Department: Department of Social Security – for the Housing Policy Division and regional staff handling housing matters, Home Savings Grants and Home Deposits Assistance Schemes Department of Industry and Commerce (II) – for the building industry Department of Transport and Construction – for Commonwealth construction functions
- Dissolved: 24 July 1987
- Superseding Department: Department of Industry, Technology and Commerce Department of Community Services and Health Department of Administrative Services (III)
- Jurisdiction: Commonwealth of Australia
- Headquarters: City, Canberra
- Ministers responsible: Chris Hurford, Minister (1983–1984); Stewart West, Minister (1984–1987)
- Department executives: Rae Taylor, Acting Secretary (1983); Tony Blunn, Secretary (1983–1987)

The Department of Housing and Construction was an Australian government department that existed between March 1983 and July 1987.

== Scope ==
Information about the department's functions and government funding allocation could be found in the Administrative Arrangements Orders, the annual Portfolio Budget Statements and in the department's annual reports.

The functions of the department at its creation were:

- Housing
- Building industry planning
- Execution and maintenance of Commonwealth government works
- Design and maintenance of furniture, furnishings and fittings for the Commonwealth government

== Structure ==
The department was an Australian Public Service department, staffed by officials who were responsible to the Minister for Housing and Construction.
