= Don Bowman (politician) =

Australian politician (1936–2013)

Donald John Bowman (25 May 1936 – 30 April 2013) was an Australian politician. He was the Labor member for Swansea in the New South Wales Legislative Assembly from 1981 to 1988 and from 1991 to 1995.

Bowman was born in Newcastle to electrical linesman Donald Napier Bowman and his wife Annie. He attended high school at Hamilton from 1948 to 1952, and went on to achieve a Bachelor of Arts from the University of New England in 1955. After completing his national service in 1956 he was a regional high school teacher, receiving his Diploma of Education in 1966. He joined the Labor Party in 1965 and married Margaret Estelle Thomson in 1969. He was active both in the local Labor Party and in the local teachers' associations, and in 1974 was elected to Lake Macquarie City Council, where he remained until 1980.

In 1981 he was selected as the Labor candidate for the new seat of Swansea (the seat replaced Munmorah, whose member, Harry Jensen, retired). He won the seat easily and was re-elected in 1984, but in 1988 he was defeated by Lake Macquarie Mayor Ivan Welsh, running as an independent. He regained the seat in 1991 but retired in 1995. He had a wife, Margaret, and they had two daughters, Kelly and Zoe. In 2013, he was diagnosed with terminal cancer and died on 30 April of that year, aged 76.

New South Wales Legislative Assembly
Preceded by New seat	Member for Swansea; 1981–1988	Succeeded by Ivan Welsh
Preceded by Ivan Welsh	Member for Swansea; 1991–1995	Succeeded by Jill Hall
