= Department of Housing and Construction (1978–1982) =

Former Australian government department (1978–1982)

Department overview
- Formed: 5 December 1978
- Preceding Department: Department of Construction Department of Environment, Housing and Community Development
- Dissolved: 7 May 1982
- Superseding Department: Department of Social Security (Australia) Department of Industry and Commerce (II) Department of Transport and Construction
- Jurisdiction: Commonwealth of Australia
- Ministers responsible: Ray Groom, Minister (1978–1980); Tom McVeigh, Minister (1980–1982)
- Department executives: George Warwick Smith, Secretary (1978–1980); Collin Freeland; Secretary (1980–1982)

The Department of Housing and Construction was an Australian government department that existed between December 1978 and May 1982.

== Scope ==
Information about the department's functions and government funding allocation could be found in the Administrative Arrangements Orders, the annual Portfolio Budget Statements and in the Department's annual reports.

The functions of the Department at its creation were:

- Planning, execution and maintenance of Commonwealth Government Works
- Housing
- Building industry
- Design and maintenance of furniture, furnishings and fittings for the Commonwealth Government

== Structure ==
The Department was a Commonwealth Public Service department, staffed by officials who were responsible to the Minister for Housing and Construction.
