= Department of Transport and Communications =

Australian government department, 1987–1993

Department overview
- Formed: 24 July 1987
- Preceding Department: Department of Communications (I); Department of Transport (IV); Department of Aviation
- Dissolved: 23 December 1993
- Superseding Department: Department of Transport (V); Department of Communications (II)
- Jurisdiction: Commonwealth of Australia
- Ministers responsible: Gareth Evans, Minister (1987–1988); Ralph Willis, Minister (1988–1990); Kim Beazley, Minister (1990–1991); John Kerin, Minister (1991); Graham Richardson, Minister (1991–1992); Bob Collins, Minister (1992–1993)
- Department executives: Peter Wilenski, Secretary (1987–1988); Graham Evans, Secretary (1988–1993)

The Department of Transport and Communications was an Australian government department that existed between July 1987 and December 1993.

== History ==
The Department of Transport and Communications was one of 16 "super-ministries" announced as part of a major restructuring of the administration and economy by Prime Minister Bob Hawke in July 1987.

The Department oversaw the development of a third runway at Kingsford Smith Airport, achieved new industry structures for aviation and reform of the shipping and waterfront sectors, progressed Australia towards a national railway system and uniform national road regulation, introduced new regulatory arrangements for telecommunications, broadcasting and radio communications and arranged for sale of communications licences for more than a billion dollars.

== Scope ==
Information about the department's functions and government funding allocation could be found in the Administrative Arrangements Orders, the annual Portfolio Budget Statements and in the Department's annual reports.

According to the Administrative Arrangements Order made on 24 July 1997, the Department dealt with:

- Shipping and marine navigation
- Land transport (including road safety)
- Civil aviation and air navigation
- Aviation security
- Postal and telecommunications services
- Management of the electromagnetic spectrum
- Television and radio

== Structure ==
The Department was an Australian Public Service department responsible to the Minister of the day. Department officials were headed by a Secretary, initially Peter Wilenski (until September 1988) and then G.C. Evans (from October 1988).
