= Electoral district of Swansea =

Australian state electorate

Swansea New South Wales—Legislative Assembly
- Interactive map of district boundaries from the 2023 state election
- State: New South Wales
- Dates current: 1981–present
- MP: Yasmin Catley
- Party: Labor Party
- Namesake: Swansea
- Electors: 60,916 (2023)
- Area: 191.45 km^{2} (73.9 sq mi)
- Demographic: Provincial
Electorates around Swansea:
Lake Macquarie	Charlestown	Pacific Ocean
Lake Macquarie	Swansea	Pacific Ocean
Wyong	Wyong	Pacific Ocean

Swansea is an electoral district of the Legislative Assembly in the Hunter and Central Coast regions of the Australian state of New South Wales. It is represented by Yasmin Catley of the Labor Party.

Swansea was created in 1981 and has usually been held by Labor.

== Geography ==
Swansea is situated between Lake Macquarie and the Pacific Ocean in eastern City of Lake Macquarie and northeastern Central Coast Council. It includes Swansea and extends as far north as Valentine, Belmont North and Jewells and as far south as San Remo and Budgewoi.

== Members for Swansea ==
Member	Party	Term
Don Bowman	Labor	1981–1988
Ivan Welsh	Independent	1988–1991
Don Bowman	Labor	1991–1995
Jill Hall	Labor	1995–1998
Milton Orkopoulos	Labor	1999–2006
Milton Orkopoulos	Independent	2006–2006
Robert Coombs	Labor	2007–2011
Garry Edwards	Liberal	2011–2014
Garry Edwards	Independent	2014–2015
Yasmin Catley	Labor	2015–present

== Election results ==
2023 New South Wales state election: Swansea
Party	Candidate	Votes	%	±%
Labor	Yasmin Catley	27,943	53.6	+3.9
Liberal	Megan Anderson	14,590	28.0	−4.9
Greens	Heather Foord	4,463	8.6	+1.4
Sustainable Australia	Alan Ellis	3,253	6.2	+6.2
Liberal Democrats	Paul Jackson	1,918	3.7	+3.7
Total formal votes		52,167	96.3	+0.6
Informal votes		2,010	3.7	−0.6
Turnout		54,177	88.9	−2.1
Two-party-preferred result
Labor	Yasmin Catley	30,972	65.4	+4.8
Liberal	Megan Anderson	16,351	34.6	−4.8
Labor hold		Swing	+4.8	
