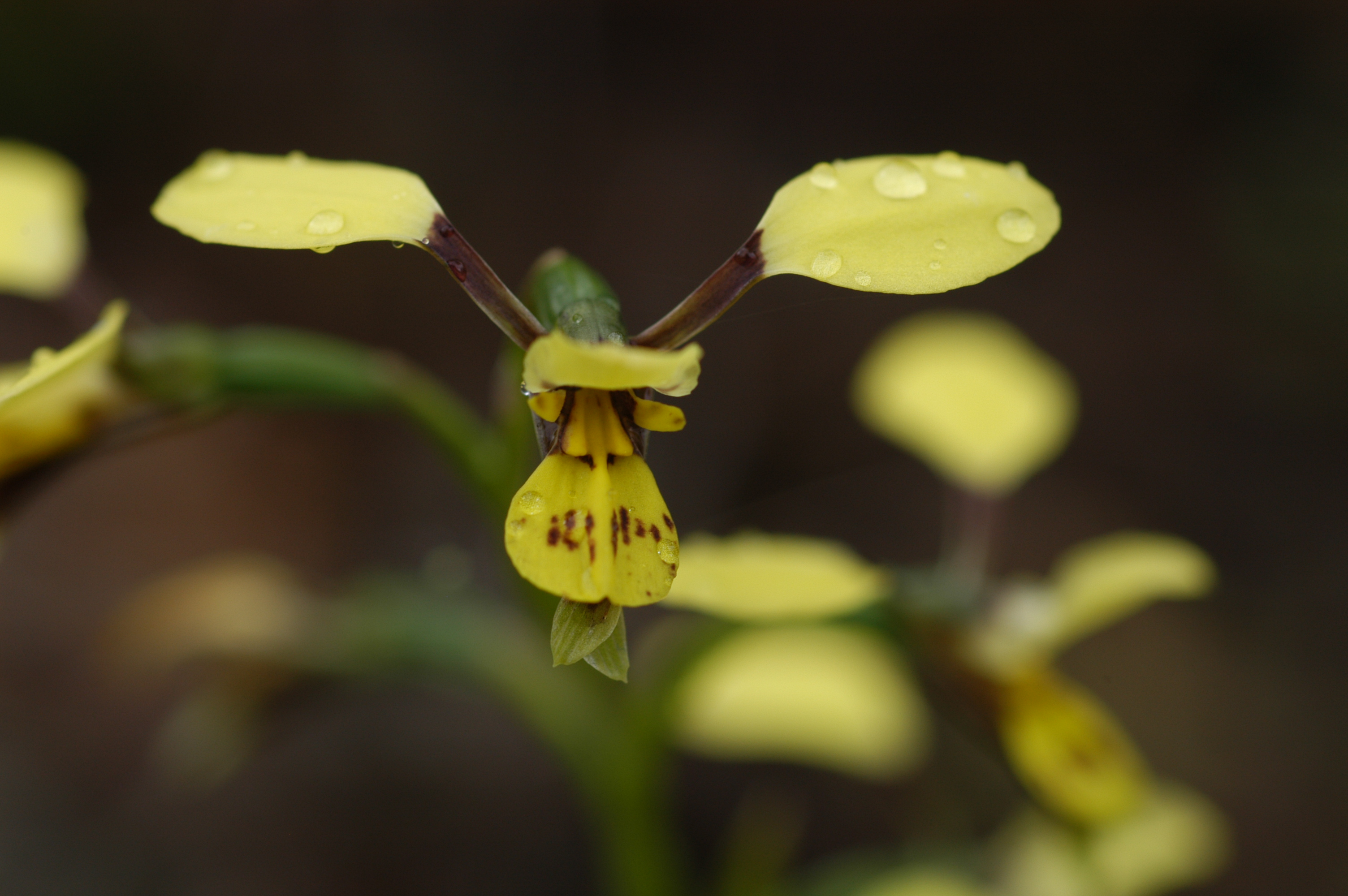
- In the Munmorah State Conservation Area

Conservation status
- Vulnerable (EPBC Act)

Scientific classification
- Kingdom: Plantae
- Clade: Embryophytes
- Clade: Tracheophytes
- Clade: Angiosperms
- Clade: Monocots
- Order: Asparagales
- Family: Orchidaceae
- Subfamily: Orchidoideae
- Tribe: Diurideae
- Genus: Diuris
- Species: D. praecox

Binomial name
- Diuris praecox D.L.Jones

= Diuris praecox =

Early doubletail

Species of orchid

Diuris praecox, commonly known as the early doubletail, Newcastle doubletail or rough doubletail is a species of orchid which is endemic to New South Wales. It has two or three grass-like leaves and up to ten light yellow flowers with a few dark brown marks. It is threatened by urbanisation.

== Description ==
Diuris praecox is a tuberous, perennial herb with two or three linear leaves 150–400 mm (6–20 in) long, 3–5 mm (0.1–0.2 in) wide and folded lengthwise. Between six and ten flowers 20–25 mm (0.8–1 in) wide are borne on a flowering stem 200–400 mm (8–20 in) tall. The flowers are pale yellow with a few dark brown markings at the base of the dorsal sepal and labellum. The dorsal sepal is more or less erect, narrow egg-shaped, 9–11 mm (0.35–0.43 in) long and 4.5–6 mm (0.18–0.24 in) wide. The lateral sepals are linear to lance-shaped, 12–15 mm (0.5–0.6 in) long, about 2 mm (0.08 in) wide, turned downwards and parallel to each other. The petals are more or less erect with a narrow elliptic to egg-shaped blade 8–12 mm (0.3–0.5 in) long and 5–6 mm (0.20–0.24 in) wide on a blackish stalk 4–6 mm (0.16–0.24 in) long. The labellum is 9–12 mm (0.4–0.5 in) long and has three lobes. The centre lobe is egg-shaped, 7–9 mm (0.3–0.4 in) long, 5–7 mm (0.2–0.3 in) wide and the side lobes are linear to egg-shaped, 3–4 mm (0.1–0.2 in) long and about 1.5 mm (0.06 in) wide. There are two ridged calli 3–5 mm (0.1–0.2 in) long in the mid-line of the labellum. Flowering occurs from July to early September.

== Taxonomy and naming ==
Diuris praecox was first formally described in 1991 by David Jones from a specimen collected in the Glenrock State Conservation Area and the description was published in Australian Orchid Research. The specific epithet (praecox) is a Latin word meaning "too early ripe" or "premature" referring to the early flowering period of this orchid, especially compared to the similar Diuris abbreviata.

== Distribution and habitat ==
The early doubletail grows in coastal and near-coastal forests between Bateau Bay and Smiths Lake, especially in the Munmorah State Conservation Area and Wyrrabalong National Park.

== Conservation ==
Diuris praecox is listed as "vulnerable" under the Australian Government Environment Protection and Biodiversity Conservation Act 1999 and the New South Wales Biodiversity Conservation Act 2016. The main threats to the species are loss of habitat due to urbanisation, weed invasion, uncontrolled track expansion and impacts due to recreational use.
