= Glenrock early coalmining sites =

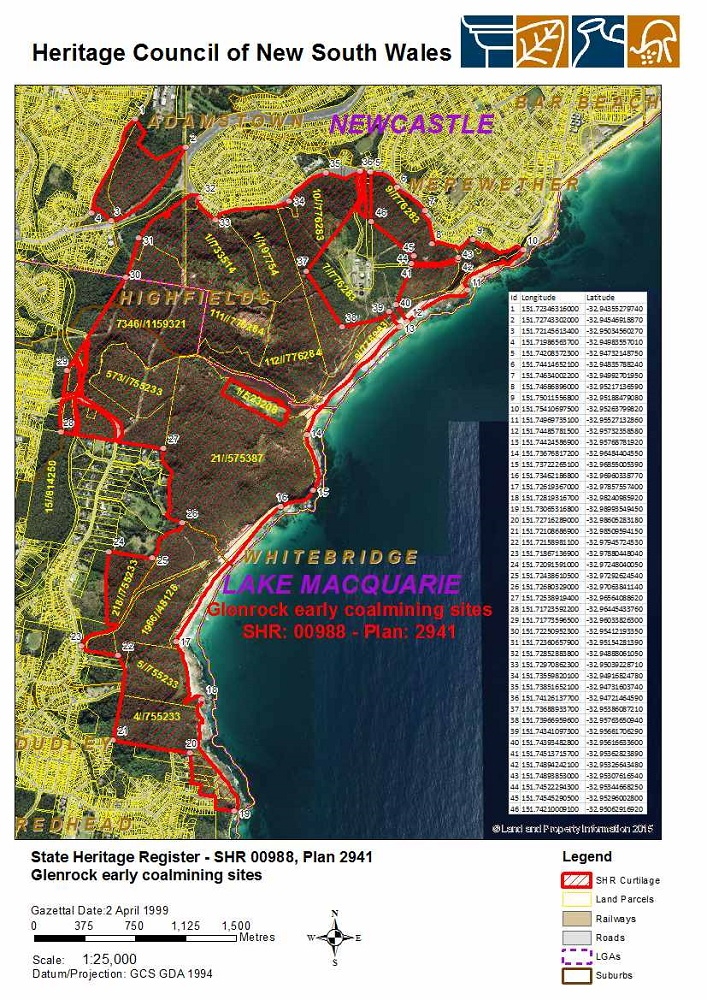
- Heritage boundaries

- Location within New South Wales Location within Australia
- 32.9595°S 151.7366°E
- Location: Glenrock State Conservation Area, City of Lake Macquarie and City of Newcastle, New South Wales, Australia

Site notes
- Owner: Office of Environment and Heritage

New South Wales Heritage Register
- Official name: Glenrock early coalmining sites; Industrial Archaeological Site
- Type: state heritage (archaeological-terrestrial)
- Designated: 2 April 1999
- Reference no.: 988
- Type: Mine site
- Category: Mining and Mineral Processing

Glenrock early coalmining sites is a heritage-listed former coal mine and now recreation Park within the Glenrock State Conservation Area in the Hunter region of New South Wales, Australia. It is also known as Industrial Archaeological Site. The property is owned by Office of Environment and Heritage (State Government). It was added to the New South Wales State Heritage Register on 2 April 1999.

== Heritage listing ==
Glenrock early coalmining sites was listed on the New South Wales State Heritage Register on 2 April 1999.

== See also ==
- Coal in Australia
- List of mines in Australia
