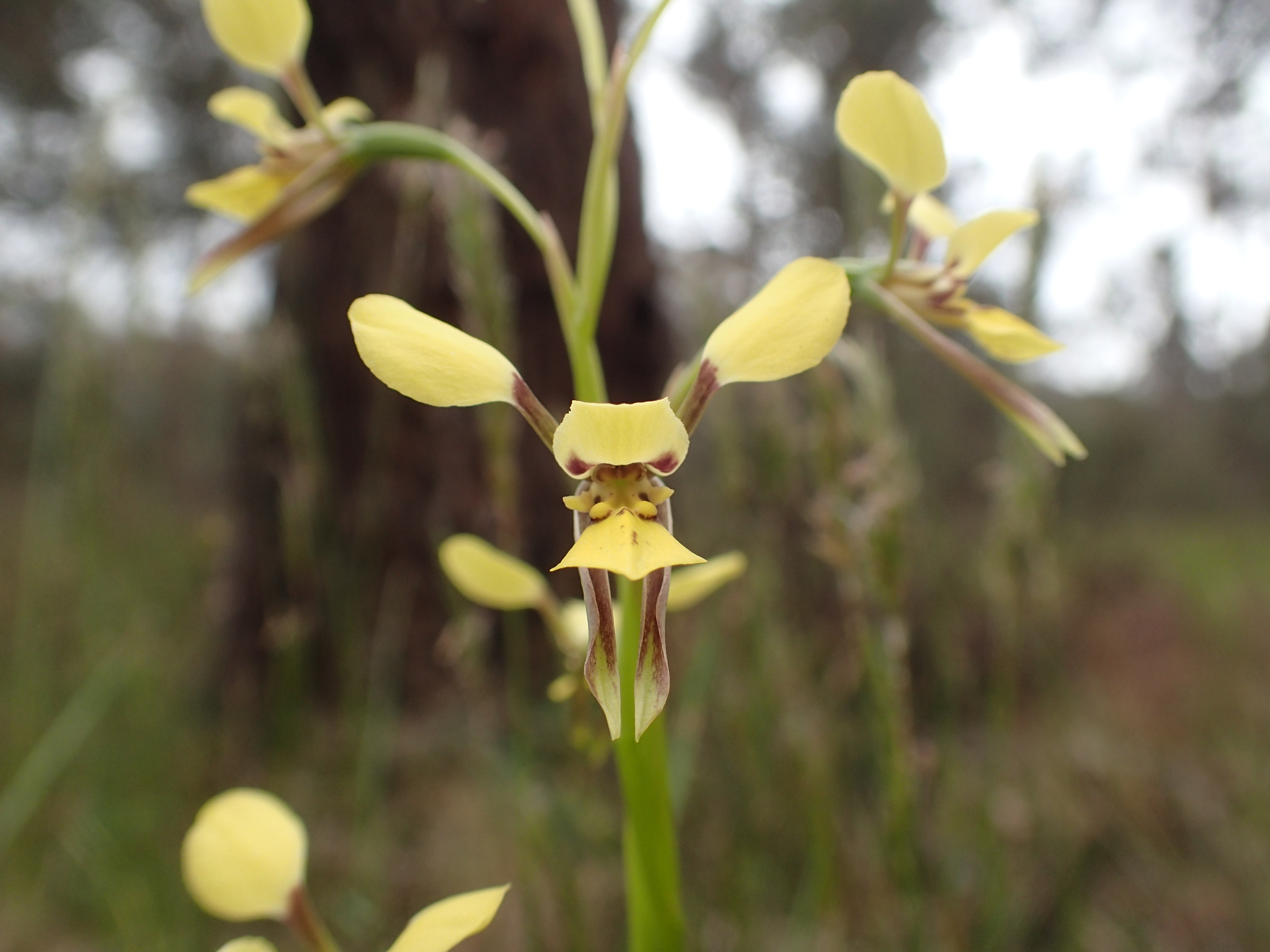
- Diuris abbreviata growing near Guyra

Scientific classification
- Kingdom: Plantae
- Clade: Tracheophytes
- Clade: Angiosperms
- Clade: Monocots
- Order: Asparagales
- Family: Orchidaceae
- Subfamily: Orchidoideae
- Tribe: Diurideae
- Genus: Diuris
- Species: D. abbreviata

Binomial name
- Diuris abbreviata F.Muell. ex. Benth.

Synonyms
- Diuris althoferi RuppRupp; Diuris citrina Nicholls; Diuris cucullata Rupp; Diuris rhomboidalis Rupp

= Diuris abbreviata =

Lemon doubletail

Species of orchid

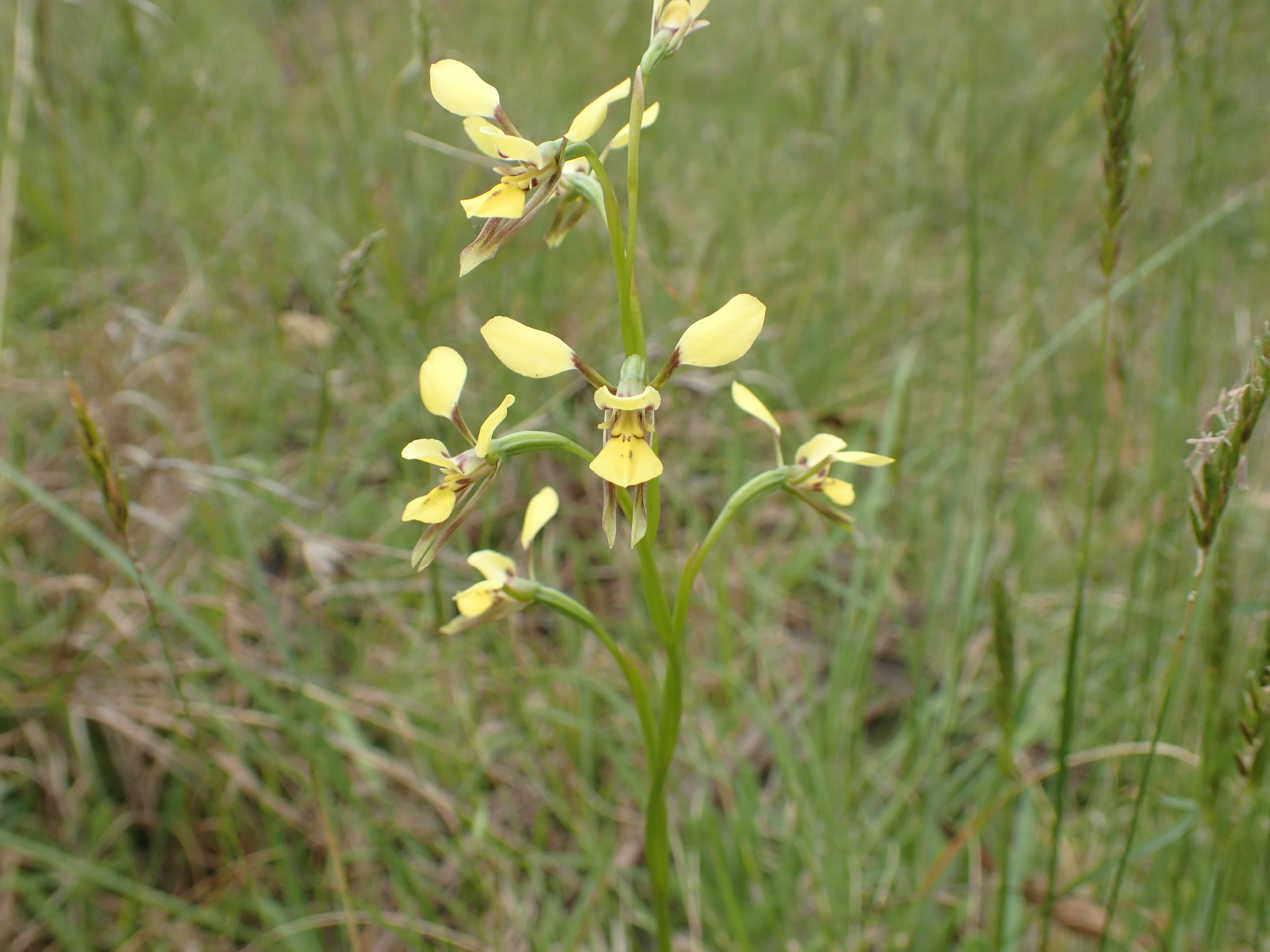
Habit

Diuris abbreviata, commonly known as the lemon doubletail, is a species of orchid that is endemic to eastern Australia. It has two or three leaves and a flowering stem with up to nine yellow flowers with darker markings.

== Description ==
Diuris abbreviata is a tuberous, perennial herb with two or three linear leaves 120–250 mm (5–10 in) long, 3–4 mm (0.1–0.2 in) wide and folded in half lengthwise. There are between three and nine pale to bright yellow flowers with darker markings which lean forwards and are about 25 mm (1 in) wide. The dorsal sepal is egg-shaped, 7–12 mm (0.3–0.5 in) long, 5–8 mm (0.2–0.3 in) wide and more or less erect. The lateral sepals are linear to lance-shaped, 11–16 mm (0.4–0.6 in) long, 1–3 mm (0.04–0.1 in) wide, and turn downwards. The petals are erect, ear-like above the flower, 7–14 mm (0.3–0.6 in) long and 4.5–9 mm (0.2–0.4 in) wide on a brownish, stalk-like "claw" 3–6 mm (0.1–0.2 in) long. The labellum is 7–14 mm (0.3–0.6 in) long and has three lobes. The centre lobe is broad egg-shaped, about 8 mm (0.3 in) wide with a ridge along its mid-line. The lateral lobes are narrow linear to triangular in shape, 2–4 mm (0.08–0.2 in) long and 1–1.5 mm (0.04–0.06 in) wide. There are two ridge-like calli about 5 mm (0.2 in) long near the mid-line of the labellum. Flowering occurs from September to November.

== Taxonomy and naming ==
Diuris abbreviata was first formally described in 1873 by George Bentham from a previously unpublished description by Ferdinand von Mueller and Bentham's description was published in Flora Australiensis. The specific epithet (abbreviata) is a Latin word meaning "shortened".

== Distribution and habitat ==
The lemon doubletail grows in forest and grassland on the ranges and tablelands of New South Wales north of Barrington Tops to south-east Queensland.
