= Glenrock State Conservation Area =

Nature reserve in New South Wales, Australia

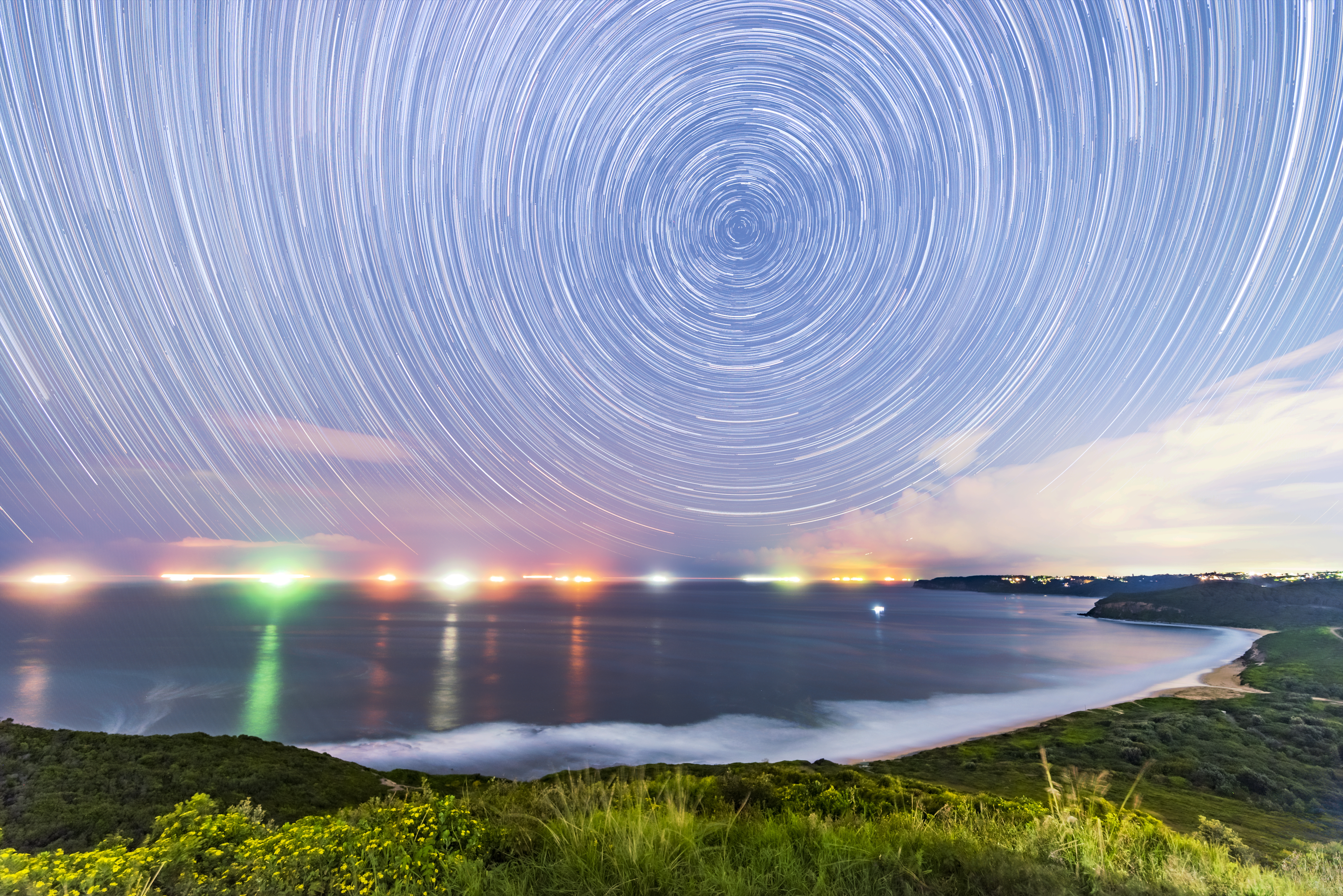
- Star trails in Glenrock State Conservation Area

- Location within New South Wales
- Location: Australia
- Nearest city: Newcastle
- Coordinates: 32.965°S 151.729°E
- Designation: Protected conservation area
- Governing body: NSW National Parks and Wildlife Service

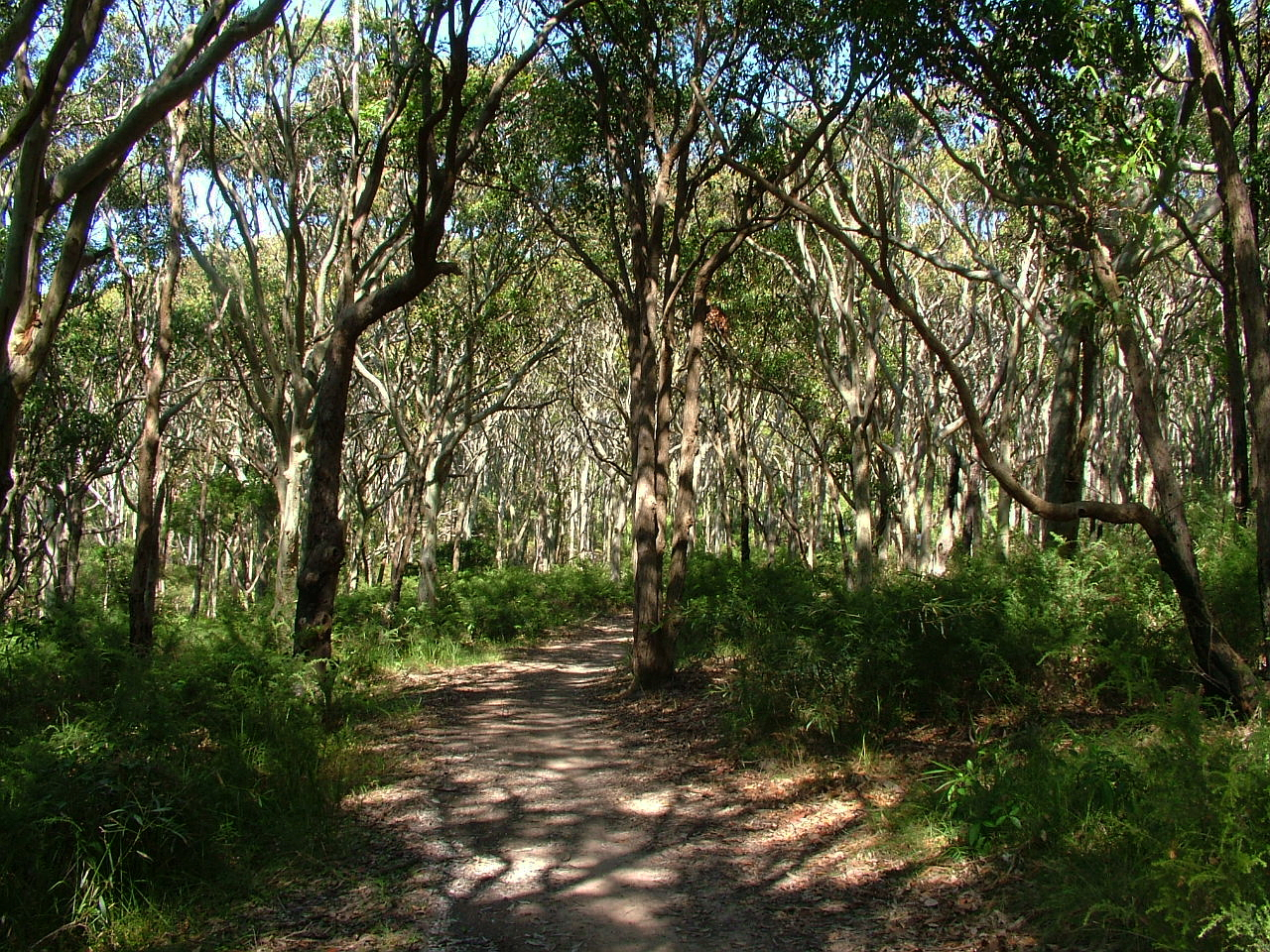
Walking track through open forest, Glenrock State Conservation Area

Glenrock State Conservation Area is a protected conservation area located eight kilometres south of the central business district of Newcastle in the state of New South Wales, on the east coast of Australia. The park borders the coast and encompasses 534 hectares stretching from the residential suburbs of Merewether to Dudley within the Newcastle and Lake Macquarie Local Government Areas.

Glenrock State Conservation Area is significant as it contains a large number of important remnant vegetation communities, contains a number of heritage sites, and is used by a wide variety of user groups. The park contains many cultural records, both Aboriginal and European, and is located within the Awabakal Local Aboriginal Land Council area.

== Overview ==
The park has many features including significant natural and landscape values, cultural heritage values (Aboriginal and European), recreational and tourism uses, and is important for research and education.

Glenrock Lagoon, which is fed by Flaggy Creek, is located within the park and connects to Burwood Beach and the ocean through a small tidal channel.

The park is legislated as a state conservation area under the NSW National Parks and Wildlife Act 1974 which provides protection to conserve biodiversity, maintain ecosystem functions, and conserve places and features of cultural value. This protection also allows certain uses to occur whilst having regard to the natural and cultural values of the park, and provide compatible visitor and tourist use.

The park is used by a wide number of people and variety of interest groups. It contains a number of walking tracks of various grades, including tracks which are accessible by wheel chair. The Great North Walk traverses through the park. The park is well known for its mountain bike tracks which is allowed on designated tracks in the northern section of the park with horse riding also allowed in the northern section of the park or by permit. Other uses include hang gliding, fishing, surfing, orienteering and beach related activities. The park has an active Scouts Australia NSW campsite, Glenrock Scout Camp, adjacent to Glenrock Lagoon.

=== Flora ===
The park contains remnant vegetation including many nationally significant vegetation communities, two endangered ecological communities, and five threatened flora species, and is recognised for its flora diversity.

The park conserves native vegetation which has largely been removed or significantly degraded throughout the lower Hunter, and also includes a number of regionally significant vegetation communities. A total of twelve vegetation communities have been recorded in the park with eight considered poorly conserved at a national level, and two which are listed under the New South Wales Threatened Species Conservation Act as endangered ecological communities. Importantly the park includes some of the last areas containing Permian geology and sediments which are protected within conservation reserves, which explains why the park contains such a high flora diversity.

Significant vegetation communities include littoral rainforest (national and state significance), Permian coastal clay grassland (national and state significance), Permian coastal gully rainforest (regional significance), Permian sheltered dry forest (national significance), Permian exposed coastal scrub (national significance), and Permian coastal clay Melaleuca scrub (national significance).

The park contains five of the last seven known pockets of Littoral Rainforest in the lower Hunter, which is nationally listed as a critically endangered ecological community and as an endangered ecological community under the New South Wales Threatened Species Conservation Act 1995. Glenrock State Conservation Area provides important protection for the Littoral rainforest community which has been significantly reduced in area and is a highly fragmented endangered ecological community.

Endangered plants protected inside the park include the rough double tail (Dirius praecox), magneta lilly pilly (Syzygium paniculatum), white-flowered wax plant (Cynanchum elegans), black-eyed susan (Tetratheca juncea) and heath wrinklewort (Rutidosis heterogama). These plants are all listed as threatened species under the NSW Threatened Species Conservation Act 1995 and listed as nationally threatened under the Commonwealth Environment Protection and Biodiversity Conservation Act 1999.

The status of the park as a conservation area means these important species have some level of protection. This is especially important for some species such as Tetratheca juncea which is found in woodland and heath communities but now has a contracted north south range of 110 km, largely due to clearing for urban development, with historic southern populations around Sydney now extinct.

The rainforest tree Syzygium paniculatum which is found in the park, is found only within the critically endangered littoral rainforests of NSW in disjunct populations often of less than 20 individuals. Despite pressures from clearing for urban development, low population numbers and low genetic diversity, Syzygium paniculatum has been found to be persisting and producing viable and dispersible seed thereby making protected areas where this species exist important for the preservation of this species.

=== Fauna ===
Glenrock State Conservation area contains habitat for a wide variety of animal species with 140 species of bird having been recorded in or nearby to the park including many notable threatened species such as the powerful owl (Ninox strenua), masked owl (Tyto novaehollandiae), turquoise parrot (Neophema pulchella), regent honeyeater (Xanthomyza phrygia) and swift parrot (Lathamus discolour). These species are listed as vulnerable under the NSW Threatened Species Conservation Act 1995 except for the regent honeyeater (Xanthomyza phrygia) and swift parrot (Lathamus discolour) which are listed as endangered and also listed under the Commonwealth Environment Protection and Biodiversity Conservation Act 1999.

The swift parrot (Lathamus discolour) is a nationally significant migratory bird which is also listed as endangered on the IUCN Red List of Threatened Species. The swift parrot only breeds in Tasmania between September and January and migrates to mainland Australia for wintering before returning to Tasmania in early spring. The swift parrot disperses during winter through the landscape in a highly irregular and unpredictable manner based on availability of suitable food and habitat areas. Protected areas such as Glenrock State Conservation Area are important for the swift parrot as the species breeding and wintering habitats have been substantially lost or altered, and while winter foraging is widespread across Tasmania, Victoria, NSW and into Queensland, the coastal areas of NSW are known to be used especially during periods of drought

The regent honeyeater (Xanthomyza phrygia) is another species recorded in the park which is also listed as endangered on the IUCN Red List of Threatened Species. This iconic species has experienced a significant decline in distribution and abundance due to habitat loss and degradation. The species is thought to be attracted to areas within the Lower Hunter by prolific flowering of the spotted gum (Corymbia maculata), a species which is prevalent throughout the Glenrock State Conservation Area.

Reptiles recorded in the park include the diamond python (Morelia spilotes var. spilotes), the death adder (Acanthophis antarticus), tiger snake (Notechis scutatus), brown snake (Pseudonaja textilis), and the land mullet (Ergenia major).

Mammals which have been found in the park include the short beaked echidna (Tachyglossus aculeatus), long nosed bandicoot (Parameles nasuta), sugar glider (Petaurus breviceps), brown antechinus (Antechinus stuartii), and the common dunnart (Sminthopsis murina). Threatened mammal species recorded in the park include the common bent wing bat (Miniopterus schreibersii), little bent wing bat (Miniopterus australis), the nationally threatened grey-headed flying fox (Pteropus poliocephalus), and squirrel glider (Petaurus norfolcensis).

The park is important for locally present species with large home ranges such as the threatened powerful owl (Ninox strenua) and grey-headed flying fox (Pteropus poliocephalus). The powerful owl has a large home range in excess of 1500 hectares and requires mature trees (Eucalypts) for roosting and with habitat which supports sufficient prey The nationally vulnerable grey-headed flying fox (Pteropus poliocephalus), which is endemic to coastal eastern Australia, also requires a large home range and forages predominantly within 20 kilometres from camps however is known to forage up to 50 kilometres. The urban area around the park has been significantly altered and disturbed with few surrounding large sized bush blocks making Glenrock State Conservation Area an important habitat and refuge for a wide variety of species, such as the Powerful Owl and Grey Headed Flying Fox, which require large home range areas containing Eucalyptus forest.

=== Cultural heritage ===
Glenrock State Conservation Area is part of Awabakal Country and the park is believed to have been inhabited since the Pleistocene. The land and landscape within the park is significant to the Awabakal and other Aboriginal peoples, with many sites recorded, including middens, axe grinding groove sites, camp sites and a quarry.

European sites include Australia's first road/tram tunnel (c1846), Australia's first railway tunnels (c1861 and 1862), remains of Australia's first commissioned copper smelter (c1851), remains of Burwood Colliery and a coastal railway. The early coal mining sites within the park are listed on the NSW State Heritage Register.

There are over 145 known cultural sites recorded throughout the park.

== Environmental threats ==
Glenrock State Conservation Area has been affected by a range of land use practices which have caused damage and include habitat disturbance and fragmentation, past mining and other resource use, development by utilities, past and present recreational activities. These have manifested in a number of threats that exist for the park including soil erosion from poorly designed easements and trails, impacts to water quality from urban stormwater and effluent surcharges from a sewerage pipeline, introduced plants and animals, fire management and climate change.

An indicator of the pressures these threats can have is evident in the presence of bell miner associated dieback which is known to occur in several locations throughout the park. While the specific factors that cause bell miner associated dieback are unclear, it is considered to be related to stress on the forest community and to such things as forest disturbance, changes in tree stand structure, an absence of regular burning, development of a dense understory, increase in foliar nutrients, infestation of tree crowns by psyllids, and colonisation by the bell miner. A bush regeneration plan is being implemented in the park to address many of the impacts that contribute to bell miner associated dieback.

Fire management is an important aspect of park management. The unnatural exclusion of fire changes soils and nutrient processes which creates an unfavourable environment for eucalypts, creating a more favourable environment for arbivores and competitors. A fire management plan exists for the park which shows that large areas of the park are classified as being either underburnt or almost underburnt and below thresholds required for some of the different vegetation types, predominantly the dry sclerophyll forest. An appropriate fire strategy can maintain forest health and is also likely to assist in limiting the effects of bell miner associated dieback.

A number of weed species exist in the park including bitou bush (Chrysanthemoides monilifera ssp. rotundata), lantana (Lantana camara) and blackberry (Rubis fruticosus), all of which are listed on the Noxious Weeds Act 1993. Bitou bush (Chrysanthemoides monilifera ssp. rotundata) is a major environmental weed along the south eastern coast of Australia within littoral habitats and is of particular concern in Glenrock State Conservation Area as it is widespread and is affecting a number of the endangered ecological communities and threatened species. This weed is listed as a key threatening process under the Threatened Species Conservation Act 1995 and accordingly the parks bush regeneration plan and pest management strategy aims to target the management of this species.

== Management ==
Glenrock State Conservation Area is managed by the NSW National Parks and Wildlife Service. A sewage treatment plant is located on designated land within the park boundaries which is owned and operated by Hunter Water Corporation. Electricity easements also exist throughout the park containing transmission lines which are managed by Energy Australia.

A Conservation Management Plan and Cultural Tourism Plan for the northern section of the park was completed in 2003 which formed an important input into the development of a Plan of Management which was adopted in September 2010. The Glenrock State Conservation Area Plan of Management (2010), which was prepared by the NSW Department of Environment and Climate Change outlines the attributes of the park, management priorities, visitor opportunities and education, research and monitoring, and relevant operational management issues.

Management priorities focus on managing impacts from the various threats to the park, impacts from the wide variety of activities that occur in the park, and protection of the conservation and cultural values.

Newcastle Council has prepared a Coastline Management Plan which includes the Burwood Beach section of the park and identifies the collaborative approach required to manage the park given the diverse number of stakeholders who have an interest.
