= Bowen Basin Coalfields =

Coal mine with gas fields in Australia

Coordinates: 23°10′39.55″S 148°22′22.80″E

The state of Queensland. Bowen Basin is in Central Queensland.

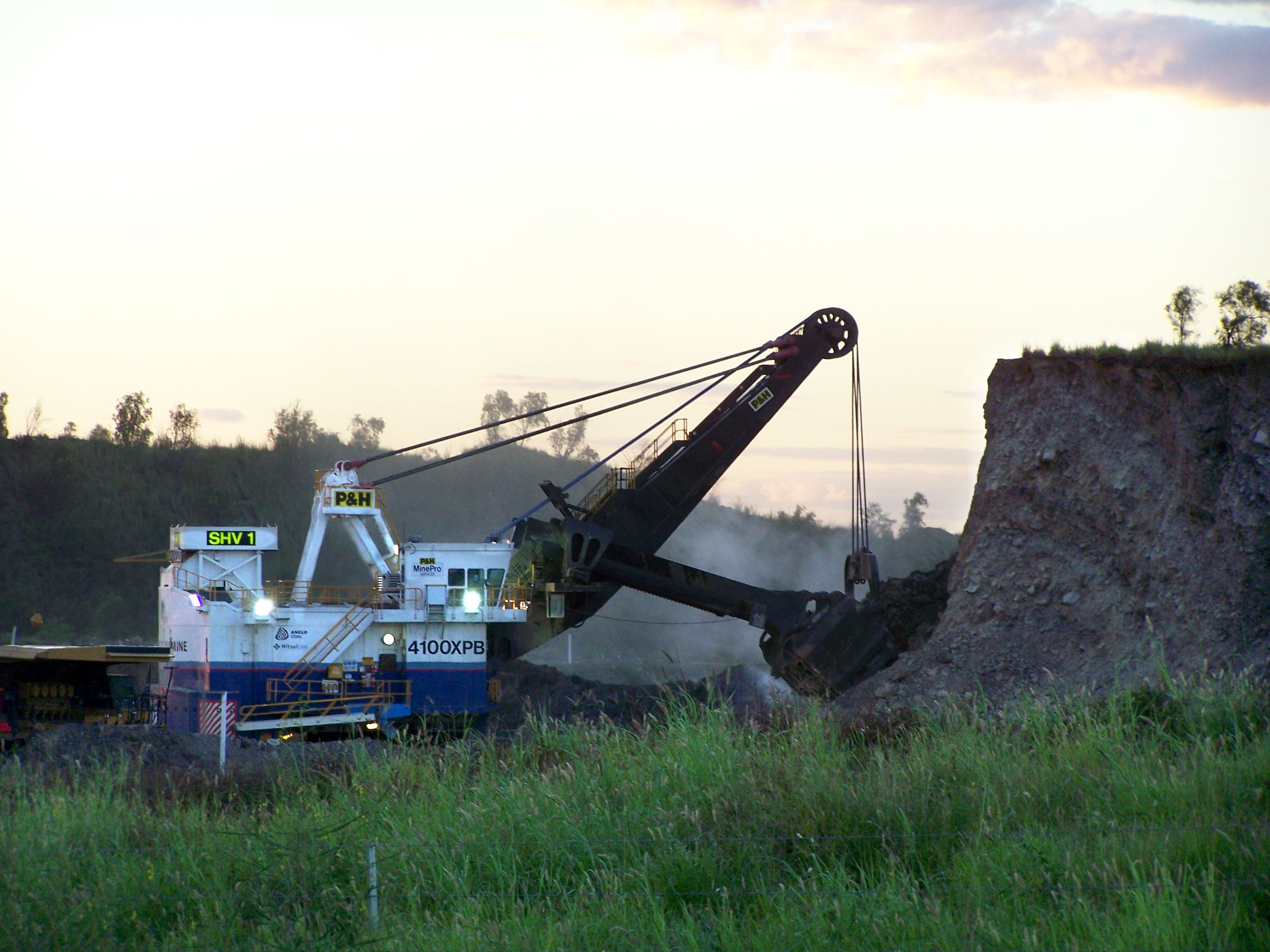
Digging overburden at Dawson Mine near Moura, 2008

The Bowen Basin Coalfields contains the largest coal reserves in Australia. This major coal-producing region contains one of the world's largest deposits of bituminous coal. The Basin contains much of the known Permian coal resources in Queensland including virtually all of the known mineable prime coking coal. It was named for the Bowen River, itself named after Queensland's first Governor, Sir George Bowen.

The Bowen Basin covers an area of over 60,000 square kilometres in Central Queensland running from Collinsville to Theodore. There was a combined population of 41,973 people in the area in 2001. The ornamental snake is a small reptile native to the Bowen Basin region.

== History ==
The Bowen Basin covers an area about 600 km long and 250 km wide extending from Collinsville in the north to south of Moura in Central Queensland. It contains about 70% of Queensland's coal. These are deposits of the Permian age and are the most important commercial deposits in the State, producing almost 100% of the State's coking coal and 60% of its thermal coal. In 2006–7, the State's top ten collieries for production were located in the Bowen Basin.

Commercial exploitation of Bowen Basin coal began at Blair Athol in the 1890s. At the time, the main coal-producing area was the West Moreton coalfields. Some coal was also produced at the Burrum coalfields and on the Darling Downs. These mines supplied mostly thermal (steaming) coal to a domestic market; the Railway Department was a major customer. The success of mines depended on whether the coal was suitable for firing boilers and on their proximity to a railway line. Most early mines in the Bowen Basin struggled to remain commercially viable.

Intensive exploration of the Bowen Basin coalfield began only after the crisis in the base metals industry due to falling prices from 1907. Tests on the Bowen River Coal Company's lease in 1912 and 1913 sparked a rush to the field. Five syndicates had registered 17 leases straddling the Bowen outcrops by the end of 1915. However, the election of Queensland's first stable Labor government led in August 1915 to Cabinet refusing the private applications and reserving the 6.4 square kilometre area involved for State operations.

Competition for leases subsided into a long wait for railway construction to be completed. Construction of the 789 kilometres of railway took five years and the delay had exhausted most of the speculators long before the line opened in 1922. At the same time, by the end of 1919, a further nineteen leases had been forfeited to the State for non-payment of rent, and the surviving syndicates had amalgamated to form the Bowen Consolidated Coal Mining Company which established the Bowen Consolidated Colliery in Scottville.

== Mining ==
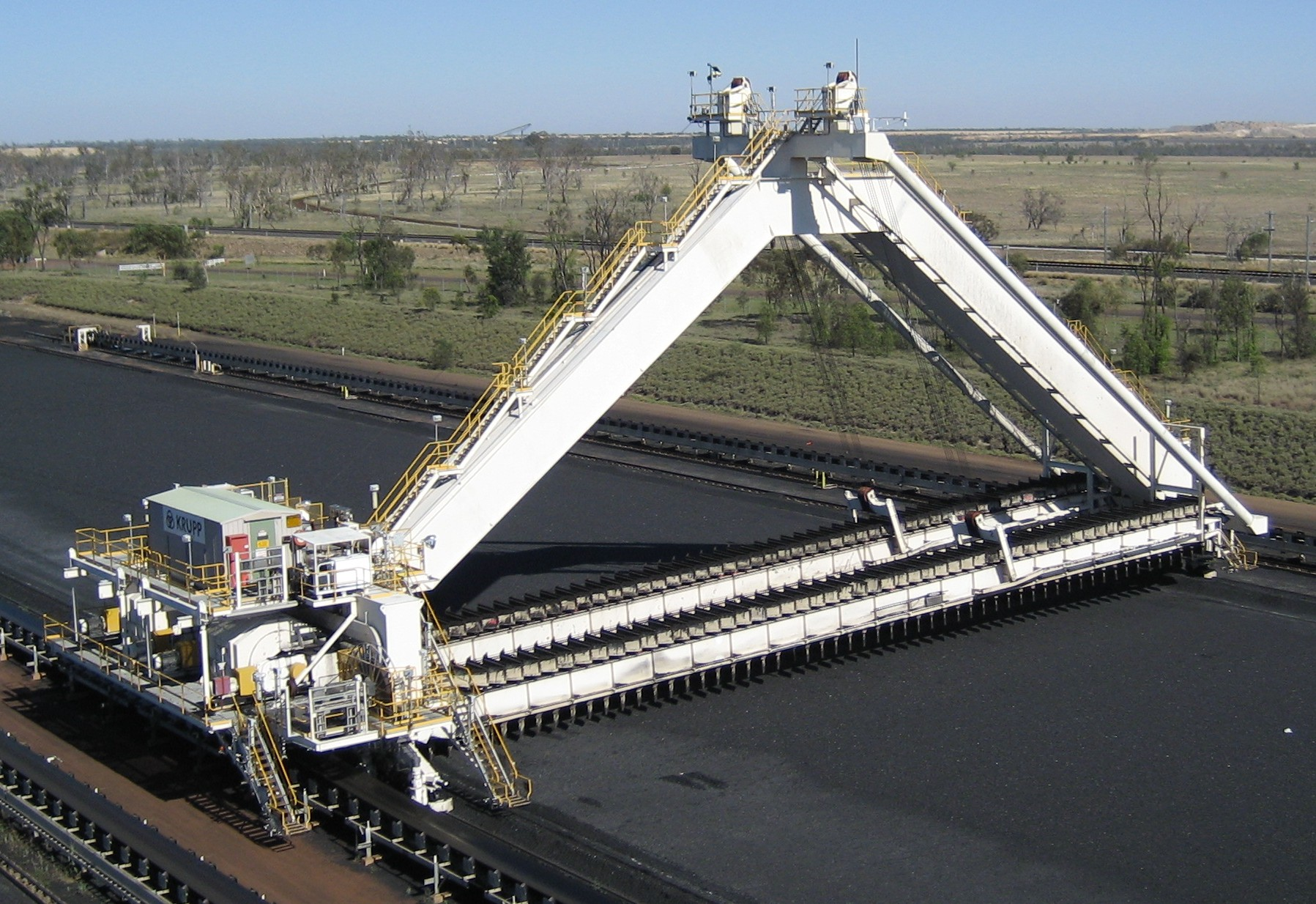
A reclaimer operating at Kestrel coal mine, 2006

Most of the basin's open cut and underground coal mines are located in the north. The basin had 48 operational coal mines in August 2011. In mid-2011, evidence of a continuing mining boom was provided by state government figures which showed more than 50 mining projects are under consideration in the Bowen Basin. The Goonyella railway line is the main route for exports of coal via Dalrymple Bay and Hay Point. Exports are also sent via the Port of Gladstone. Rio Tinto Coal Australia's Kestrel coal mine, near Emerald was named after a bird found in the area.

=== Major coal mines ===
- Byerwen Mine while still under development employed 1,000 workers in August 2011.
- Curragh coal mine employed 1,600 workers in August 2011.
- Dawson Central Mine employed 1,560 workers in August 2011.
- Goonyella Riverside Mine employed 2,360 workers in August 2011.
- Hail Creek coal mine employed 1,270 workers in August 2011.
- Peak Downs Mine employed 1,760 workers in August 2011.
- Saraji coal mine employed 1,615 workers in August 2011.

Other mines in the basin include Foxleigh coal mine, Coppabella coal mine, Collinsville coal mine, Blair Athol coal mine, Middlemount coal mine, Yarrabee coal mine, South Walker Creek coal mine, Rolleston coal mine, Oaky Creek coal mine, Norwich Park coal mine, North Goonyella coal mine, Newlands coal mine, Moranbah North coal mine, Kestrel coal mine, Jellinbah coal mine, Gregory coal mine, Blackwater coal mine, Broadmeadow, Daunia, Caval Ridge, Poitrel and German Creek coal mine.

=== Mining companies ===
- BHP Mitsubishi Alliance
- Felix Resources
- Idemitsu Kosan
- Macarthur Coal
- Peabody Energy
- QCoal
- Vale
- Wesfarmers
- Glencore
- Rio Tinto

=== History ===
Ludwig Leichhardt was the first European to discover coal deposits in the region in 1845. Robert Logan Jack was a Queensland Government geologist who reported coal deposits in the basin in 1878. The first attempt to mine coal in the basin was in 1892 at Tolmies. However, by 1900 the site was abandoned. The area around Collinsville was first explored for resources in the 1920s. Large scale coal exploration began in the Bowen Basin in the 1960s.

In 2006, 60% of Australia's exported coking coal came out of the Bowen Basin. In 2010, nearly all the mines in the basin were affected by record flooding. Many mines were forced to declare force majeure, meaning they could not meet their contractual obligations.

== Gas fields ==
=== Fairview gas field ===
The Fairview gas field is developed by the Comet Ridge Project, a coal seam gas extraction project in the Bowen Basin. Fairview is PL 91 located in the Comet Ridge Project Area comprising PLs 90, 91, 92, 99,100, 232, 233,234, 235 and 236 and ATPs 526P, 653P, 655P and 745P, some 500–600 kilometres north-west of Brisbane or 100–200 kilometres north of Roma. Total area is approximately 5,000 square kilometres, stretching 175 kilometres to the north from Injune.

The project is operated by Santos Limited, which has a net revenue interest of 76.07%, and a working interest of 79.5%. Santos acquired the Comet Ridge coal seam gas project comprising Fairview and 4,000 square kilometres of exploration acreage in 2005 through the acquisition and subsequent merger of Tipperary Corporation's Australian assets into the Santos gas portfolio. The remaining participants, which include origin parties, hold a combined net revenue interest of 22.93%, and a working interest of 20.5%.

The discovery well, the Fairview 1, was drilled in August 1994, followed by a number of other wells which subsequently began dewatering to establish the technical and commercial viability of coal seam gas. Gas production started in January 1995, with first sales gas in February 1998. More than 100 wells have been drilled at year end 2005, with some 80 wells in the Fairview area. Of these, 57 are connected and producing to the gathering system with the remainder undergoing dewatering operations and/or awaiting completion and connection.

Gas is gathered to two compressor sites (CS1 and CS2) where it is compressed and dehydrated before export as sales to the Fairview lateral of the Queensland Gas Pipeline system. Following the merger into Santos’ operations on 28 October 2005 and the subsequent integration, extra compression has been brought on line and additional wells connected, which has increased sales gas production by 66%. Sales gas production is around 45 TJ/day, limited by the capacity of the export pipeline. Average well productivity is around 0.9 TJ/day, with a number of wells flowing in excess of 5 TJ/day.

Development during 2006 includes the construction of a new 130 kilometre pipeline from CS2 to Wallumbilla, expansion of the gas processing facilities, and drilling and connection of additional wells. This will increase sales gas capacity to 70 TJ/day in 2007. In the longer term, additional development and facilities will enable sales gas production to be increased to approximately 200 TJ/day in 2012, with Santos share approximately 140 TJ/day.

=== Scotia gas field ===
The Scotia gas field is in the Bowen Basin, onshore Eastern Queensland, approximately 340 kilometres north-west of Brisbane and 145 kilometres north-east of Roma on the Burunga anticline within PL 176. The area of PL 176 is approximately 213 square kilometres. Santos has a 100% working interest in the project.

The discovery well, the Scotia 3, was drilled in 1996. It was the first well drilled to test the late Permian coal seam gas play. Coal seam methane gas production started in 2002. Under a 15-year contract the field supplies CS Energy's gas-fired power station.

Total investment to date is approximately A$65 million. The Scotia field comprises 25 connected wells gathered into a central processing facility. The processing includes water separation, glycol dehydration and four-stage compression. Sales gas is transported via a 111-kilometre Scotia/Peat lateral pipeline to join the Roma to Brisbane Pipeline, about 116 kilometres east of Wallumbilla.

== Environmental concerns ==
Protests against processing and export via an enlarged Gladstone port at Curtis Island, escalated in 2012 and UNESCO have called for greater environmental assessment of the port proposal for the World Heritage Listed Great Barrier Reef. There are also concerns over the pollution of water from the Great Artesian Basin.

== See also ==
- Geology of Queensland
- Hunter-Bowen orogeny
- Mining in Australia
