= Coal companies of Australia =

Coal companies have operated in Australia from when the infancy of the colonies.

From initial local mines in the colonies and the creation of colliery companies, subsequent amalgamations have occurred, while others have changed industries. In 1833 Australian Agricultural Company commenced running some underground mines in the Newcastle and South Maitland coalfields. Another 1900s mine was owned by the Abermain Colliery Company Limited later became absorbed by the 1931-merged J. and A. Brown and Abermain Seaham Collieries Limited, whose founders were able to undercut Australian Agricultural Company's coal sale price. Browns' company then merged again with Caledonian Collieries Limited to form Coal & Allied Industries Limited in 1960. Similarly, founded in 1923, and subject of a protracted takeover battle by two large companies that took the dispute to the Privy Council (1974), R. W. Miller was acquired by Howard Smith Limited in 1985, until merged with Coal & Allied in 1988. Coal & Allied became a 2013–2017 subsidiary of Rio Tinto Coal Australia, until 2017 when it was acquired by Yancoal.

Some of the more notable companies are listed here.

Abbreviation in use: Mtpa: million tonnes per annum.

== Summary of coal companies ==
Major Australian coal mining companies
Company	Total coal mined (Mtpa)	Main mines
Anglo American Metallurgical Coal Ltd	32.00	a. Anglo Coal Callide Mine, Queensland b. Anglo Coal Capcoal Mine, Middlemount Qld c. Anglo Coal Dartbrook Mine, Muswellbrook NSW d. Anglo Coal Drayton Mine, Muswellbrook NSW e. Anglo Coal Foxleigh Mine, Middlemount Qld f. Anglo Coal Grasstree Mine, Middlemount Qld g. Anglo Coal Moranbah North, Moranbah Qld h. Dawson mine, one of Queensland's leading export coal operations, is owned by the Moura Joint Venture, comprising Anglo Coal Australia Pty Ltd (51%) and Mitsui Coal Holdings Pty Ltd (49%)
Bloomfield Collieries Pty Ltd	0.88	Bloomfield at East Maitland and Rix's Creek at Singleton
BHPBilliton – Hunter Valley Energy Coal	15.0	Mount Arthur Coal, Muswellbrook, Hunter Valley
BHP Mitsubishi Alliance (BMA) Coal Operations Pty Ltd	58.0	a. Broadmeadow Mine b. Goonyella Riverside c. Gregory Crinum d. Peak Downs Mine e. Saraji Mine f. South Walker Creek Mine g. Poitrel Mine is situated south-east of the town of Moranbah h. Hay Point Coal Terminal, located 38 kilometres (24 mi) south of Mackay
Centennial Coal	20.0	Airly, Newstan, Awaba (Closed), Myuna, Mandalong, Mannering, Angus Place, Springvale, Charbon, Berrima, Clarence, Cooranbong (Closed), Munmorah (Closed)
Coalpac	1.20	Cullen Valley mine is located in the Western Coalfield, New South Wales
Cornwall Coal Company	0.725	NE Tasmania
Coronado Global Resources		Owns Curragh Coal Mine located in Central Queensland
Enhance Place	0.20	Colliery near Lithgow, New South Wales
Ensham Resources	9.0	Pits A, B, C & D either side of the Nogoa River – referred to as the ‘Ensham Project’ – and the ‘Yongala’ pit, which is located approximately 5 kilometres (3.1 mi) to the north of the main Ensham operation
Felix Resources	3.90	a. Singleton in the Hunter Valley b. Central Queensland's Bowen Basin c. Emerald in Queensland's Bowen Basin d. The Moolarben coal project is a world class coal asset located 40 kilometres (25 mi) east of Mudgee in the Upper Hunter Valley e. Harrybrandt exploration project, near Nebo, Bowen Basin, Queensland
Foxleigh Joint Venture		Central Queensland
Yancoal	14.00	Donaldson, Gloucester Basin, Monash, Middlemount, Yarrabee, Ashton, Moolarben, Austar
Idemitsu Australia Resources	8.00	Western Bowen Basin, Queensland
BHP Illawarra Coal	8.00	Western Bowen Basin, Queensland
Jellinbah Group	8.60	Western Bowen Basin, Queensland
Lithgow Coal Company	1.00	Western Bowen Basin, Queensland
Macarthur Coal	5.50	Western Bowen Basin, Queensland
Muswellbrook Coal Company		Western Bowen Basin, Queensland
New Hope Group	3.92	Acland on the Darling Downs and at Rosewood near Ipswich
Peabody Pacific	22.00	a. Burton mine is located in the Bowen Basin b. North Goonyella underground and Eaglefield open-cut mines are located at the northern end of the Bowen Basin c. Millennium mine is located near the town of Moranbah in the Bowen Basin d. Wilkie Creek mine is located in the Surat Basin of south-east Queensland e. Wilpinjong mine is located 10 kilometres (6.2 mi) south-east of Ulan mine and 40 kilometres (25 mi) north-east of Mudgee f. Wambo is one of Peabody's largest operating mines and is located in the Hunter Valley g. Chain Valley is located in the Newcastle coalfield on the southern shore of Lake Macquarie h. Metropolitan is located in the Southern coalfields, about 50 kilometres (31 mi) south of Sydney
QCoal	n/a	Owns or co-owns five mines within the Bowen Basin
Rio Tinto Coal Australia	5.80	Blair Athol, Hail Creek and Kestrel Mines and is currently constructing the Clermont Mine Project, all in Queensland and in New South Wales, Rio Tinto Coal Australia manages Coal & Allied's operations at Mount Thorley Warkworth, Hunter Valley Operations and Bengalla
Vale	8.00	(a) Integra Coal, Hunter Valley, open cast and underground mines, 61.2% owned by Vale. (b) Carborough Downs Mine, Central Queensland, underground longwall mine owned 80% by Vale. (c) Isaac Plains Joint Venture, Central Queensland, open cast mine owned 50% by Vale.
Wesfarmers	2.16	a. Premier Coal mine at Collie in Western Australia's south west b. Bengalla mine in the Hunter Valley, New South Wales
Whitehaven Coal	23.1	Operates 6 mines in the Gunnedah Region of New South Wales. Several large scale projects are in the works, namely the Vickery Project in Gunnedah and Winchester South project in Central Queensland. Owns and operates Blackwater Mine located in Central Queensland.
Xstrata	29.30	a. Westside, New South Wales b. West Wallsend, New South Wales c. Bulga, New South Wales d. Beltana, New South Wales e. Narama, New South Wales f. Mangoola, Hunter Valley, New South Wales g. Mount Owen – The Mount Owen Complex consists of the Mount Owen, Ravensworth East and Glendell open cut coal mines h. Ravensworth, New South Wales i. Ulan Coal j. Baal Bone, New South Wales k. Cumnock, New South Wales l. Narama, New South Wales

== Anglo Coal Australia Ltd ==
Anglo Coal Australia Ltd owns and operates a number of mines in Queensland and New South Wales.

=== Mines ===
Callide mine
is a leading Queensland domestic coal producer providing low-sulphur, sub-bituminous thermal coal primarily for domestic power generation. The coalfields cover an area of 180 square kilometres (69 sq mi) and contain seams up to 26 metres thick. Annual production is 7 Mtpa of sub-bituminous thermal coal. At December 2014, estimates for ROM reserves are approximately 202 Mt of domestic and export thermal quality, with an additional 262 Mt of mineable in-situ resources outside the current mine layout.
Capcoal
operates three underground mines and an open-cut mine which all produce premium quality hard coking coal for export steel markets. The majority of coal is mined from the German Creek Formation, noted for containing hard coking coal of exceptionally high quality. The German Creek Sequence contains five coal seam intervals known as the German Creek, Corvus, Tieri, Aquila and Pleiades seams. Annual Production: Capcoal mines 11.8 Mt of coal each year to produce in excess of 8.5 Mt of prime quality hard coking coal. Reserves for the mining leases controlled by Capcoal cover 27,343 hectares and estimated resources exceed one billion tonnes with in situ mineable reserves of 125 Mt.
Dartbrook mine
was an underground mine located north of Muswellbrook, New South Wales.
Drayton mine
an open cut mine operated by Anglo Coal (Drayton Management) Pty Ltd, located approximately 13 kilometres (8.1 mi) south east of Muswellbrook in the Upper Hunter Valley. It commenced operations in 1983 as a 2 Mtpa thermal coal producer.
Foxleigh mine
Anglo Coal Australia acquired a 70% interest in Foxleigh coal mine on 29 February 2008. Foxleigh is an open-cut operation located adjacent to Anglo Coal Australia's Capcoal Surface Operation, in the heart of the Bowen Basin in Central Queensland. Foxleigh currently produces a low volatile pulverised coal injection (PCI) coal product for use in steelmaking applications around the world. Foxleigh coal is taken from the Middlemount, Tralee, Roper and Pisces seams from within the Rangal coal measures in the southern Bowen Basin. Annual Production: Foxleigh produces approximately 2.5 Mtpa of pulverised coal injection (PCI) coal for the steelmaking industry. The mine's production capacity is 3.3 Mtpa of product coal. Reserves are estimated at 290 million tonnes – Foxleigh and surrounding tenements are the subject of ongoing exploration and feasibility studies.
Grasstree mine
Underground longwall mine produces approx 10 Mtpa of metallurgical coal. It is located near Middlemount Central Queensland.
Moranbah North coal mine
located in the northern part of Queensland's Bowen Basin around 18 kilometres (11 mi) north of the town of Moranbah. Mining commenced at Moranbah North in 1998. The mining lease covers annual production of 4.5 Mt of hard coking coal. Reserves of over 20 years mine life.
Dawson mine
located in Moura, Queensland, has been an open-cut mine since 1994.

== Bloomfield Collieries Pty Ltd ==
The Bloomfield Group is an Australian owned group of private companies which operate in the Hunter Valley, New South Wales. The Group has interests in mining and engineering. It operates two open-cut coal mines: Bloomfield at East Maitland and Rix's Creek at Singleton. Rix's Creek is 5 kilometres (3.1 mi) north west of Singleton on the New England Highway. Situated in the Whittingham Coal Measures, it is part of the Singleton Super Group including the Barrett, Liddell, Arties and Pikes Gully seams. The mine produces 0.88 Mtpa.

== BHP ==
=== BMA ===
Jointly owned with Mitsubishi Development Pty Ltd, the BHP Mitsubishi Alliance (BMA) is Australia's largest coal miner and exporter, and the world's largest supplier to the sea borne coking coal market. BMA's mines are located in the coal-rich Bowen Basin of Central Queensland, where BMA owns and operates six mines – Goonyella Riverside, Broadmeadow, Peak Downs, Saraji, Norwich Park and Gregory Crinum – and the Hay Point terminal near Mackay. The Bowen Basin covers an area of 75,000 square kilometres (29,000 sq mi) of Permian Age marine and freshwater sediments and is roughly triangular in shape, extending around 550 kilometres (340 mi) from its northern peak at Collinsville, southwards to its base at Theodore, where it is approximately 250 kilometres (160 mi) wide. With the exception of the Crinum and Broadmeadow underground longwall operations, the mines are open-cut, using dragline and truck/shovel fleets for overburden removal. Coal seams are mined by front end loader and hydraulic excavators, and coal is transported to mine preparation plants by large capacity haul trucks.

=== Mines ===
The mines managed by the BMA have a capacity to produce 58 million tonnes of coal annually, which are currently sold to over 93 customers in 23 countries, including Japan, the UK, Europe, South America, Korea, Taiwan and India.

Broadmeadow Mine
BMA's newest punch longwall underground operation on the Goonyella Riverside lease, commenced longwall mining in August 2005. Broadmeadow Mine is located 30 kilometres (19 mi) north of Moranbah and 190 kilometres (120 mi) south west of Mackay and has the capacity to produce over three million tonnes of high quality coking coal a year.
Goonyella Riverside
produces over 14 million tonnes of coking coal a year. The mine is located 30 kilometres (19 mi) north of Moranbah and 190 kilometres (120 mi) south west of the Hay Point port facilities. It is the northernmost of the mines operated by BMA in the Bowen Basin.
Gregory Crinum
located 60 kilometres (37 mi) north east of the rural centre of Emerald and 375 kilometres (233 mi) north west of Gladstone and comprises the Gregory open-cut operations and Crinum underground mine. Gregory open-cut coal mine became operational in 1979, with the first shipment taking place in 1980. Production has been scaled back since the commissioning of the adjacent Crinum underground longwall mine in 1997.
Norwich Park Mine
located 24 kilometres (15 mi) south east of Dysart and 266 kilometres (165 mi) south west of Mackay. Norwich Park open-cut coal mine began production in 1979 and has a production capacity of 5.5 million tonnes of coking coal and ultra low volatile coal a year. It was closed down May 2012.
Peak Downs Mine
located 30 kilometres (19 mi) south of the town of Moranbah and 195 kilometres (121 mi) south west of the Hay Point port facilities. Peak Downs is a large, open-cut mining operation, which was developed in the early 1970s. The first coal was mined in April 1972. Today, Peak Downs has a production capacity of nine million tonnes of coking coal per annum.
Saraji Mine
located 24 kilometres (15 mi) south of Peak Downs mine and 213 kilometres (132 mi) south west of the Hay Point coal export terminal. Construction of the Saraji open-cut coking coal mine began in late 1972 and production began in the latter part of 1974. Saraji has a current production capacity of eight million tonnes of high grade coking coal a year.
Hay Point Coal Terminal which
located 38 kilometres (24 mi) south of Mackay, is one of Australia's largest and most efficient coal receival and export facilities. Following a recent expansion program, the terminal has the capacity to handle and despatch around 43–45 Mtpa.

=== BMC ===
BMC owns and operates two open-cut metallurgical coal mines in the Bowen Basin – South Walker Creek Mine and Poitrel Mine. BMC is owned by BHP (80 per cent) and Mitsui and Co (20 per cent).

=== Mines ===
South Walker Creek Mine
located on the eastern flank of the Bowen Basin, 35 kilometres (22 mi) west of the town of Nebo and 132 kilometres (82 mi) south west of the Hay Point port facilities. South Walker Creek is a contract mining operation owned by Stanmore Resources. Annual production capacity is 3.2 million tonnes of marketable coal, which is suitable for Pulverised Coal Injection (PCI).
Poitrel Mine
situated south-east of the town of Moranbah, and began open-cut operations in October 2006.

== Hunter Valley Energy Coal (HVEC) ==
The Mount Arthur coal mine is a large open-cut mine near Muswellbrook in the Hunter Valley, New South Wales, producing approximately 16 Mtpa.

== Centennial Coal ==
Centennial Coal, located predominantly in New South Wales, was acquired in September 2010 by Thailand-based Banpu, which operates in the coal and energy industries. Centennial is a coal mining and marketing company supplying thermal and coking coal to the domestic and export markets. The company has five operating coal mines in NSW, making Centennial one of the largest underground coal producers in NSW. It is a major fuel supplier in NSW, producing approximately 40% of the State's coal-fired electricity. The company sells approximately 40% of its coal to export markets, primarily for use in power stations and steel mills in Japan, Korea, Taiwan and Europe. Coal is exported through ports at Newcastle and Port Kembla in New South Wales.

=== Mines ===
Angus Place Colliery
located 15 kilometres (9.3 mi) north west of Lithgow in the Western Coalfield of New South Wales. Nominal annual production capacity exceeds 3.0 Mtpa.
Awaba Colliery
located near Toronto in the Newcastle Coalfield of New South Wales. Planned production of 770,000 tonnes for the 2009 financial year.
Berrima Coal
located in the Southern Highlands of New South Wales. Production capacity of up to 250,000 tonnes per annum on a single unit, single shift operation – annual production dependent
Charbon Coal
located at Kandos in the Western Coalfield of New South Wales. Production capacity of approximately 1.2 Mtpa.
Clarence Colliery
located near Lithgow in the Western Coalfield of New South Wales. Production capacity of up to 2.5 Mtpa – Australia's most productive continuous miner operation.
Mandalong Mine
located near Morisset in the Newcastle Coalfield of New South Wales. Production currently 4.8 Mtpa, peaking at 5.5 million tonnes in 2010 and averaging 5.0 Mtpa thereafter, with production dependent on longwall changeovers (on average three longwall changeovers every 24 months).
Mannering Colliery
located in the Newcastle Coalfield of New South Wales. Production capacity of 1 Mtpa, targeting 900,000 tonnes for the 2009 financial year.
Myuna Mine
located in the Newcastle Coalfield of New South Wales. Current production capacity of 1.5 Mtpa − expanding to 2 Mtpa with new unit in the Wallarah Seam.
Newstan Mine
located in the Newcastle Coalfield of New South Wales. Infrastructure capacity exceeds 4 Mtpa, including a high capacity coal preparation plant, on-site rail balloon loop with triangle facing both North and South for transport of domestic and export products and a dedicated haul road to Eraring Power Station.

=== Pollution issues ===
Centennial Coal has been responsible for more than 900 pollution notices between 2000 and 2013 from the NSW Environment Protection Authority (EPA).

In 2015 it was responsible for a major release of coal fines into the Wollangambe River and World Heritage listed areas of the Blue Mountains National Park. Centennial Coal has been dumping mine effluent into the Wollangambe River for approximately 30 years, effectively killing large sections of it.

Between 2000 and 2015, Centennial's Clarence Colliery has been cited for more than 65 non-compliance breaches of its licence. As of 2015, Centennial Coal has applied to extend the Springvale Mine, undermining swamps of "National Environmental Significance" and dumping up to 50 million litres a day of mine effluent into the Coxs River which also flows through the Blue Mountains World Heritage area and into Sydney's drinking water catchments.

== Coalpac Pty Ltd ==
Coalpac acquired the assets of the Lithgow Coal Company in February 2008. These assets include the Cullen Valley Mine located in the Western Coalfield of New South Wales. Coalpac has been operating in the Lithgow district since 1989. The company currently operates the Cullen Valley open cut mine and the Invincible open cut mine. See also effects of the mining operation on surrounding property.

== Cornwall Coal ==
Cornwall Coal Company is a wholly owned subsidiary of Cement Australia. The company operates underground and open-cut coal mines, and a coal washing and processing plant, with the main facilities located in NE Tasmania, and a mine in Southern Tasmania. Production of raw coal in 2007/2008 totalled 725 490 tonnes, with 436 544 tonnes of saleable coal being produced.

== Donaldson Coal Pty Ltd ==
Donaldson Coal is a coal producer based in New South Wales, Australia. The mining operations are based in the Hunter Valley just south of Maitland, 25 kilometres (16 mi) from Newcastle and Port Waratah. Production is sourced from three mines.

=== Mines ===
Donaldson open-cut
which commenced operations in 2001, is located approximately 23 kilometres (14 mi) from the Port of Newcastle on a mining lease contained within both Maitland and Cessnock Council areas. It is currently Donaldson Coal's largest operating mine.

The Tasman underground mine, where mining started in 2006, is near Mount Sugarloaf, approximately 20 kilometres (12 mi) from Newcastle and 18 kilometres (11 mi) from South Maitland. Entry to the site is off George Booth Drive approximately 1.5 kilometres (0.9 mi) west of Seahampton. The mine lease covers approximately 952 hectares (2,350 acres) with George Booth Drive to the north, the F3 Freeway to the east and Mount Sugarloaf in the centre. Production commenced in late 2006, following approval by the Minister for Infrastructure and Planning.

Abel Underground Mine
is situated in the Black Hill area 26 kilometres (16 mi) from Newcastle, with the portal coming off the high wall of Donaldson Open Cut Mine. Development consent was granted in June 2007, and mining commenced in March 2008. Once fully developed, the mine will provide employment for up to 375 direct employees from the lower Hunter Region. The mine uses existing surface infrastructure and the Bloomfield Coal Handling and Preparation Plant, rail loader and rail loop for coal processing and loading.
Donaldson open-pit coal mine
(Donaldson Coal Pty Ltd., 100%) is located 5 kilometres (3.1 mi) southeast of Maitland, NSW and has an annual rated output of 2.5 million tonnes.

== Enhance Place Pty Ltd ==
Enhance Place Colliery near Lithgow, NSW. Pine Dale Coal Mine.

== Ensham Resources Pty Ltd ==
Established in 1993 as a joint venture among major international companies and their Australian subsidiaries, Ensham Resources Pty Limited is one of Queensland's largest and fastest-growing thermal coal producers. Ensham's mining operations currently consist of five open-cut coal mining pits: Pits A, B, C and D either side of the Nogoa River—referred to as the ‘Ensham Project’—and the ‘Yongala’ pit, which is located approximately 5 kilometres (3.1 mi) to the north of the main Ensham operation. Total combined production is currently in the vicinity of 9 Mtpa. Ensham Resources produces around 9 Mtpa of high-energy low-ash thermal coal and small quantities of semi-soft coking coal. The coal is exported to leading energy producers in Japan, Korea, India and China and other countries.

== Felix Resources Limited ==
Felix Resources is an expanding company with a focus on coal mining and the development and operation of coal-related assets.

Harrybrandt exploration project
Felix acquired 100% beneficial ownership of it in January 2005. The project is located near Nebo in Queensland's Bowen Basin. Nearby coal mines are Coppabella (Macarthur), South Walker (BMA) and Moorvale (Macarthur). Harrybrandt is located favourably with regard to established infrastructure and port facilities.

== Yancoal ==
Ashton underground and open-cut coal operations
are located approximately 12 kilometres (7.5 mi) north-west of Singleton in the Hunter Valley, New South Wales. The Ashton mines are adjacent to the open-cut mines of Glendell (Xstrata), Camberwell (Vale), Lemington (Rio Tinto), Ravensworth (Xstrata), and Narama (Xstrata). Adjacent underground mines include Glennies Creek (Vale) and Newpac (Xstrata). Felix Resources acquired the interest in the Ashton open-cut and underground projects effective from January 2005. Shortly after, a 30 percent stake was sold to the Singapore-based International Marine Corporation Group (IMC) in August 2005. The Ashton Coal operation is an unincorporated joint venture between Felix Resources (60%), International Marine Corporation Group (30%), and Itochu Corporation of Japan (10%) Felix is the operator of these mines. The Ashton open-cut and underground coal mines have a current production capacity of approximately 3.9 Mtpa of high quality soft coking coal. This coal is predominantly exported to Asian steelmakers. Due to restrictions in the Newcastle (PWCS) Port a capacity balancing system (CBS) has been introduced, which will limit all shippers' outputs.
Yarrabee open-cut coal mine
is located approximately 40 kilometres (25 mi) north-west of Blackwater in Central Queensland's Bowen Basin. The Yarrabee coal project has been owned and operated entirely by Yancoal since 2004. Yarrabee is a wholly owned subsidiary. The Yarrabee mine is an open-cut coal mine with a capacity to produce 1.7 Mtpa of low-volatility, high-energy, Pulverised Coal Injection (PCI) coal and Thermal coal.

Moolarben coal project
is a world-class coal asset located 40 kilometres (25 mi) east of Mudgee in the Upper Hunter Valley, New South Wales. This project adjoins the Ulan coal mine (Xstrata/ Mitsubishi) to the north-west and the Wilpinjong coal mine (Peabody) in the east. The Moolarben deposit is an unincorporated joint venture with Sojitz Corporation of Japan (10%), a consortium consisting of Korea Resource Corporation (KORES), Korea Electric Power Company (KEPCO) and four of its generator subsidiaries, Kosep, Komipo, Kowepo and Kospo plus Hanwha Corporation Limited (a total of 10%). Felix owns 80% of the project and will operate the project. The Moolarben resource is approximately 610 million tonnes of high quality open-cut and underground thermal coal with approved capacity of 10 Mtpa. The open-cut strip ratio is less than 3:1.

Athena
located adjacent to the operating Minerva Mine, is an exploration project owned by Felix (51%), Sojitz (45%) and Kores (4%) in an unincorporated joint venture. The tenement area covers 27,000 hectares (67,000 acres). The Inferred Resource is 560 million tonnes. Initial drilling indicates coal of similar or better quality than Minerva. Drilling to date has produced an 11-metre intersection with a washed product of very high quality.

=== Newcastle Coal Infrastructure Group (NCIG) Terminal ===
Felix Resources is one of six companies involved in the construction of the NCIG terminal which is designed with a final capacity of 66 Mtpa. The first stage is 30 Mtpa.

== Foxleigh Mining Pty Ltd ==
Foxleigh Mining is the operator of a coal mine in central Queensland. The project is a joint venture between Brisbane company CAML Resources (63%), ICRA Foxleigh, part of the Japanese Itochu group (20.6%), and Indigenous Business Australia (IBA) (16.4%). The mine commenced operations in late 1999 and presently exports coal to steel mills in Korea, Japan, and elsewhere. In July 2004, the mine had between 20 and 30 Indigenous employees on site among an employee population of approximately 230.

== Idemitsu ==
One of the world's largest privately owned energy companies with major investments in oil refineries and petroleum products, primarily in Japan. J-Power (formerly Electric Power Development Corporation (EPDC)) is one of Japan's largest power utilities. LG International is one of Korea's largest diversified conglomerates with interests in a vast array of international businesses including electronics. Bligh Coal is a 100% subsidiary of Idemitsu.

== Ensham Resources ==
Queensland's third largest thermal coal producer is planning to expand its operations significantly in coming years with a proposed future underground mine in addition to continued expansion of its open-cut operations. Idemitsu Australia Resources Pty Ltd and its Australian subsidiary, Bligh Coal Limited together own 85% of the joint venture. The operator of the mine, Ensham Resources Pty Limited, together with the company's marketing arm, Ensham Coal Sales are based in Brisbane. Ensham Resources produces around 9 Mtpa of high-energy low-ash thermal coal and small quantities of semi-soft coking coal. The coal is exported to leading energy producers in Japan, Korea, India and China and other countries.

== Illawarra Coal Holdings Pty Ltd ==
Illawarra Coal produces premium-quality, hard coking coal (used in the production of steel) and some energy coal. Based in Wollongong and operating in the Illawarra and Wollondilly regions south of Sydney, New South Wales, Australia. Illawarra Coal operates three high-volume underground longwall mines: Appin/Appin West, West Cliff (to the west of the Illawarra Escarpment) and Dendrobium (on the eastern side of the Escarpment).

== Appin West ==
Known as the Douglas Project during its development stages, Appin West is an extension of the existing Appin Mine that accesses valuable coking coal reserves to the north of the previous Tower Mine operations. Appin West is situated on Douglas Park Road, near Douglas Park, to the west of Appin, approximately 30 minutes from Wollongong.

=== Mines ===
Appin longwall coal mine
(Illawarra Coal Holdings Pty Ltd., operator (BHP Billiton Ltd., 100%)) is located 40 kilometres (25 mi) northwest of Wollongong and has an annual rated output of 8.8 million tonnes.
West Cliff longwall coal mine
(BHP Billiton Ltd., 100%) is located 43 kilometres (27 mi) northwest of Wollongong and has an annual rated output of 2.3 million tonnes.
Dendrobium underground coal mine
(BHP Billiton Ltd., 100%) is located 15 kilometres (9.3 mi) southwest of Wollongong and has an annual rated output of 5.2 million tonnes.

== Jellinbah Group ==
Jellinbah Group Pty Ltd (formerly Queensland Coal Mine Management Pty Ltd) is a privately owned independent Queensland-based coal company. Jellinbah Group has 70% ownership interests in the Jellinbah and Lake Vermont Mines. Jellinbah Group is also the manager of both operations.

=== Mines ===
Jellinbah coal mine
located on the Tropic of Capricorn, near Bluff and the product coal is hauled by rail to the Port of Gladstone, approximately 300 kilometres (190 mi) from the mine. The mine has been in operation since 1989. The mine produces metallurgical coals (low-volatile PCI coal and semi-soft coking coal). The mine has a current production capacity of 4.6 Mtpa. Jellinbah Mine coal is marketed by Jellinbah Resources Pty Ltd, a wholly owned subsidiary of Jellinbah Group.
Lake Vermont Mine
located near Dysart and product coal is hauled by rail to the Port of Gladstone and Dalrymple Bay Coal Terminal. Lake Vermont's first shipment was in February 2009. Jellinbah Group appointed Thiess Mining as the operators of the Lake Vermont mine. Lake Vermont produces hard coking coal and low-volatile PCI coal. The mine has a current production capacity of 7 Mtpa. Lake Vermont Mine coal is marketed by Lake Vermont Marketing Pty Ltd, a wholly owned subsidiary of Jellinbah Group.

== Lithgow Coal Company Pty Ltd ==
Coalpac acquired the assets of the Lithgow Coal Company in February 2008. These assets include the Cullen Valley Mine located in the Western Coalfield of New South Wales, Australia. It is immediately adjacent to the Baal Bone Colliery to the west and the Invincible Colliery to the south, and is approximately 5 kilometres (3.1 mi) by road from the Mount Piper coal-fired power station. The Mine has development consent to produce up to 1 Mtpa, however historical production has been around 700,000 tonnes per annum.

== Macarthur Coal ==
An independent Queensland-based coal mining company with operations located in Queensland's Bowen Basin. Macarthur Coal currently operates out of its Coppabella, Moorvale and Middlemount mines. The company also has an extensive range of prospects for new projects.

Macarthur Coal mines approximately 5.5 million tonnes of raw coal to produce 4.2 million tonnes of product coal each year.

== Muswellbrook Coal Company Ltd ==
Taken over by Muswellbrok Industries Limited.

Idemitsu Muswellbrook Coal a subsidiary of Idemitsu Kosan acquired the entire share capital of Muswellbrook Coal from Muswellbrook Energy and Minerals.

== New Hope Group ==
New Hope is an independent energy company which has open-cut mines at Acland on the Darling Downs and at Rosewood near Ipswich. The New Acland open cut mine is located approximately 150 kilometres (93 mi) west of Brisbane in the Darling Downs region of Queensland. The mining method used at New Acland is an open-cut multi-thin-seam operation which utilises trucks, excavators and front-end loaders. Overburden is blasted or ripped by bulldozers prior to extraction. New Oakleigh operates an open-cut coal mine near the town of Rosewood, 23 kilometres (14 mi) west of Ipswich and 92 kilometres (57 mi) from the Port of Brisbane. The mining method used at New Oakleigh is a multi-thin-seam operation utilising trucks, excavators and front-end loaders. Overburden is blasted or ripped by bulldozers prior to extraction.

During the fiscal year ended 31 July 2008 (fiscal 2008), total saleable coal production from New Hope's operations was 4.451 million tons. The New Acland Mine is located 16 kilometres (9.9 mi) northwest of Oakey on the Darling Downs inQueensland and is the company's major production source with approximately 3.92 million tons produced during fiscal 2008. The balance of coal production in the fiscal year 2008 of 531,000 tons came from the New Oakleigh mine in the West Moreton district, near Ipswich. In September 2008, the company announced the sale of New Saraji Coal project to the BHP Mitsubishi Alliance.

== Peabody Energy Australia ==
Peabody Pacific is one of Australia's largest mining companies with a total of 10 operations in Queensland and New South Wales. In 2003, Peabody Energy shipped a record 185 million tonnes (204 million tons) of coal to its clients worldwide.

Queensland hosts six of the mine sites operated by Peabody Pacific. Four of these, Burton, North Goonyella, Eaglefield and Millennium span the length of the Bowen Basin coalfield. The Wilkie Creek mine site operates within the Surat Basin. Burton mine is located in the Bowen Basin, about 150 kilometres (93 mi) south-west of Mackay. Mining commenced in 1996 and now extends over three individual operating pits: Plumtree, Wallanbah and Broadmeadows. The open-cut mine uses the terrace mining technique supported by a truck and shovel fleet. It is operated under contract by Thiess. North Goonyella underground and Eaglefield open-cut mines are located at the northern end of the Bowen Basin, about 160 kilometres (99 mi) west of Mackay. The combined operations produce around three million tonnes (3.3 million tons) of coking coal a year from a lease of 3,341 hectares (8,260 acres). Mining commenced from the underground in 1994. Millennium mine is located near the town of Moranbah in the Bowen Basin. Mining commenced in May 2006 at a rate of 1.5 million tonnes (1.65 million tons) a year. The mine plans to increase its annual saleable PCI and coking coal production to three million tonnes (3.3 million tons) as port constraints are eased at Dalrymple Bay Coal Terminal. Millennium provides a low-ash coking coal and low-to-mid-volatile PCI coal to customers in Japan, Korea and India. Wilkie Creek mine is located in the Surat Basin of southern Queensland. Although mining originally started in 1994, Peabody commenced operations in 2005. Currently producing around 1.8 million tonnes (2 million tons) of low-sulphur, low-nitrogen, environmentally superior thermal coal, plans are under way to ramp up to 2.5 million tonnes (2.8 million tons) in 2008.

Peabody Pacific operate four mine sites in New South Wales. These extend from the Hunter Valley coalfields west of Newcastle to the Southern coalfields just below Sydney. Wilpinjong mine is located 10 kilometres (6.2 mi) south-east of Ulan mine and 40 kilometres (25 mi) north-east of Mudgee. Mining commenced in late 2006; production in 2009 was 8.3 million tons, and Peabody plans to make further investments to increase output. Wambo is one of Peabody's largest operating mines and is located in the Hunter Valley, about 30 kilometres (19 mi) from Singleton. Mining commenced in 1969. Wambo produces around five million tonnes (5.5 million tons) of saleable thermal coal a year. Metropolitan is located in the Southern coalfields, about 50 kilometres (31 mi) south of Sydney. The coal leases cover an area of 5,195 hectares. The mine currently produces around 1.5 million saleable tonnes (1.65 million tons) of hard coking and semi-hard coking coal per year. Reserves provide for a mine life of more than 20 years at current and proposed levels of production.

== Rio Tinto Coal Australia ==
In Queensland, Rio Tinto Coal Australia operates the Blair Athol coal mine, Hail Creek coal mine and Kestrel coal mine and is currently constructing the Clermont Mine Project. In New South Wales, Rio Tinto Coal Australia manages Coal & Allied's operations at Mount Thorley Warkworth, Hunter Valley Operations and Bengalla.

Hail Creek Mine can now produce eight million tonnes of coking coal. Bengalla Mine is a 6.6 million tonne per year open-cut operation located about 4 kilometres (2.5 mi) west of Muswellbrook. The mine produced 5.9 million tonne of thermal coal in 2005, and has marketable reserves of 154.6 million tonnes. The Hunter Valley coal preparation plant (HVCPP) is consented to receive has a capacity of about 20 Mtpa run of mine (ROM) coal utilising dense medium cyclones and spirals. The coal preparation plants at MTW have a capacity of 9 Mtpa of feed yielding about 5.8Mtpa of saleable coal, utilising crushing, screening, dense medium separation, froth flotation.

== Vale ==
Vale's global coal business is headquartered in Australia, but includes mining operations in Australia, China, Colombia and Mozambique. In Australia, Vale operates mines in Queensland's Bowen Basin and the Hunter Valley district of New South Wales with a nominal production capacity of 8 Mtpa. Vale is also involved in continuing exploration activities with 7,000 square kilometres (2,700 sq mi) of coal exploration assets in Queensland.

=== Mines ===
Carborough Downs Mine
near Moranbah in Queensland, is a modern underground longwall operation owned 80% by Vale, with JV partners Nippon Steel 5%, POSCO 5%, Tata 5% and JFE Shoji 2.5%. Carborough Downs produces predominantly semi-hard coking coal, with a longwall mining rate on average 5.5 Mtpa ROM to yield approx 3.8 Mtpa coking coal and PCI coal. The seam is relatively uniform, ranging from 4.5 to 5.7 metres thick. Total resources 280Mt – 300Mt. (est).

Isaac Plains Mine
has a 50% ownership of the Isaac Plains Mine, 22 kilometres (14 mi) from Moranbah. Commissioned in late 2006, Isaac Plains is contract-mined and has an annual production capacity of 2.8 Mtpa of coking, PCI, and thermal coals. Commissioning of a dragline in 2010 will increase annual capacity to 4.5 Mtpa. The mine has a 15+ year life expectancy.

== Wesfarmers Coal Ltd ==
Wesfarmers Ltd is a major diversified Australian public company. Its Resources division has mining interests throughout Australia. Their coal interests include the Curragh coal mine in the Bowen Basin in Queensland (metallurgical coal for export markets and steam coal for domestic markets), the Premier coal mine at Collie in Western Australia's south west (steam coal for domestic markets), and a 40% interest in the Bengalla coal mine in the Hunter Valley of New South Wales (steam coal for both export and domestic markets).

Coal production at the Curragh mine during the 2009 March quarter totalled 2.157 million tonnes, comprising 1.451 million tonnes of metallurgical coal and 706,000 tonnes of steaming coal, down 13.5% on the previous quarter.

== Whitehaven Coal ==
A publicly listed mining company, Whitehaven Coal is currently developing and operating coal projects in the Gunnedah Region of New South Wales and exploring other opportunities.

=== Mines ===
The Group operates six open-cut mines, Blackwater, Canyon (formerly Whitehaven), Tarrawonga, Werris Creek, Rocglen (formerly Belmont) and Sunnyside and is developing the Narrabri North underground mine.

Blackwater
one of the largest open-cut coal mines in Australia, producing almost 14 million tonnes of coking and thermal coal a year. The mine is located 24 kilometres (15 mi) south of the town of Blackwater and 315 kilometres (196 mi) west of the port of Gladstone.
Canyon (formerly Whitehaven) open-cut mine
is located 15 kilometres (9.3 mi) east of Boggabri. Annual production is up to 1 million tonnes, all of which is exported.
Tarrawonga open-cut mine
commenced production in 2006. The mine is located 16 kilometres (9.9 mi) north-east of Boggabri. Mining is by truck and excavator method to produce up to 1.5 million tonnes of export coal per year.
Werris Creek open-cut mine
located 4 kilometres (2.5 mi) south of Werris Creek on the Quirindi Road. Werris Creek is mined using truck and excavator, and produces up to 1.5 Mtpa as raw coal for the export market.
Rocglen open-cut mine
(formerly Belmont Project) located 28 kilometres (17 mi) north of Gunnedah on the Wean road and commenced coal production in late 2008. Using the truck and excavator method, up to 1.5 Mtpa of coal will be trucked 30 kilometres (19 mi) by road to the Gunnedah Coal Handling and Processing Plant (CHPP) for washing & loading, then transported by rail to the Port of Newcastle.
Narrabri North underground mine
located between Boggabri and Narrabri within Mining Lease 1609. Initial production using continuous miners will be 1.5 million tonnes per year. Coal production commenced on 28 June 2010 with the train to be loaded for export to Newcastle port around the end of July 2010. Initial production would be raw coal as the Coal Washery, which is Stage 2 of the project, is yet to be built.
Sunnyside open-cut coal mine
located 15 kilometres (9.3 mi) west of Gunnedah and will produce up to 1 million tonnes per year of raw coal for the export market. Coal production commenced in late 2008.

== Glencore Holdings Pty Limited ==
Glencore (formerly Xstrata) is a major global diversified mining group, listed on the London and Swiss stock exchanges.

=== Mines ===
Bulga Open Cut, New South Wales
Located near the small towns of Bulga and broke in the Hunter Valley Bulga open cut annually produces 6.3 million tonnes of salable coal mostly consisting of high grade metallurgical coal and coaking coal
United Wambo Joint Venture Open Cut, Hunter Valley, New South Wales
United Wambo Joint Venture (UWJV) is located 15 kilometres (9.3 mi) from the town of singleton in the hunter valley. The mine is a venture between United colleries (Glencore and CFMMEU) and wambo coal (Peabody energy). UWJV produces 3.7 million tonnes of salable coal annually consisting of thermal and low-ash, semi-soft coking coal

Mangoola Open Cut, Hunter Valley, New South Wales
Mangoola Open Cut is located in the Wybong area 20 kilometres (12 mi) west of Muswellbrook and 10 kilometres (6.2 mi) north of Denman. Mangoola produces 5.6 million tonnes of thermal coal annually

Mount Owen – Glendell (MGO), Hunter Valley, New South Wales
The Mount Owen – Glendell open cut (MGO) is located 20 kilometres (12 mi) north of Singleton in the Hunter Valley. The complex consists of both Mount Owen Open Cut and Glendell Open cut which share one coal handling and processing plant (CHPP). Mount Owen was owned by Glencore but operated by Theiss Pty Ltd this was until December 2022 where Glencore took operation back and now operates the mines directly. MGO produces 6.7 million tonnes of thermal and semi-soft metallurgical coal annually

Liddell, Hunter Valley, New South Wales
Liddell Open Cut is an established open-cut coal mining operation located 25 kilometres (16 mi) from SIngleton in the Hunter Valley. Liddell produces 3.4 million tonnes of thermal and metallurgical coal annually
Ravensworth Operations, Hunter Valley, New South Wales
Located between Muswellbrook and singleton Ravensworth Operations consists of several large open cut coal mines and formally an underground mine. The complex produces 8.3 million tonnes of salable coal annually mainly consisting of thermal and metallurgical coal for export

Ulan Coal, Mudgee, New South Wales
Ulan coal is a mining complex comprising several individual mines (Ulan underground No. 3, Ulan west underground and Ulan surface operations). Together the complex has an annual production capacity of 10.7 million tonnes of salable coal consisting mainly of thermal coaking coal for export

Hunter Valley Operations, Hunter Valley, New South Wales
Hunter Valley Operations (HVO) is a large scale open cut operation located outside of Singleton. HVO is a joint venture between Yancoal (51%) and Glencore (49%). HVO produces 8.3 million tonnes of thermal and high quality semi-soft metallurgical coal

Integra Underground, Hunter Valley, New South Wales
Integra is located 12 kilometres (7.5 mi) north east of singleton. Glencore acquired the mine from Vale in 2016 as it was being placed on care and maintenance Glencore recommended restarting production to meet a hole in the market for coaking coal. Integra produces 1.1 million tonnes of coaking coal annually

== See also ==
- Coal
- Coal in Australia
- Economy of Australia
