= Goonyella railway line =

Railway line in Queensland, Australia

Goonyella Line, Queensland
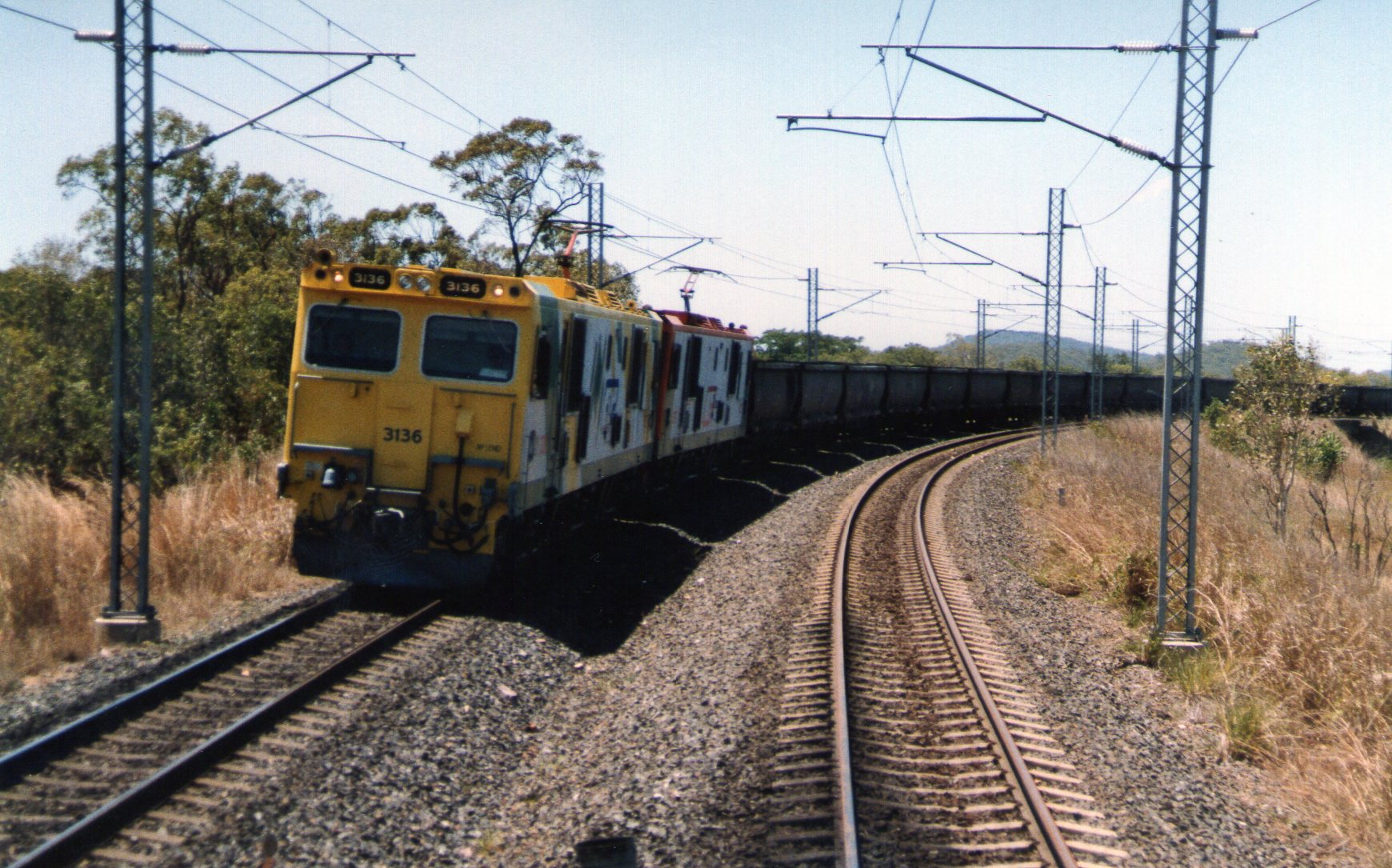
- QR electric loco 3136 (in Bicentennial paint scheme) on the Goonyella line

Overview
- Status: Operational
- Owner: Aurizon
- Locale: Queensland, Australia
- Termini: Hay Point; North Goonyella Mine
- Website: http://www.aurizon.com.au/

Service
- Type: Heavy Rail (Coal Freight)
- Operator(s): Aurizon, Pacific National, BHP Mitsubishi Alliance, East Coast Rail
- Depot(s): Jilalan

History
- Opened: 5 November 1971

Technical
- Line length: 477 km (296 mi)
- Track gauge: 1,067 mm (3 ft 6 in)
- Electrification: 25 kV 50 Hz AC OHLE
- Operating speed: 100 km/h (62 mph)

The Goonyella railway system is located in Central Queensland, Australia. It services the coal mining area of the Bowen Basin, carrying coal to the Hay Point and Dalrymple Bay Coal Terminals 20 km southeast of Mackay, as well as products to other destinations by way of connections to the North Coast Line at Yukan and the Central Line at Burngrove via the Gregory coal mine branch. It is also connected to the coal loading terminal at Abbot Point (20 km northwest of Bowen) by the GAP line. The line opened on 5 November 1971 and runs for 477 kilometres. The Goonyella system is narrow gauge 1,067 mm (3 ft 6 in) and electrified using 25 kV 50 Hz. The line has been duplicated from Hay Point to Wotonga (174 km) and features CTC signalling over the entire system.

== Mines ==
The Goonyella Coal Chain services 25 mines, carrying coal from BHP Mitsubishi Alliance, Anglo Coal, Bravus Mining & Resources, Macarthur Coal, Peabody Energy Australia, Xstrata and ANCI. The system currently operates under a demand-pull model, with rail haulages being designated by the ports, and the shipping stem.

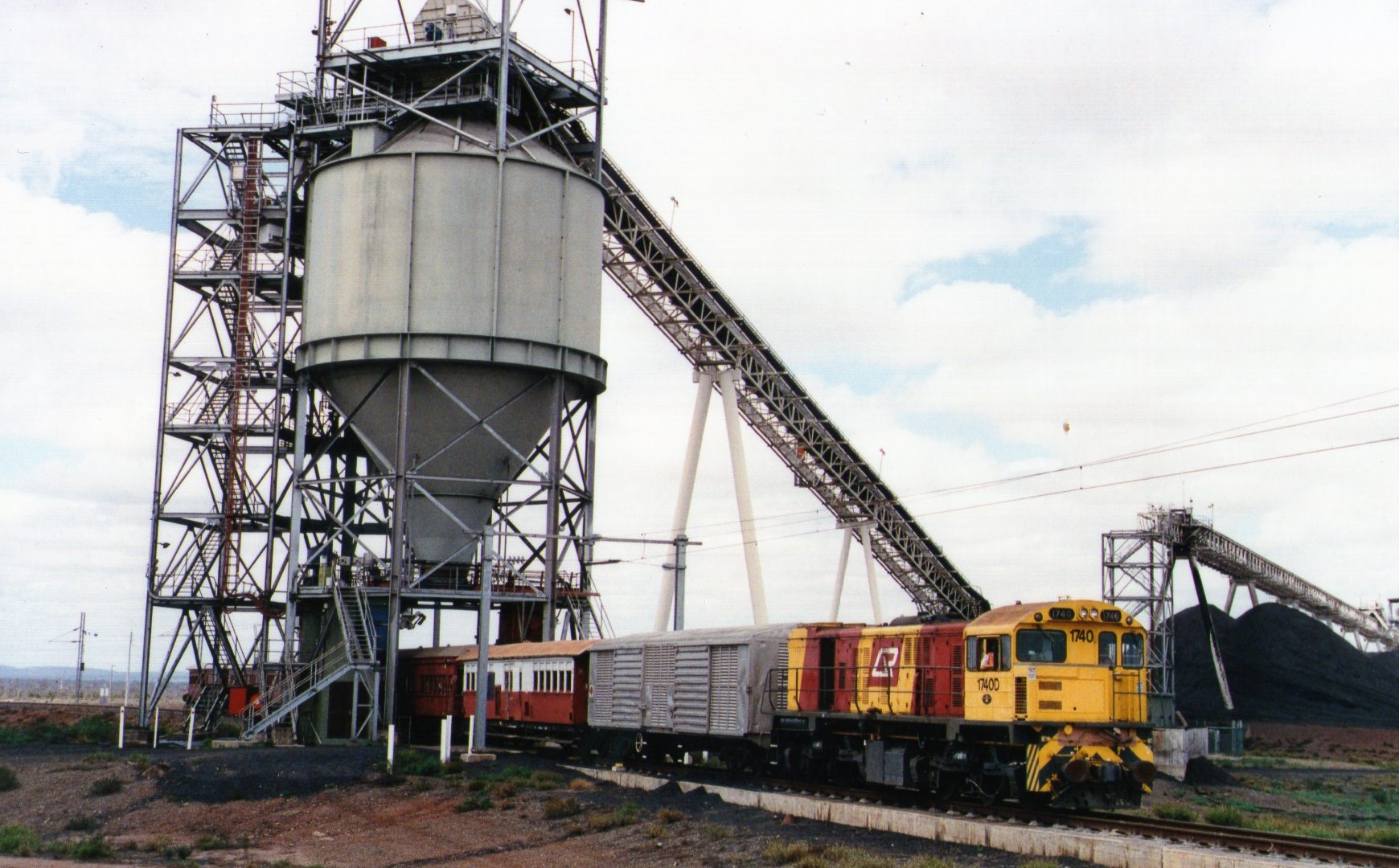
QR loco 1740 hauls a special train through a coal loading facility, Goonyella line

The rail line transports coal from the German Creek coal mine, Foxleigh coal mine, Norwich Park coal mine, Lake Vermont Mine, Saraji coal mine, Peak Downs Mine, Millennium Mine, Poitrel Mine, Moorvale Mine, Burton Downs Mine, Carborough Downs Mine, Issac Plains Mine, Moranbah North coal mine, Goonyella Riverside Mine, Hail Creek coal mine, Clermont Mine, Riverside Mine, North Goonyella coal mine, South Walker Creek coal mine, and Blair Athol coal mine.

== See also ==
- Rail transport in Queensland
