= GAP line =

Railway line in Queensland, Australia

Newlands Railway System
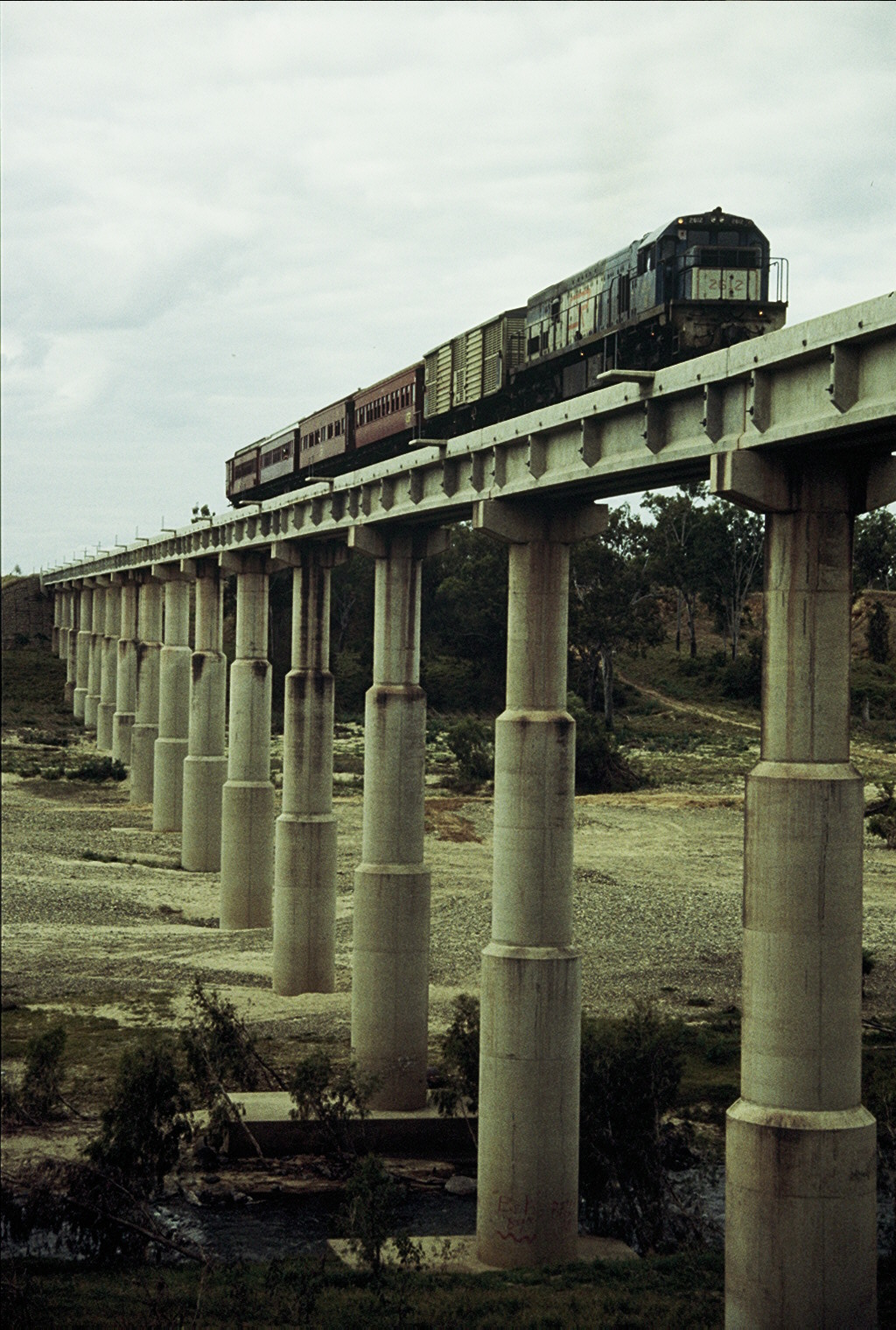
- QR loco 2612 hauls a special train over the Bowen River bridge on the Newlands line, September 1989

Overview
- Other name: Goonyella – Abbot Point (GAP) line
- Owner: Aurizon
- Termini: Abbot Point; North Goonyella

Service
- Operator(s): Aurizon

Technical
- Track gauge: 1,067 mm (3 ft 6 in)
- Signalling: RCS from Abbot Point to Collinsville; DTC from Collinsville to North Goonyella
- Train protection system: None

The Collinsville – Newlands – North Goonyella line, also known as the Goonyella – Abbot Point (GAP) line and the Newlands railway system, is a railway line in Queensland, Australia. It was opened in a series of sections between 1922 and 2012. It commences at Merinda, near Bowen and extends south to North Goonyella coal mine, connecting to the Goonyella railway line. The nearby 13 km line from Kaili to Abbot Point is considered part of the GAP system.

== History ==
The Bowen Basin is today recognised as the largest coal resource in Australia, but its relative remoteness resulted in a lack of priority for a line that would facilitate development of the coalfield. A line was proposed from Bowen to the 'Bowen Coalfield' in 1884, and funding allocated, but the funds were diverted to the Townsville-Ayr railway line when a surveyor described the coal as 'worthless'.

Mining commenced in 1912 at Collinsville, and then in a relatively modest fashion. Coal was being shipped to Townsville and railed to customers due to a lack of efficient transport from Collinsville. The Queensland government was keen to source a local supply of coal for the northern region of the state, and built the line from Merinda, 7 km west of Bowen on the North Coast Line (NCL), 77 km to Collinsville, which opened in 1922.

A 7.6 km private tramway (built to QR standard) junctioning from just south of the Collinsville railway station connected to the Scottsville mine opened in the same year, and also served the cattle yards. A 1.5 km spur to the Dacon mine also opened in 1922, and closed in 1983.

Coal began to be railed to Mount Isa in the 1930s, a distance of 1,230 kilometres (760 mi). The line was upgraded in conjunction with the Mount Isa railway line in the 1960s as coal volumes grew in line with the expansion of the Mount Isa mines and smelters, enabling 2,000 ton trains hauled by two main line diesels to be introduced.

=== Newlands extension ===
In 1978, a mine was proposed at Newlands, and in 1984 a 73 km extension opened to serve the mine. At the same time a new export shipping terminal was built at Abbot Point, with a 13 km line to it junctioning at Kaili on the NCL, 8 km west of Merinda. This included a line bypassing Merinda, though the original line remains.

The original Collinsville section was rebuilt at the same time and the Scottville line was replaced by a new alignment, the terminal called McNaugton in honour of a former mine manager. The Abbot Point to Newlands section now features 53 kg/m rail on concrete sleepers, a 20 tonne axle load, a 1 in 50 (2%) maximum grade and 240 m minimum radius curves. The maximum speed is 80 km/h.

A balloon loop loading facility known as Sonoma was opened 7 km south of Collinsville in 2008. It was built for an axle load of 26.5 tonnes.

=== GAP extension ===
As coal mine development in the Bowen Basin accelerated in the early 2000s, Abbot Point was seen as having available loading capacity that could be used if mines on the Goonyella system could access it. This resulted in the line from Newlands being extended 68 km to North Goonyella coal mine, known as the Goonyella – Abbot Point (GAP) project (also sometimes referred to as the Northern Missing Link), opening in 2012. This section was built with 60 kg/m rail, a maximum grade of 1 in 55 (~1.8%), and a maximum axle load of 26.5 tonnes, the same as the Goonyella system.

The Newlands line was proposed for electrification in 1983, but that was deferred in 1986 in lieu of the NCL between Caboolture and Gladstone. A review by Aurizon, the private operator of the line, indicates that electrification could be justified if tonnage reaches 70–80 Mtpa, current haulage being ~50M tonnes per annum.

== See also ==
- Rail transport in Queensland
