= Chris Wallin =

Australian geologist and businessman

- Education: Brisbane State High School
- Alma mater: University of Queensland
- Occupation: Geologist
- Known for: QCoal Group

Chris Wallin is an Australian geologist and businessman. He is the Managing Director of QCoal Group and Chairman of the QCoal Foundation.

== Early life ==
Chris Wallin grew up in Moorooka, a suburb of Brisbane. His father was born in Eidsvold, Queensland and fought in World War II. He attended Brisbane State High School and was interested in rocks, minerals and soils from a young age. He was awarded a scholarship to attended the University of Queensland and graduated with a Bachelor of Science in Geology.

== Career ==
After graduation from university, he worked as a geologist for the Department of Mines and Energy of the Government of Queensland. Wallin discovered coal deposits throughout Queensland. In 1989 he founded QCoal for the purpose of developing these deposits into operating mines. QCoal mines coal from a number of mines in the Bowen Basin, including the Sonoma mine, Drake mine and Byerwen mine.

== Personal life ==
He lives in The Gap, a suburb of Brisbane. In 2013 he partnered with the Royal Flying Doctor Service to deliver a mobile dental service to provide free dental health care to communities across central and northern Queensland.

=== Net worth ===
In January 2019 Forbes estimated Wallin's net worth as US$910 million. As of May 2025, Wallin's net worth was assessed by the Financial Review on the 2025 Financial Review Rich List as A$2.06 billion.

Year	Financial Review Rich List		Forbes Australia's 50 Richest	
Year	Rank	Net worth (A$)	Rank	Net worth (US$)
2017		$1.13 billion		
2018	34 ▲	$1.79 billion ▲		
2019	42 ▼	$1.88 billion ▲	41 ▲	$910 million ▲
2020	70 ▼	$1.43 billion ▼		
2021	78 ▼	$1.45 billion ▲		
2022				
2023				
2024		$1.80 billion		
2025	81	$2.06 billion ▲		

Legend
Icon	Description
Steady	Has not changed from the previous year
▲	Has increased from the previous year
▼	Has decreased from the previous year
