= Oaky Creek coal mine =

Oaky Creek Coal Mine
- Location: 17 km east-southeast of Tieri, Queensland, Australia
- Products: Coking coal
- Opened: 1983
- Company: Xstrata, Sumisho, Itochu, ICRA OC.

The Oaky Creek Coal Mine is a coal mine located 17 kilometres east-southeast of Tieri in the Bowen Basin in Central Queensland, Australia. The mine has coal reserves amounting to 288 million tonnes of coking coal, one of the largest coal reserves in Asia and the world. The mine has an annual production capacity of 11 million tonnes of coal. Oaky Creek is one of Australia's highest producing coal mines over a period of several years. It was opened in 1983. At this stage MIM Holdings held a 79% shareholding.

The mine contains two underground operations and a coal preparation plant. It is a joint venture between Xstrata, Sumisho, Itochu and ICRA OC.

Mining operations by open cut dragline began in the site in 1982. Mining began at the first underground mine in 1989 with coal from a second mine being produced in February 1999. Open cut operations finished at Oaky Creek in 2006. Oaky Number 1 Underground closed in 2017, leaving only Oaky North Underground still mining coal.

In 2013, coal production was cut by 2 million tonnes as global thermal coal prices fell and the market was heavily over supplied.

Coal from the mine is transported to Hay Point via the Goonyella railway line.

== See also ==
- Coal in Australia
- List of mines in Australia
