= Acacia fodinalis =

Scientific classification
- Kingdom: Plantae
- Clade: Tracheophytes
- Clade: Angiosperms
- Clade: Eudicots
- Clade: Rosids
- Order: Fabales
- Family: Fabaceae
- Subfamily: Caesalpinioideae
- Clade: Mimosoid clade
- Genus: Acacia
- Species: A. fodinalis

Binomial name
- Acacia fodinalis Pedley
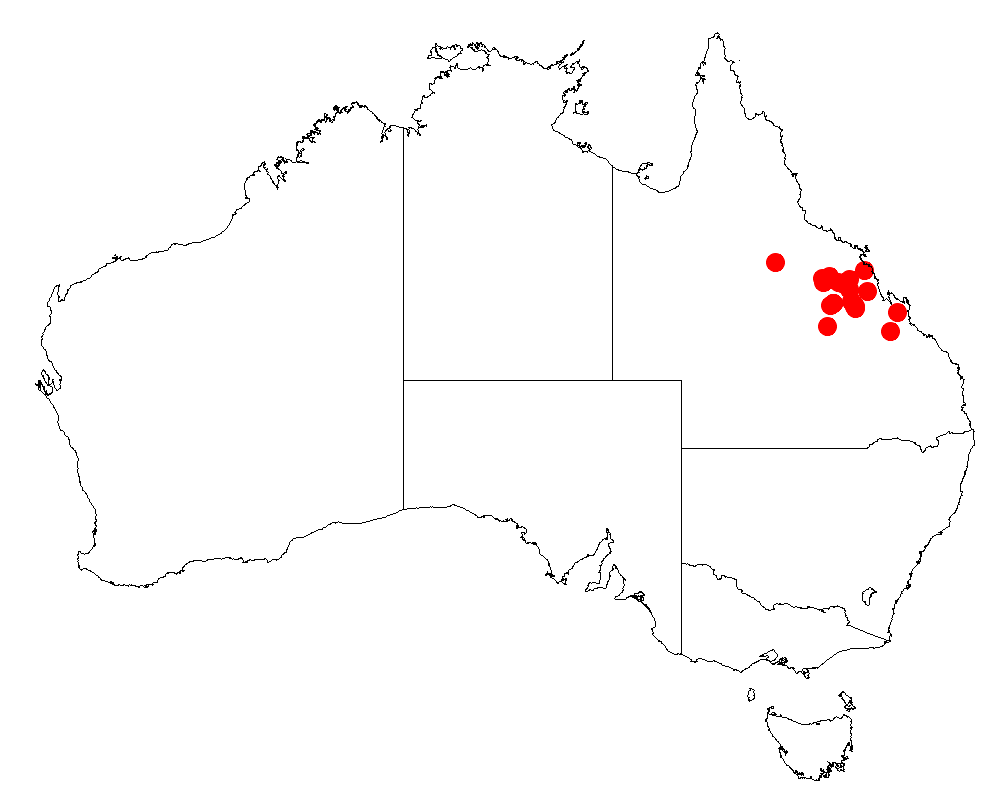
- Occurrence data from AVH

Synonyms
- Acacia sp. (Norwich Park J.Martin AQ349851); Racosperma fodinale (Pedley) Pedley

Species of legume

Acacia fodinalis is a species of flowering plant in the family Fabaceae and is endemic to central eastern Queensland, Australia. It is a tree with glabrous, reddish branchlets, mostly glabrous, sickle-shaped phyllodes, spikes of golden yellow flowers and linear pods prominently raised over the seeds.

== Description ==
Acacia fodinalis is a tree that typically grows to a height of 4–10 m (13–33 ft) and has glabrous, reddish branchlets that are resinous when young. Its phyllodes are mostly shallowly sickle-shaped, tapered equally at both ends, 85–130 mm (3.3–5.1 in) long and 8–15 mm (0.31–0.59 in) wide and glabrous with crowded, parallel veins with two or three main veins, yellow or brownish pulvinus and a prominent gland up to 1 mm (0.039 in) above the pulvinus. The flowers are borne in rather open, golden yellow spikes 40–70 mm (1.6–2.8 in) long on a peduncle mostly 7–10 mm (0.28–0.39 in) long. Flowering occurs from June to September, and the pods are linear, up to 45 mm (1.8 in) long and 2.3–3.0 mm (0.091–0.118 in) wide, dark brown, glabrous, prominently raised over the seeds and slightly constricted between them. The seeds are light brown, about 3.5 mm (0.14 in) long with a yellow, cup-shaped aril.

== Taxonomy ==
Acacia fodinalis was first formally described in 1999 by Leslie Pedley in the journal Austrobaileya from specimens collected near the Norwich Park coal mine in 1983. The specific epithet (fodinalis) means 'pertaining to or belonging to a pit or mine', "alluding to the large collieries in the geographic range of the species".

== Distribution and habitat ==
This species of wattle is endemic to central eastern Queensland where it is found in the upper portion on the Isaac River watershed and adjacent parts of the Belyando River catchment where it usually grows on floodplains and riverbanks growing in sandy soils in Eucalyptus woodland, usually with Eucalyptus crebra.

== Conservation status ==
Acacia fodinalis is listed as of "least concern" under the Queensland Government Nature Conservation Act 1992.

== See also ==
- List of Acacia species
