= German Creek coal mine =

Mine in Queensland, Australia

German Creek Coal Mine
- Location in Queensland
- Location: Middlemount, Queensland, Australia; 22°54′35″S 148°33′57″E
- Products: Coking coal
- Opened: 1981
- Company: Capcoal, Mitsui Coal Holdings Australia

The German Creek Coal Mine is an underground coal mine 25 kilometres south west of Middlemount in Central Queensland, Australia. The mine has coal reserves amounting to 248 million tonnes of coking coal, one of the largest coal reserves in Asia and the world. The mine has an annual production capacity of 6 million tonnes of coal.

The German Creek Formation lies within the Bowen Basin and is noted for containing hard coking coal of exceptionally high quality. The mine is co-owned by Capcoal and Mitsui Coal Holdings Australia. It is operated by Capcoal and employs around 700 people.

Open-cut mining operations began in 1981. Underground mining along the same coal seam started at the Southern Colliery in 1988.

Waste methane gas is collected at the mine and used to generate electricity. The maximum capacity of the power station is 45 MW. Operations at the plant began in November 2006.

Coal from the mine is transport to Hay Point for export via the Goonyella railway line.

As was the case with many Queensland mines, production was reduced after the 2010–11 Queensland floods.

== See also ==
- Coal mining in Australia
- List of mines in Australia
