= Blackwater coal mine =

Mine in Queensland, Australia

- Interactive map of Blackwater coal mine
- Location: Stewarton, Queensland, Australia; 23.6838°S 48.8118°E
- Products: Coking coal
- Opened: 1967
- Closed: Still in Operation
- Company: BHP Mitsubishi Alliance 1967 - 2024 Whitehaven Coal 2024 - Present
- Acquired: 2024

The Blackwater coal mine is an Open Cut Coal mine located in the Bowen Basin in Central Queensland, Australia. It is south of the town of Blackwater in Stewarton, Central Highlands Region. The mine has coal reserves amounting to 877 million tonnes of coking coal, one of the largest coal reserves in Australia and the world, and has a strike length of 80 kilometres, the open pit being 35 kilometres long. It is owned by Whitehaven Coal and is expected to have an average annual production capacity of 12.4 million tonnes of saleable coal.

It has the largest dragline fleet of 7 in the Southern Hemisphere.

Both HCC (Hard Coking Coal) and SSCC (Semi Soft Coking Coal) metallurgical coal products are mined at Blackwater.

The remaining Life Of Mine production is expected to be greater than 50 years. Blackwater’s coal products are exported to customers across Asia through the RG Tanna Terminal north of Gladstone

External videos
- Coal Blasting in 2008

The mine won the 2006 Mine of the Year award at the Australian Mining Prospect Awards.

== History ==
The mine was established by the Utah Development Company in 1967. Mining operations at South Blackwater mine were incorporated into Blackwater coal mine in late 2000. In 2007, a new coal handling preparation allowed for a significant increase in production.

In August 2022, BHP sought federal approval for a new mine, an extension of the Blackwater mine, but named Blackwater South, to run until 2112, 90 years hence.

In October 2023 Whitehaven Coal has executed definitive sale agreements with BHP Group and Mitsubishi Development Pty Ltd (together, BMA) to acquire 100% of both the Daunia and Blackwater coal mines in Queensland, Australia, for an aggregate consideration of $3.2 billion.

== See also ==
- Blackwater railway system
- Coal in Australia
