= Saraji coal mine =

Mine in Queensland, Australia

Coordinates: 22°24′24″S 148°17′20″E

Saraji Coal Mine
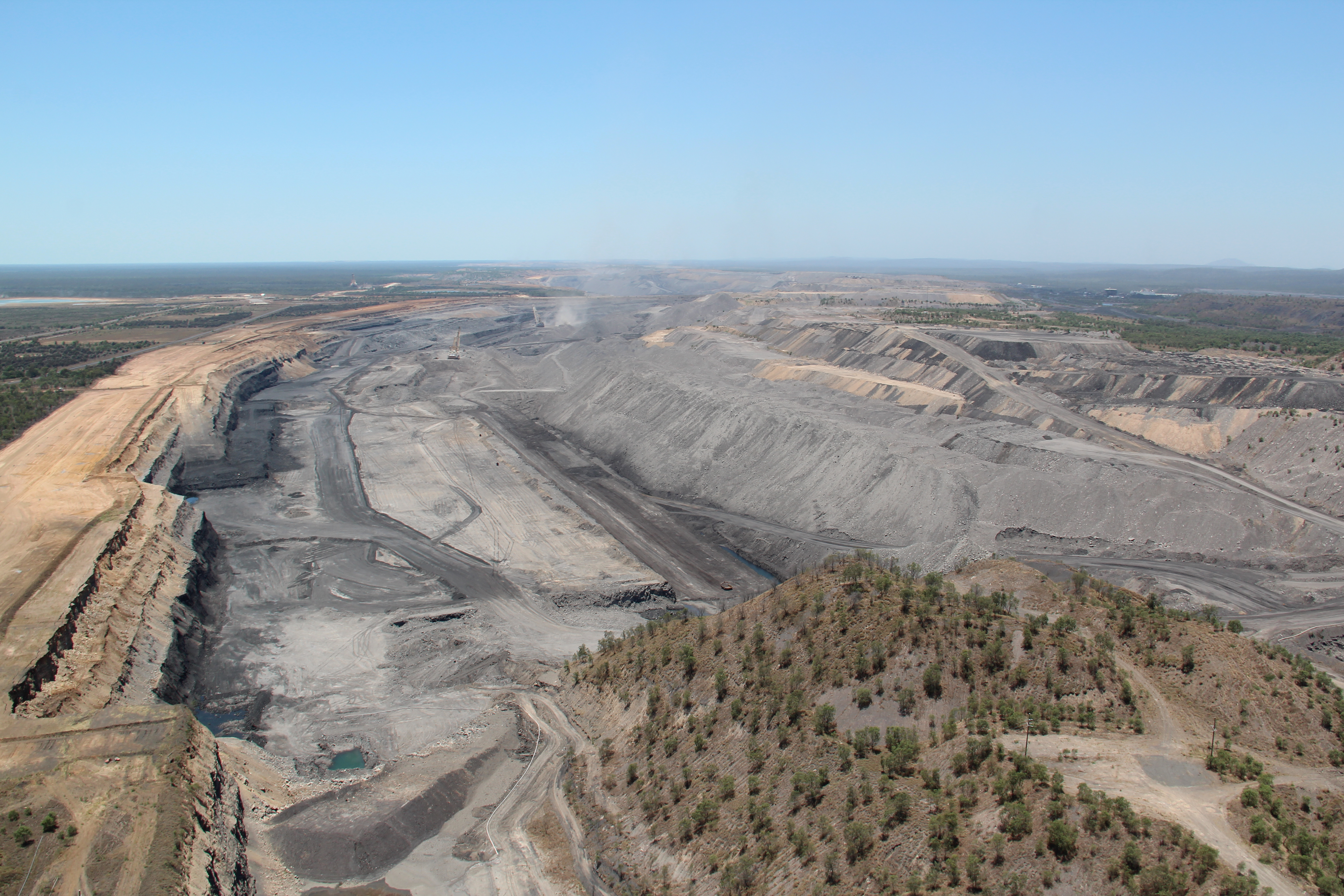
- Saraji coal mine, 2012
- Interactive map of Saraji Coal Mine
- Location: Dysart, Queensland, Australia
- Products: Coking coal
- Opened: 1974
- Company: BHP Mitsubishi Alliance

The Saraji Coal Mine is a coal mine located near Dysart in the Central Queensland region of Australia. The mine has coal reserves amounting to 648 million tonnes of coking coal, one of the largest coal reserves in the world. The mine has an annual production capacity of 10 million tonnes of coal. It is located in the Bowen Basin, an area with significant coal deposits and numerous mines. It is owned by the BHP Mitsubishi Alliance (BMA).

Saraji mine utilises open-cast extraction methods. It has a total of 11 coal seams. The strikes are on average four km wide and extend for 30 km in a north–south orientation.

Coal is processed via a CHPP (Coal Handling and Processing Plant) consisting of three stages: Coarse – DMCs, Fines – Reflux Classifier, and Ultrafines – Flotation.

External videos
- Biggest Digger in the World
- Flying over Saraji Mine in Central Queensland

Prestripping of 42 million cubic metres of overburden each year is conducted by the HSE Group.

Coal is exported via the Goonyella railway line.

== History ==
Construction work at the site begin in 1972 with the first coal produced in 1974. In 2009, the mine won the People's Choice Award for its feeder blockage removal device at the Queensland Mining Industry Health and Safety Conference.

Miners at Saraji and six other BMA mines went on strike in February 2012 over working conditions. Work stoppages commenced in 2011. Meetings between union members and BMA began in December 2010.

On 15 January 2024 a worker at the mine was killed after being pinned between two vehicles.

== See also ==
- Coal in Australia
- List of mines in Australia
- Construction, Forestry, Mining and Energy Union v BHP Coal Pty Ltd
