= Rolleston coal mine =

Mine in Queensland, Australia

Rolleston Coal Mine
- Interactive map of Rolleston Coal Mine
- Location: 16 km west of Rolleston, Queensland, Australia; 24°26′43.4″S 148°24′58.522″E
- Products: Thermal coal
- Opened: 2005
- Company: Glencore
- Acquired: 2003

The Rolleston Coal Mine is an open-cut coal mine located in Central Queensland, Australia, with reserves amounting to 600 million tonnes of thermal coal. The mine has an annual production capacity of 14 million tonnes. It is one of numerous coal mines in the Bowen Basin.

The mine is wholly owned by Glencore.

Xstrata acquired it from Mount Isa Mines in 2003, proceeded with development, and began mining operations in 2005. Glencore merged with Xstrata in 2013. Winfield Energy acquired the 12.5% interest formerly held by Itochu in February 2019. Glencore acquired Winfield Energy's 12.5% in January 2021 and Sumitomo's 12.5% later that year, giving it 100% ownership.

Rolleston Mine is approved to produce six million tonnes per year for export and two million for domestic use. Coal is exported from the mine via the Port of Gladstone. The majority of the mine's haulage is conducted under contract by Aurizon using electric locomotives. Coal from the mine is also used to power the Gladstone Power Station.

== Floods ==
Excess water filled the mine pits in 2010, affecting production, and the mine was forced to declare force majeure after the 2010–2011 Queensland floods affected rail operations.

== Expansion ==
An application to expand the mine was made to the federal government on 17 May 2011. The mine is located within the Fitzroy River basin which flows into the Coral Sea. An expansion of mining operations may indirectly affect the Great Barrier Reef Marine Park through sedimentation and the pollution of waterways. The expansion would lift production almost threefold to between 15 and 20 million tonnes a year.

== See also ==
- Coal in Australia
- List of mines in Australia
