= South Walker Creek coal mine =

Mine in Queensland, Australia

Coordinates: 21°44′21″S 148°24′48″E

South Walker Creek Coal Mine
- Interactive map of South Walker Creek Coal Mine
- Location: 40 km west of Nebo, Queensland, Australia
- Products: Coking coal
- Company: Stanmore Resources Limited

The South Walker Creek Coal Mine is an Open Cut coal mine in Strathfield, Isaac Region, Central Queensland region of Australia. The mine has coal reserves amounting to 298 million tonnes of coking coal, one of the largest coal reserves in Asia and the world. As at 2012, the mine had an annual production capacity of 3.6 million tonnes of coal.

External videos
- Dragline

South Walker Creek mine is located 40 km west of Nebo within the Bowen Basin. Exports travel to port via the Goonyella railway line. The mine is owned by Stanmore Resources Pty Ltd.

South Walker Creek mine is the site of a significant megafauna fossils. 20 ancient species have been discovered at the mine.

== See also ==
- Coal in Australia
- List of mines in Australia
