= Hail Creek coal mine =

Mine in Queensland, Australia

Hail Creek Coal Mine
- Location in Queensland
- Location: Hail Creek, Queensland, Australia; 21°29′27″S 148°21′51″E
- Products: Coking coal
- Opened: 2003
- Company: Queensland Coal and joint venture partners

The Hail Creek Coal Mine is a coal mine located within the Bowen Basin at Hail Creek in the Isaac Region, Central Queensland, Australia. The mine has coal reserves amounting to 970 million tonnes of coking coal, one of the largest coal reserves in Asia and the world. The mine has an annual production capacity of 5.5 million tonnes of coal. In 2011, seven million tonnes of coal were produced. The mine is operated by Glencore Australia and owned by Queensland Coal, Nippon Steel Australia, Marubeni Coal and Sumisho Coal Development.

Resources at the site were originally discovered in 1968. Construction of the Hail Creek mine began in 2001. Production at the open-cut mine began in 2003. Extraction is done by the dragline, truck and shovel method. Two seams are mined. These are the Elphinstone Seam, average thickness of 6.4 metres and Hynds Seam, averaging 8.3 metres in thickness. Coal is exported via the Goonyella railway line.

In early 2011, production was halted ahead of Cyclone Yasi. As a result of severe monsoon rain force majeure was declared and not lifted at Hail Creek until May 2011.

In February 2013, the operators of the mine were fined $2,200 for a breach of environmental guidelines when it released water from the mine. The relatively low penalty was criticised as a slap on the wrist.

Glencore began operational management of Hail Creek mine from 1 August 2018 after the completion of a deal that saw Glencore acquire Rio Tinto’s 82% interest in the Hail Creek coal mine and adjacent coal resources, as well as its 71.2% interest in the Valeria coal resource.

In 2021, satellite observations estimated that the Hail Creek coal mine emits 20% of all Australian methane emissions released by coal mining, while accounting for only 1% of the national coal production. The team having conducted the research suggested a large underreporting in the national inventory.

== See also ==
- Coal mining in Australia
- List of mines in Australia
