= Curragh coal mine =

Mine in Queensland, Australia

Coordinates: 23°28′01″S 148°51′11″E

Curragh Coal Mine
- Dragline, 2008
- Interactive map of Curragh Coal Mine
- Location: Queensland, Australia
- Products: Coking coal
- Company: Coronado Global Resources

The Curragh Coal Mine is an open-cut, coal mine located 30 km north of Blackwater, Queensland, Australia. The mine has coal reserves amounting to 88 million tonnes of coking coal, one of the largest coal reserves in Asia and the world. The mine had an annual production capacity of 7 million tonnes of coal. The mine covers 12,600 ha of the Rangal Coal measures in the Bowen Basin.

In 2012, production at the mine was increased to 8.5 million tonnes a year. Later in the year operations changed from seven days per week to five.

The mine was previously owned by Wesfarmers and has an expected mine life to 2025. Overburden is removed by Thiess.

In 2017, Coronado Coal Group purchased Curragh Coal Mine from Wesfarmers. Since this purchase the company has worked to maximize operational performance.

In December 2024, Curragh underground expansion project, Mammoth Underground, mined first coal, ramping up to a production rate of 1.5 – 2.0 Mtpa in 2025. Mammoth is an underground bord and pillar operation, gaining access to 41 million ROM tonnes of met coal reserves via the existing open cut pit highwall in S-Pit.

In 2025, the Curragh team declared to have successfully shaved over $100 million in costs, with group-wide efficiency improvements exceeding $200 million

Exports from the mine leave the country via the Blackwater railway system and the Port of Gladstone. Some of the coal is used to produce electricity at the Stanwell Power Station.

== Incidents ==
In January 2020, a 33-year-old worker was killed after being trapped under heavy machinery at the mine. A number of charges relating to the incident were laid by the Office of the Work Health and Safety Prosecutor under the Coal Mining Safety and Health Act 1999. Another worker was fatally injured at the mine in November 2021.

== See also ==
- Coal in Australia
- List of mines in Australia
