= Centurion Coal Mine =

Coal mine in Queensland, Australia

- Location in Queensland
- Location: Moranbah, Queensland, Australia; 21°39′50″S 147°58′00″E
- Products: Coking coal
- Opened: 1994
- Company: Peabody Energy
- Acquired: 2004

Centurion Coal Mine, formerly known as North Goonyella, is an underground coal mine located near Moranbah in the Bowen Basin, Queensland, Australia. The recently reopened mine is planned to have an annual production capacity of 4.7 million tonnes of coal, with a total reserve of 140 million tonnes and a planned life of over 25 years as of 2025.

Water used by the mine is sourced from Burton Gorge Dam. The mine is serviced by the Goonyella railway line and from December 2011 the GAP railway line.

== Project History ==
Early exploration in the area was carried out by the former Mines Department of Queensland, and by the Utah Development Company as part of its regional exploration of the Bowen Basin in the early to mid-1960s. Utah's early exploration was focused on proving large open cut resources. As most of the coal resources were only feasible for underground mining, the area was relinquished by Utah at the time it applied for a mining permit for the neighbouring Goonyella Mine.

After an extensive exploration program, the lease to develop the underground mine was granted in 1991 to a Joint Venture of White Mining Ltd (a subsidiary of White Industries Ltd) and Sumisho Coal Developments (a subsidiary of Sumitomo Corporation). The mine commenced longwall coal production in 1994. Sumitomo later acquired White's share of the Joint Venture to become sole owners of the mine. In September 2000 the mine was sold by Sumitomo Corporation to a RAG and Thiess 60/40 joint venture. In January 2003, RAG took full ownership after Thiess sold its stake in the project.

North Goonyella was acquired by Peabody Energy in 2004. The site consisted of an open-cut mine known as Eaglefield and an underground mine called North Goonyella. The two operations shared the same coal handling and preparation plant. The open-cut mine has since closed and the current mining is solely underground.

== 2018 Mine Fire ==
On 1 September 2018, North Goonyella mine was evacuated due to elevated levels gas in the underground mine workings and concerns over a possible developing mine fire. Over the following month, despite control and containment efforts, the fire eventually burned uncontrollably, with black smoke rising from the main fan shaft by 27 September. The mine was forced to close while reentry was reassessed.

In a 2021 US-based class action lawsuit against Peabody by shareholders, it was alleged by former employees that the mine had a 'culture of cutting corners', and had acted with error during the incident, including drilling ventilation holes into the wrong side of the mine. It was also alleged that Peabody was slow to report the incident to shareholders and regulators, misled shareholders and made “materially false and misleading statements and omissions” about the severity of the fire and the timeline of likely re-entry into the mine.

== Project Rename and Mine Reentry ==
Following the post-fire mine closure, Peabody committed to spending more than AU$760 million to enable reentry to the mine. This includes an overhaul of infrastructure including a new longwall miner and upgrades to existing ventilation and conveyors. During this time, Peabody also purchased a portion of Wards Well, an adjacent mining lease, from mining company Stanmore for US$136 million. This would add a further 25-year mine life to the combined project. Peabody then rebranded the former North Goonyella and the newly acquired Wards Well projects into a combined Centurion Coal, their company's flagship metallurgical coal asset.

Mine reentry into Centurion was achieved in 2024 with the first coal shipment from the reopened mine being achieved the same year. Peabody forecasts high-volume longwall production to be achieved in 2026, with a projected annual production of 4.7 million tonnes of ROM coal.

== See also ==
- Coal mining in Australia
- List of mines in Australia
