= Whitehaven Coal =

Australian coal mining company

- Traded as: ASX: WHC
- Industry: Coal mining
- Founded: February 1999
- Headquarters: Sydney, Australia
- Key people: Mark Vaile (Chairman); Paul Flynn (CEO)
- Revenue: $1.7 billion (2020)
- Operating income: $306 million (2020)
- Website: www.whitehavencoal.com.au

Whitehaven Coal is an Australian coal mining company.

== History ==
Whitehaven Coal was established in February 1999. In September 2000, mining operations commenced at the Canyon open cut mine near Gunnedah. Further mines were established at Werris Creek in September 2005 and Tarrawonga in June 2006 before the company listed on the Australian Securities Exchange in June 2007.

In June 2011, Whitehaven was granted approval to operate trains in its own right by the Australian Rail Track Corporation to the Port of Newcastle via the Main Northern railway line. In 2012, Nathan Tinkler made an unsuccessful attempt to take over the company. In 2015, the Maules Creek coal mine opened. The project was controversial and opposed by a coalition for traditional owners, farmers and environmentalists.

In October 2023, Whitehaven entered an agreement with BHP Mitsubishi Alliance to acquire the Blackwater and Daunia coal mines in Queensland. The acquisition was completed in April 2024. In August 2024, Whitehaven announced it would sell a 20% and 10% stake in the Blackwater mine to Nippon Steel and JFE Steel, respectively.

== Assets ==
=== Current ===
- Werris Creek mine, opened 2005, 100% shareholding
- Tarrawaonga coal mine, opened 2006, 100% shareholding
- Sunnyside coal mine, opened 2008, closed 2012, reopened 2017, 100% ownership
- Narrabri coal mine, opened 2012, 78% shareholding
- Maules Creek coal mine, opened 2015, 75% shareholding
- Daunia coal mine, purchased 2025, 100% ownership
- Blackwater coal mine, purchased 2025, 100% ownership

=== Former ===
- Canyon coal mine, opened 2000, closed 2009, 100% ownership
- Rocglen coal mine, opened 2008, closed 2019, 100% ownership
