= Goonyella Riverside Mine =

Mine in Queensland, Australia

- Location in Australia
- Location: Moranbah, Queensland, Australia; 21°45′32″S 147°58′37″E
- Products: Coking coal
- Production: 17,100,000 Tonnes / Year
- Opened: 1971
- Company: BHP Mitsubishi Alliance

Goonyella Riverside Mine is a large open cut coking coal mine in the Bowen Basin. It is one of many coal mines in Central Queensland, Australia and is located at Moranbah about 30 km north of the township. The mine produced 12.4 million tonnes of metallurgical coal from July 2012 to June 2013. In 2019 this figure was 17.1 million tonnes.

It is owned by BHP Mitsubishi Alliance. The Goonyella Upper Seam, the Goonyella Middle Seam and the Goonyella Lower Seam are all mined at the site. The coal is well known for its great coking characteristics. Much of the coal was such a high grade, the wash plants were often programmed to add ash to meet the contracted export quality targets.

== History ==
The Goonyella Mine was developed by Central Queensland Coal Associates, (Utah International Corporation 85% and Mitsubishi Development Co 15%) before being sold to BHP. Operations commenced in 1971 at Goonyella while mining began at Riverside in 1982. The Riverside deposit became depleted in 2005.

On 12 November 2019, BMA Operations announced that it would automate 86 Komatsu Trucks by 2020. The announcement was openly criticised by the CFMEU Mining & Energy Division and the Queensland Opposition Leader Deb Frecklington who stated that approvals to the mine operation should be reviewed.

The mine is colour coded to "Goonyella Green", and the haul trucks were given names of racehorses.

Coal is exported by the Goonyella railway line via Hay Point to markets worldwide.

== Safety ==
The mine has recorded four fatal accidents since 1990. Queensland miner Tyrone Buckton died in 2018 after being diagnosed with silicosis which is caused by high levels of exposure to silica dust.

== See also ==
- Coal mining in Australia
- List of mines in Australia
