= Coppabella coal mine =

Mine in Queensland, Australia

Coppabella Coal Mine
- Location in Queensland

Location
- Location: Queensland, Australia; 21°51′30″S 148°26′30″E

Production
- Products: Coking coal

History
- Opened: 1998

Owner
- Company: joint venture with Peabody Energy as majority owner

The Coppabella Coal Mine is an open-cut coal mine located in Strathfield, Isaac Region, Central Queensland, Australia. It lies in the eastern part of the Bowen Basin near the towns of Nebo and Moranbah. The coal is dated to the Late Permian age and are located within the Rangal Coal Measures.

The mine has coal reserves amounting to 227 million tonnes of coking coal, one of the largest coal reserves supplying Asia and the world. The mine has an annual production capacity of 4.2 million tonnes of coal. The average seam thickness of about ten metres.

The mine is jointly owned by Peabody Energy, CITIC Resources, Marubeni, Sojitz, Nippon Steel and others. Mining is conducted by dragline and pre-strip operation. Operations began on 1 June 1998. 850 tonnes of coal per hour is able to be washed at the coal handling and preparation plant.

There are four pits in operation; Johnson, South, Creek and East Pits.

Coal exports leave the country via the Goonyella railway line and the Dalrymple Bay Coal terminal at Hay Point.

Coppabella was one of numerous Queensland mines closed during the 2010–11 Queensland floods.

== See also ==
- Coal in Australia
