= Moranbah North coal mine =

Mine in Queensland, Australia

Moranbah North Coal Mine
- Location within Queensland
- Location: Moranbah, Queensland, Australia; 21°58′41″S 148°0′24″E
- Products: Coking coal
- Company: Anglo American Australia (88%) and joint venture partners

The Moranbah North Coal Mine is a coal mine in the Bowen Basin at Moranbah in Central Queensland, Australia. The mine has coal reserves amounting to 261 million tonnes of coking coal, one of the largest coal reserves in the world. The mine has an annual production capacity of 8 million tonnes of coal. Most of the coal is exported and used to produce iron and steel in Asia but also to India, Brazil and Europe via the Goonyella railway line to Hay Point.

The longwall mining operations at the mine began in 1998. Extraction occurs roughly 200 metres below the surface. Operations are expected to continue until around 2033.

The mine is owned by Anglo American Australia and several joint partners. Methane gas extracted from the mine powers the Moranbah North Power Station.

== History ==
In April 2007, underground miner Jason Blee was killed after being pinned to a side wall by a shuttle car. The mine successfully trialed an innovative shotcrete concrete chemical mixture in 2012. In 2013, Moranbah North Coal Mine received the Coal Mine of the Year Award at the 10th annual Australian Mining Prospect Awards. In February 2019, an underground miner, Bradley Hardwick was killed and other miners were injured when the grader he was operating rolled down the mine drift. In March 2022, a miner was killed after being struck in the head by machinery.

In March 2025, the mine experienced a significant fire originally believed to be triggered by elevated carbon monoxide levels but was later thought to have been caused by an underground explosion, prompting a full emergency evacuation and a temporary suspension of operations. Peabody Energy, which had announced plans to acquire the metallurgical coal assets of Anglo-American, terminated the deal following the incident, citing a material adverse change. Peabody then sought to renegotiate for a lower price, but the attempt failed.

== See also ==
- Coal mining in Australia
