= QCoal =

Australian mining company

QCoal Group
- Type: Private
- Industry: Mining
- Founded: 1989
- Headquarters: Brisbane, Australia
- Area served: Queensland
- Services: Coal exploration and mining
- Owner: Chris Wallin
- Website: www.qcoal.com.au

QCoal an independent coal exploration and mining company established by Chris Wallin in 1989. The company is based in Brisbane, Queensland, Australia.

QCoal and its subsidiaries own or co-own five mines within the Bowen Basin. The Sonoma mine commenced operations in 2007. Sonoma mine is part of the QCoal Northern Hub that also includes Drake mine, Sonoma North and Jax mine. The company also operates the Byerwen mine located 20 km west of Glenden.

Coal from QCoal’s mines is exported via Abbot Point.

In 2014 QCoal was named Miner of the Year by the Minister for Natural Resources and Mines.

In 2010 QCoal became a Principal Partner of the Royal Flying Doctor Service. In 2018 QCoal was awarded Queensland Community Foundation’s Corporate Philanthropist of the Year.
