= Gregory coal mine =

Mine in Queensland, Australia

Gregory Coal Mine
- Location: 60 km north east of Emerald, Queensland, Australia
- Products: Coking coal
- Opened: 1979
- Company: Sojitz Corporation

The Gregory Coal Mine is an open-cut coal mine located at Crinum, 60 km north east of Emerald in Central Queensland, Australia. The mine has coal reserves amounting to 159 million tonnes of coking coal, one of the largest coal reserves in Australia and the world. The Bowen Basin mine has an annual production capacity of 5 million tonnes of coal. Operations at the Gregory mine started in 1979. Coal from the mine is exported to the Port of Gladstone via the Blackwater railway system.

== History ==
The underground mine at the site is known as Crinum. Together both mines are referred to as the Gregory Crinum complex. Operations at the Crinum mine began in 1997 and it employs about 200 people.

Longwall mining at Crinum finished in 2007. Crinum received the Queensland Mining Industry Health and Safety Innovations Award in 2009 for a safety guard which prevents falls onto a coveyor belt.

Severe flooding affected operations at the mine in 2008. The 2010–11 Queensland floods resulted in a force majeure declaration for numerous Queensland mines including the Gregory Crinum complex.

In September 2012, it was announced that open-cut production at the mine was to cease on 10 October 2012. Due to falling coal prices the mine had become uneconomic. The Crinum underground mine was not closed and the coal handling preparation plant at Gregory would continue to be used. In mid 2013, the Crinum mine contained 8.3 million tonnes of coal and was forecast to continue extraction for another four years.

On 27 March 2019, BMA completed the sale of the mine to Sojitz Blue, an Australian arm of the Japanese corporation Sojitz, for A$100 million. In addition to the sale of the mine to Sojitz, BMA is providing appropriate funding for rehabilitation of the site, with all rehabilitation liabilities transferred to Sojitz.

Sojitz Blue contracted with Mackay company Mastermyne Pty Ltd to run the mine in May 2021.

In September 2021, a mine worker was killed and another seriously injured at the mine.

In October 2022, the Mining & Energy Union condemned an application by Sojitz Blue to import foreign labour. The Union said that Sojitz Blue was offering current workers substandard work contracts and was also blocking career progression and preventing upskilling.

== See also ==
- List of mines in Australia
