= Norwich Park coal mine =

Former mine in Queensland, Australia

Norwich Park Coal Mine
- Location within Queensland
- Location: Dysart, Queensland, Australia; 22°46′S 148°29′E
- Products: Coking coal
- Opened: 1979
- Closed: 2012
- Company: BHP Mitsubishi Alliance

The Norwich Park Coal Mine was an open cut coal mine located 25 kilometres (16 miles) south-east of Dysart, in Central Queensland, Australia. In 2012, the mine closed for economic reasons not because it was exhausted.

In 2003, the mine had coal reserves amounting to 823 million tonnes of coking coal. The mine had an annual production capacity of 4 million tonnes of coal.

Norwich Park is one of seven mines in the Bowen Basin owned by the BHP Mitsubishi Alliance (BMA). The closure of the mine was announced in April 2012 following losses from lower coal prices, higher costs and weaker output due to flooding. The mine closed on 11 May 2012, with BMA claiming that 90% of the 490 strong workforce who wished to continue working would be relocated to other mines in the region.

On July 1 2020, the Norwich Park mining lease was absorbed in its entirety into that of the adjacent BMA Saraji Mine, and officially ceased to exist.

== See also ==
- Coal mining in Australia
