= Peak Downs Mine =

Mine in Queensland, Australia

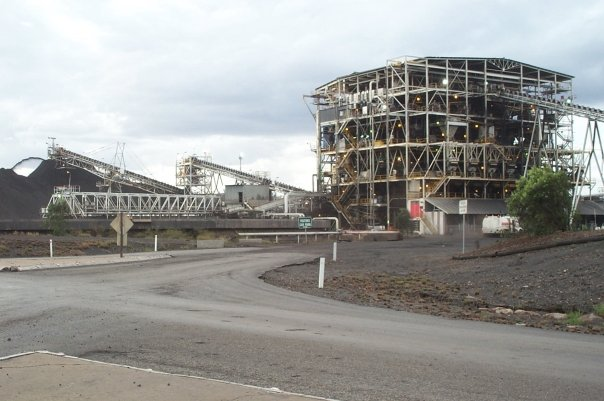
- Coal Handling and Preparation Plant

- Location in Australia
- Location: Moranbah, Queensland, Australia; 22°15′16″S 148°10′50″E
- Products: Coal
- Production: 37,000,000 Tonnes / Year
- Opened: April 1972
- Company: BHP Mitsubishi Alliance

Peak Downs Mine is a large open cut coking coal mine in Queensland located 31 km SSE of Moranbah. Peak Downs is one of seven mines in Bowen Basin owned by BHP Mitsubishi Alliance, Australia's largest coal miner and exporter. Production at Peak Downs started in 1972. By 2022 it was producing 37 million tonnes of coal per year.

The Caval Ridge Coal Mine, which will be located adjacent to Peak Downs, will begin construction in 2011 and export by 2014. It is expected to process 2.5 million tons of coal each year from Peak Downs.

The National Pollution Inventory revealed this mine was the biggest generator of airborne pollution in the country for the 2015–16 financial year.

Mining services are provided under contract by Thiess.

== See also ==
- Coal in Australia
- List of coal mines in Queensland
