= Foxleigh coal mine =

Mine in Qiueensland, Australia

Coordinates: 22°57′15″S 148°46′06″E

Foxleigh Coal Mine
- Interactive map of Foxleigh Coal Mine
- Location: Mackenzie River, Queensland, Australia
- Products: Coking coal
- Company: Middlemount South, POSCO, Nippon Steel

The Foxleigh Coal Mine is a coal mine in Mackenzie River, Queensland, Australia. It is within the Bowen Basin coal reserves of Central Queensland. The mine has coal reserves amounting to 102 million tonnes of coking coal, one of the largest coal reserves in Asia and the world. The mine has an annual production capacity of 3 million tonnes of coal.

Coal extracted from the mine has a very low ash content which is rare in Australia and valued by steelmakers.

The mine is owned by Middlemount South, POSCO and Nippon Steel. Exports leave the country via the Dalrymple Bay Coal Terminal at Hay Point.

== History ==
In December 1999, Thiess commenced operations at the mine.

A worker at the mine was killed on 18 December 2010, when a truck tyre exploded.

Anglo American acquired a 70% stake in Foxleigh in 2007. Nippon Steel bought a 10% stake in the mine from Itochu in 2010.

In 2016, Anglo American sold its 70% share of the Foxleigh coal mine to Middlemount South, a subsidiary of Taurus Funds Management.
