= BHP Mitsubishi Alliance =

Australian coal mining company

- Industry: Mining
- Founded: 2001
- Headquarters: Queen Street, Brisbane, Australia
- Area served: Bowen Basin Coalfields
- Owner: BHP (50%); Mitsubishi (50%)

The BHP Mitsubishi Alliance (BMA) is an Australian coal mining company operating in Central Queensland. The largest coal producer in Australia, it is a joint venture with BHP and Mitsubishi Development each owning 50%. It was established in 2001.

The BMA alliance operates five mines in the Bowen Basin:

- Broadmeadow
- Caval Ridge
- Goonyella Riverside
- Peak Downs
- Saraji

BMA also operates Moranbah Airport and part of the Hay Point Coal Terminal. It operated the Gregory coal mine until March 2019, when it was sold to Japan's Sojitz Corporation. BMA owned the Blackwater and Daunia coal mines until it was sold to Whitehaven Coal in April 2024.
