= List of mines in Australia by status =

As of November 2023, there were 379 operating mines in Australia.

Operational Status of Australian Mines and Mineral Deposits
Status	Count	Comments
Mineral Deposit	2068	
Under Development	38	A mineral deposit that is currently under development
Care And Maintenance	95	
Historic Mine	1234	
Operating Mine	379	A mine that is currently operating and/or production
Feasibility	29	A mineral deposit where feasibility study is currently being undertaken
Closed	69	

== See also ==
- Mining in Australia
- Australian mining law
