= List of collieries in Newcastle (Australia) =

This is a list of collieries near Newcastle New South Wales, Australia, organised by local government areas.

The NSW Minerals Council also has an online map of mines in NSW, which can be filtered to show coal mines, including those no longer operational, as well as new mine proposals.

== Newcastle ==
- A.A. Co. 'A' Pit, between Brown & McCormack Streets, Newcastle (1831-before 1855) - Australian Agricultural Company
- A.A. Co. 'B' Pit, at junction of Swan & Brook Streets, Cooks Hill (1837-before 1855) - Australian Agricultural Company.
- A.A. Co. 'C' Pit, below Obelisk Hill, Cooks Hill (1842-before 1855)- Australian Agricultural Company.
- A.A. Co. 'D' Pit, Cameron's Hill, Steel Street, Hamilton (1848- from 1878 a ventilation shaft only for the Hamilton pits) - Australian Agricultural Company.
- A.A. Co. 'E' Pit, Everton Street, Hamilton (1854-1863) - Australian Agricultural Company.
- A.A. Co. 'F' Pit, opposite end of Parry Street, Cooks Hill (1855-1864 when connected to Hamilton Borehole No.2. This then became a ventilation shaft until final closure in 1901) - Australian Agricultural Company.
- A.A. Co. 'H' Colliery (top of Beaumont Street, Hamilton, below Glebe Hill) (1873-1889 after massive cave-in) - Australian Agricultural Company.
- A.A. Co. Sea Pit (or New Winning) Colliery, Bull Street, Cooks Hill (1888- Friday 20 Oct 1916 due to exhausted reserves) Mined the Borehole seam with a shaft 250 feet in depth plus a tunnel or drift facing Darby Street. - Australian Agricultural Company. Colliery Manager in 1911 was Mr Richard Thomas.
- Back Creek (or Brown's) Colliery, Minmi, (1876-1924, 1930-1934). - J & A Brown.
- Blackhill Borehole Colliery, Glendale - Blackhill Mining Company.
- Borehill Colliery, Blackbutt Reserve, Newcastle, Working full time in 1952 - Mount Sugarloaf Collieries Pty. Ltd. Closed March 1979.
- Borehole No.1 Pit, Hamilton (1857-1901?) - Australian Agricultural Company
- Borehole No.2 Pit, Hamilton (1861-1901) - Australian Agricultural Company
- Boston Colliery (former Wallsend 'C' Pit), half a mile out of Wallsend. Borehole seam. Operational in 1943 and 1966. - Neal Bros (Wallsend) Pty. Ltd.
- Burwood 'A' Colliery, Glenrock Lagoon (founded 1877 as Redhead Colliery) - Burwood Coal Mining Company Ltd. Mining here ceased in 1893 and Burwood No.3 instead became the access point. Shaft walled on surface and retained for ventilation purposes.
- Co-operative Colliery, Wallsend (1862-1926 following endless disputes) - Co-operative Coal Company, from 1869 William Laidley & Co. Employed 90 men in 1894. From 1891 till closure Mr James Barr was the manager.
- Crofton Colliery, Kotara (1942-1957) Working full-time in 1948 and 1953. 19 miners dismissed at end of 1954.
- Donaldson's Tunnel, Happy Valley, Merewether (1844 - ) William Donaldson, proprietor.
- Duckenfield Colliery, Minmi (1873-1916,1930-1932) - J & A Brown.
- Duckenfield Colliery No.2 Colliery (renamed Stockrington Colliery 1935), Stockrington (1912-1956) J & A Brown
- Duckenfield Colliery No.3 Colliery, tunnel alongside the Richmond Vale railway line, Stockrington (1931-1955) - JABAS
- East Lambton Colliery, New Lambton (1888-1894) - East Lambton Coal Company
- East Waratah Colliery, Lambton (1882-1889) - Waratah Coal Company, later Mr T. G. Griffiths.
- Ferndale Colliery, Tighes Hill. (1877-1894)
- Fern Valley Colliery, near Adamstown on the New Lambton Company's estate, opened in 1889 by Messrs. Henry Evans (1852-1927) & Charles Turner. In Sept 1889 the coal was carried by a skip line from the pit to the Adamstown-Charlestown roadside platform where it was loaded onto carts. Meanwhile a new trainline link was being built to the New Lambton Colliery line. Working in Oct 1892 when the colliery manager was W.D. Bedlington However, despite being described in 1892, along with New Lambton Colliery, as "the staple industries of the borough" (Adamstown) by Oct 1900 Fern Valley Colliery was "abandoned" and the premises being sought by the local council as a sanitary depot.
- Glebe End Tunnel, (or just Glebe Tunnel) "adjacent to Glebe A Pit" - so possibly the former Nott's Tunnel, Merewether. Newcastle Coal Mining Company. Working full time in 1914; and in 1953 closed 21 Aug 1954 due to collapse in market.
- Glebe Hill Tunnel (sometimes called Glebe Main), Merewether (1913-1954) - The Newcastle Coal Mining Company Limited (lessee in 1919 was Jonathan Dixon) Working full time in 1953. Still operating Feb 1954; closed week ending 14 Aug 1954 due to collapse in market.
- Glebe Valley Colliery, operational in 1930 employing 20 men & 4 horses; no traces of gas; excellent ventillation. Difficult to determine which pit this is but may be Glebe End Tunnel.
- Glenbrook Tunnel (originally Fernleigh Pit 1922-1932), Adamstown Heights - Mr A Sketchley. Still working in 1950.
- Glenrock Colliery, Burwood Beach, Merewether (1884-1885, 1905- March 1944) - Messrs. Foreshaw, and Thomas Howley (1855-1942), who extracted 50,500,000 tons of coal until closure.
- Hamilton Borehole No.2 Colliery, cnr.Beaumont & Beckett Streets (1861 - 1901) - Australian Agricultural Co.
- Happy Valley Colliery (c1850) Merewether Estate (from 1920-c1955) Messrs. William & Malcolm Marheine In 1940 this colliery supplied the coal for Newcastle Abattoir. The colliery offices in 1951 were located in the T&G Building, Hunter Street.
- Hartley Vale Colliery, Adamstown (1864-1870) -J & A Brown.
- Hetton Colliery, Carrington (1885-1916) - Hetton Coal Company
- Hillside Tunnel, top of Merewether Street, Merewether Operational in 1919 when proprietors were Messrs. Bezant & Findlay; in 1936 - Hillside Colliery Company. - closed by 1940.
- Hillside Extended Colliery - two tunnels where Myamblah Crescent Reserve is today, Glebe, Merewether - Leigh Brothers in 1930. Working full time in 1953 Closed 21 Aug 1954 due to collapse in market.(Used Newcastle Coal Mining Cos. 'A' pit railway which closed at the end of that year as a result of the pit closures)
- Jesmond Colliery, off Corindi St., Jesmond (1910-1930) - Newcastle-Wallsend Coal Company 50 employees at closure, due to the Depression. Pit maintained for resumption. Noted as idle May 1931.
- Lambton Colliery (later Old Lambton Colliery), Lambton (1862-1936) - Scottish Australian Mining Company. A report in May 1921 stated there was no indication that reserves were anywhere near worked out and that the colliery had many years of working ahead. Site and railway continued in use after the pit closed, with coal-loading facilities for other collieries used until circa 1960.
- Maryville Colliery, Maryville (1884-1888) - The Maryville Colliery Company Limited.
- McCoshton Colliery, Wallsend, operational in 1967 - Thompson Borehole Collieries Pty. Ltd.
- Minmi Colliery 'A' Pit, Minmi (1853-1871) - John Eales - later J & A Brown
- Minmi Colliery 'B' Pit, Minmi (1853-1871) - John Eales - later J & A Brown
- Minmi Colliery 'C' Pit, Minmi (1861-1871) - J & A Brown
- Minmi Open Cut, Minmi (1949-1954) - J & A Brown and Abermain & Seaham Collieries Ltd. Working full time in 1952
- New Lambton Colliery (originally Lambton C Colliery), Adamstown - J & A Brown (1888 - Aug 1930) 150 employees.
- New Tunnel Colliery (later known as Elermore Vale Colliery), off Victory St., Jesmond (1874-1915 - working full time in 1952-3) - Newcastle-Wallsend Coal Company.
- Newcastle Coal Mining Co's Colliery 'A' Pit, Glebe, Merewether (1876-1921 - Main shaft). All surface equipment & screens etc continued to be used by the company's adjacent tunnels until a vast bush fire consumed them in Feb 1940. The offices were also burnt out destroying colliery records going back to 1876. The colliery manager in 1889 was Alexander Ross and during The Great War was Mr G. F. Thomas.
- Newcastle Coal Mining Co Colliery 'B' Pit, Caldwell St., Merewether, (1882 - 1909 following underground connexions with 'A' pit) - The Newcastle Coal Mining Company Limited. In 1914 it was mentioned as the "re-opened B Pit" when it was serving as a downcast shaft with the upcast shaft being at 'A' pit. 'B' Pit ventilation intake in July 1917 was 28,380 per cubic feet per minute.
- Redhead (later Burwood) Colliery, Glenrock Lagoon (1861-?) - Newcastle Coal & Copper Company
- Shortland Colliery, Adamstown (Victoria seam)(before 1900 - by end of 1933) - Mr J. Ruttley, proprietor (d. July 1935.)
- Stockton Colliery, Stockton (1875-1908) - Stockton Coal Company Limited.
- Stockrington No.2 Colliery (originally Freeman's Tunnel, renamed 1943), above Stockrington (1952- 1988) - J & A Brown and Abermain & Seaham Collieries Ltd. This used the Richmond Vale railway line.
- Taylor's Borehole No.1 Colliery, Wallsend - Taylor's Borehole Collieries Pty Ltd, ("Not working" in 1966).
- Victoria Tunnel Colliery, Glebe, Merewether - Newcastle Coal Mining Company (adjacent to 'A' pit and using their loading equipment & railway) - Mentioned in Company reports as still producing "regularly & profitably" in 1928. Employed 56 miners in 1929. Reported as a non-union colliery in 1936. Probably closed in Feb 1940 after vast bush fires destroyed all the surface loaders and other top-side equipment. Definitely closed before 1949.
- Wallsend Borehole Colliery, Wallsend, (1876 - working 1930 and 1966) - William Laidley & Company, later RW Miller.
- Wallsend Colliery 'A' Pit (1859-1867, 1890- ), Wallsend, Newcastle-Wallsend Coal Company
- Wallsend Colliery 'B' Pit (1861- March 1935), Wallsend, Newcastle-Wallsend Coal Company.
- Wallsend Colliery 'C' Pit (1867- March 1935), Wallsend, Newcastle-Wallsend Coal Company. This colliery was later re-opened as Boston Colliery.

'A', 'B' and 'C' pits were eventually linked underground becoming simply Wallsend Colliery. In 1916 the colliery manager, Sydney Croudace, retired. It employed 503 miners in 1929 but closed in 1935.

- Waratah Colliery, Waratah (1862-1880) - Waratah Coal Company
- Waratah Colliery (colloquially known as Raspberry Gully Pit, Charles Pit & the Gully Pit), Charlestown, New South Wales (1873-1961) - Waratah Coal Company; from c1892 Caledonian Collieries Ltd. Mothballed and given as idle ("not working") in July 1966. Clear intent to re-open but this did not happen.
- Waratah Tunnel (later Wattle Glen Colliery), Charlestown (1875-?,1917-1919) - Waratah Coal Company.
- West Burwood Colliery, Glebe, Merewether (two tunnels SW of N.C.M.Co's 'A' Pit), Prop. Mr Thomson (1888-1894) employing 50 miners in 1890. Then Messrs J.M. Brooke & J.C. Berger (1930-1937) (on a sub-lease from the Newcastle Coal Mining Company).
- Wickham & Bullock Island Colliery, Carrington (1883-1905) - Wickham & Bullock Island Coal Company

== Lake Macquarie District ==
- Ajax Colliery, Cardiff. Was idle due to a dispute in early Sept 1954.
- Austral Main Colliery, Cardiff. Operational in 1950.
- Awaba State Coal Mine (1947 - 2012) - State Mines Control Authority.
- Belltop Colliery (Fassifern Seam) Hill Street, Belmont. Operational before 1950, working full time in 1952 still operating in 1967 - closed by 1969. - James Bennett, proprietor.
- Belmont Colliery - between Croudace Bay Road & Black Jack's Point, operational in 1925-9 - working full-time in 1948 still operational in 1950 when it still used the railway loader at Belmont Station sidings which it built in 1926. Employed 143 men in 1952. Closed by 1966.
- Belmont North Colliery, off Croudace Bay Road, Belmont. Operational in 1945, 1950 & 1953 Closed by 1966.
- Blackhill Borehole No.3 Colliery, Glendale, operational in 1966. - Blackhill Mining Co.
- Burwood No.3 Colliery (originally Burwood B shaft), Whitebridge (1889-1982) - South Burwood Coal Company Limited - 1893 Scottish Australian Mining Company - 1932 BHP
- Cardiff - later Cardiff Borehole Colliery, fully operational 1894 - still working 1929. Had its own rail link to the government lines.
- Cardiff Tickhole Colliery 1925. In 1950 Blackbutt No.1 Colliery.
- Chain Valley Colliery, Doyalson, new in 1960s - J & A Brown & Abermain Seaham Collieries Ltd later Lake Coal Pty.Ltd. Chain Valley Mine is entirely surrounded by Mannering, Myuna and Wallarah Collieries as well as by the historic Newvale and Moonee Collieries.
- Cooranbong Colliery 1980 (Reserves exhausted 2004 - now part of Mandalong Colliery)
- Ebenezer Colliery 1840 (renamed South Hetton Colliery in 1906), Coal Point.
- Dudley Colliery (originally South Burwood Colliery, renamed Dudley Colliery in 1891), Dudley (1881- June 1930, Jan 1932-1939) South Burwood Coal Company - 1896 The Dudley Coal Company Limited
- Evelen Colliery, off First Street, Cardiff South, Opened 1920, still working 1930 - Messrs. Waddell, Skinner, Smith & McKay. Manager: Mr.Cherry.
- Fern Colliery, Dudley, opened and operated by John Roger Stevenson (1888-1950). Worked the Wave Hill seam and, from July 1949, the Victoria seam. Employed seven men at closure at the end of 1954 due to the coal market slump.
- Hartley Hill Colliery, south of Cardiff. 1880s to 1926.
- John Darling Colliery (1926-1987) Belmont North - BHP.
- Jubilee Colliery, Cardiff. Operational in 1950.
- Lake Macquarie Coal Co Colliery 1875
- Lambton B Colliery (originally Ryhope Colliery, renamed Durham Colliery 1888, renamed Lambton No. 2 Colliery 1898, renamed Lambton B Colliery 1898 renamed Lambton Colliery 1932), Redhead (1887-1991 ) - Scottish Australian Mining Company to 1932 then BHP.
- Lochend Colliery 1843, Speers Point.
- Lymington Colliery "on a hill on the western side of Cardiff" was sunk in 1885 by the Lymington-Wallsend Coal Co., subsequently the Lymington Coal Co. Managing-Director in 1918 was Mr. C.E.D.Rogers. Extensive improvements were made in 1912 when the colliery manager was Mr. C.S.F. Hood, a new fan installed in 1918 and a new tunnel sunk in 1921. An inspector's report in 1932 found the mine in "best order" with satisfactory ventilation for 44 men and 5 horses. In October 1933 the colliery employed 64 people, but was closed permanently some time in 1934. Calls were made during WWII for it to be re-opened but this did not occur.
- Mandalong Colliery, near Morisset, New in 2005 - Centennial Coal.
- Mount Sugarloaf Colliery, West Wallsend (1949-1978). - Mt.Sugarloaf Collieries Pty. Ltd.
- Munmorah State Coal Mine, Doyalson, (1962-2005) - State Mines Control Authority.
- Murray Brothers Coal Mine 1863
- Myall Extended Colliery, Pendlebury Road, Cardiff. Opened June 1918. Newcastle-Myall Coal Company. Used Bramble & Co., lorries to trucked its coal originally to a loader at Cardiff Railway Station, thereafter to Old Lambton Colliery coal loader. Operational in 1950. Closed in July 1954 due to collapse in market. Then employed 38 men.
- Myuna Colliery 1981
- Newstan Colliery, originally Northumberland Colliery c1890. From 1950 renamed after new lease awarded to Newstan Colliery Pty. Ltd. Fassifern. Closed 2019.
- Newvale No.1 Colliery (1962-1994) - Newstan Colliery Pty. Ltd.
- Newvale No.2 Colliery 1962 (Renamed Endeavour Colliery (before 1966-1999) - Newstan Colliery Pty. Ltd.
- New Wallsend Company Colliery 1873
- Normaine Colliery, Swansea. Working part-time in 1952 Closed July 1954 due to collapse in market.
- North Wallarah Colliery, Swansea. In Feb 1941 a new coal-loader was constructed at the Belmont railway sidings for this pit.
- Northern Colliery, Rhondda (1900) - William Laidley and Co., later RW Miller. Working full time in 1952 Still operational in 1967.
- Northern No.2 Colliery, Belmont. Working full-time in 1952 and in 1966. - Northern (Rhondda) Collieries Pty. Ltd., a subsidiary of RW Miller
- Northern Extended Colliery, Teralba (1890) (originally Gartlee Mine, renamed in 1902) - A Sneddon Pty. Ltd. Working full time in 1952 Idle - "Not working" - in July 1966.
- Northumberland Colliery, Fassifern - Northumberland Coal Company (Croft family). Founded c1890. Borehole Seam. Manager in 1909 was Mr James Rice. Employed 37 miners in 1929. In 1950 leased to Electricity Commission who renamed it Newstan Colliery (after Stanley Croft).
- Oldstan Colliery 1919, south of Fassifern - Northumberland Coal Company (Croft family). Installed electrical equipment for the first time in June 1931. Mentions in press in 1932. Operating in 1944. Closure date unclear but by 1950.
- Pacific Colliery, Teralba - Great Northern Coal Co Colliery 1886 (renamed Northern Colliery in 1890; Pacific Co-operative Colliery in 1893; and Pacific in 1914) - Pacific Colliery Pty. Ltd. Still working 1966.
- Redhead Colliery (originally Burwood Extended, renamed Ocean Colliery in 1903, reverted to Burwood Extended 1904 and Redhead Colliery in 1920) (1888-1927) - New Redhead Coal Company (which owned the Belmont railway line).
- Rising Sun Colliery, Cardiff. Operational in 1950.
- Rosebank Colliery, Cardiff. Operational in 1947 & 1950.
- Seaham No.1 Colliery, Seahampton nr. West Wallsend (1890 - July 1932 during Depression) - Monkwearmouth Coal Company, then Seaham Coal Company, then J & A Brown.
- Seaham No.2 Colliery (1905 - 1945), Fairley, nr. Barnsley - Seaham Coal Company - later J & A Brown. (Reserves exhausted)
- South Wallsend Colliery Cardiff, connected by South Wallsend rail siding to Great Northern Line from 1888.
- Speers Point Gully Mine 1916
- Stockton Borehole Colliery (originally Teralba Colliery 1901 - Teralba Co-operative Coal Company; renamed Borehole Colliery 1906 - Borehole Colliery Limited, the principal stockholder being the Stockton Coal Company who in 1908 renamed it Stockton Borehole, Teralba, from 1949 BHP.
- Swansea Colliery (1947- Working full time in 1952) Swansea Heads - Australian Consolidated Industries.
- Swansea Open Cut (south of Swansea)
- Westside Mine 1992
- Wallamaine Colliery Pty Ltd, south of Swansea. Closure announced in 1954 due to the slump, but still operational in 1966.
- Wallarah Colliery 1888 - 2002, Catherine Hill Bay - Wallarah Coal Company, from 1955 J & A Brown & Abermain Seaham Collieries Ltd.
- West Wallsend Colliery (1888 - Sept 1923) - West Wallsend Coal Company. First colliery manager: Thomas John Evans; from 1895 owned by Caledonian Collieries Limited. Closed during coal industry slump. (Huge reserves.) Caledonian Collieries reported in May 1931 that the colliery had not worked since 1924 but had been kept in readiness for resumption of operations in the event of trade reviving, but has now been abandoned.
- West Wallsend Colliery [2], midway between Killingworth & Barnsley (1969-2016) - operated by Oceanic Coal Australia Limited (OCAL) on behalf of Macquarie Coal Joint Venture. OCAL is the majority shareholder in the Macquarie Coal Joint Venture with 70% ownership. Other shareholders include Marubeni Coal Pty Ltd (17%), OCAL Macquarie Pty Ltd (10%) and JFE Minerals (Australia) Pty Ltd (3%). OCAL, which also owns OCAL Macquarie Pty Ltd, is wholly owned by Glencore Coal (Australia) Pty Limited.
- West Wallsend Extended Colliery (1892 - 2 August 1962), Killingworth, - Caledonian Collieries Ltd. Given as idle ("not working") in July 1966. As with other Caledonian Collieries there was an expectation of re-opening, which did not occur.
- Wyee Colliery 1962-2002 - State Mines Control Authority. Leases purchased 2002 by Centennial Coal and renamed Mannering Colliery (2005-2012). On 17 Oct 2013 LakeCoal Pty Ltd became the operator and recommenced operations.
- Young Wallsend Coal Co Colliery (1887), at Edgeworth. It was said to be still operating in Jan 1934.
