= Coal in Australia =

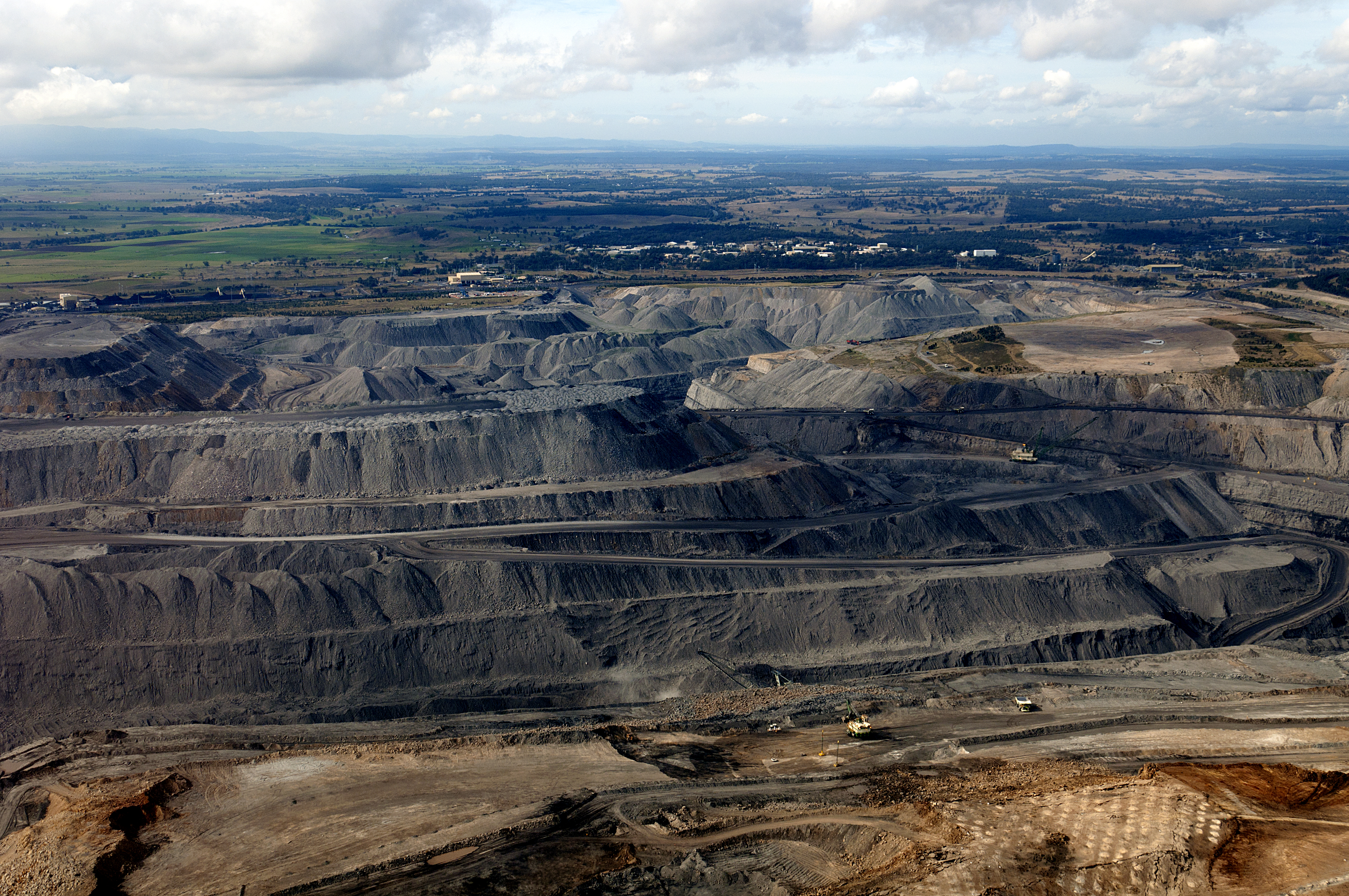
Open cut coal mine in the Hunter valley

Coal is mined in nearly every state of Australia. The largest black coal resources occur in Queensland and New South Wales. About 70% of coal mined in Australia is exported, mostly to eastern Asia, and of the balance most is used in electricity generation. In 2019-20 Australia exported 390 Mt of coal (177 Mt metallurgical coal and 213 Mt thermal coal) and was the world's largest exporter of metallurgical coal and second largest exporter of thermal coal. Despite only employing 50,000 mining jobs nationally, coal provides a rich revenue stream for governments.

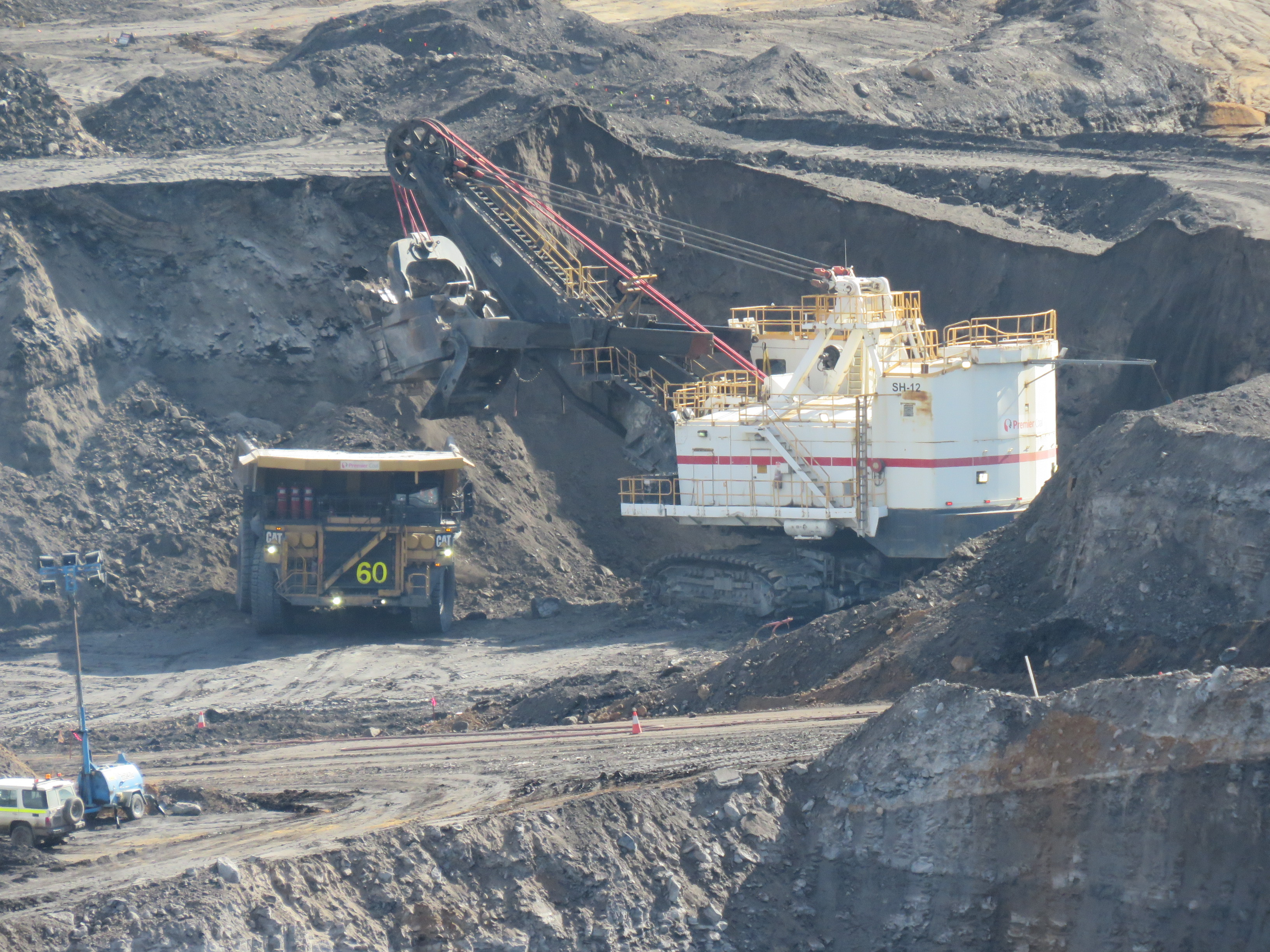
Premier coal mine in Western Australia, 2022

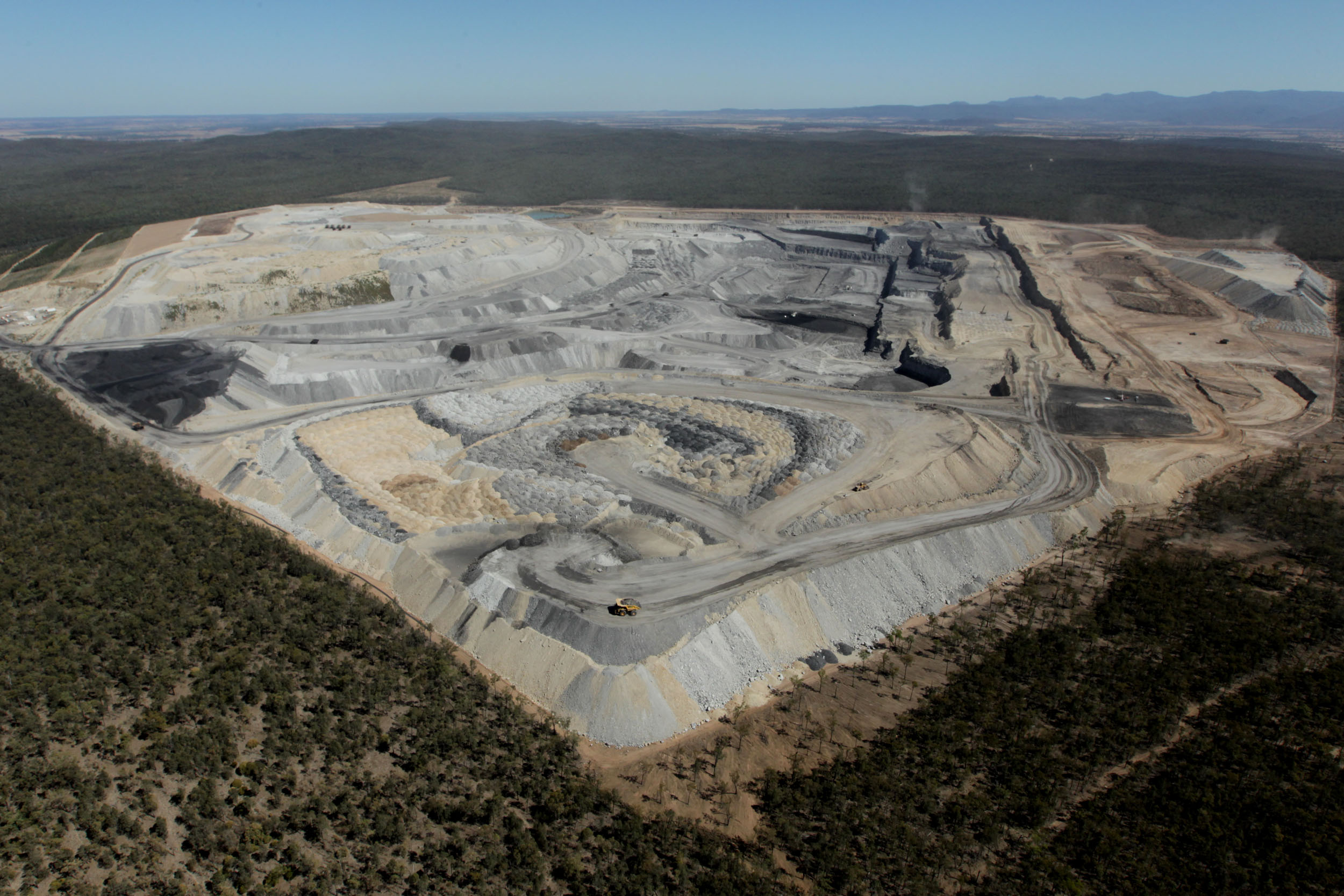
Maules Creek coal mine, 2014

Coal mining in Australia has been criticized, due to carbon dioxide emissions during combustion. This criticism is primarily directed at thermal coal, for its connection to coal-fired power stations as a major source of carbon dioxide emissions, and the link to climate change in Australia and worldwide. Coal was responsible for 30% (164 million tonnes) of Australia's greenhouse gas (GHG) emissions, not counting methane and export coal, in 2019. Coal as a fuel was responsible for 41% (160 million tonnes) of carbon dioxide emissions in Australia in 2020. Problems of environmental injustices have risen historically, and to this day. Coal mines in Australia have been built on or near indigenous lands and more vulnerable communities. The Aboriginal peoples and Torres Strait Islander peoples, specifically, have been impacted the most by the pollution from the mines. Protests from these people have been prominent because of how strong their relations to their land are. Similarly, more vulnerable communities living in low-income neighborhoods have been disproportionately affected compared to those of higher class who live far from these mines. This pollution is also extremely harmful to nonhuman species, and can take away from their role in ecosystems.

The Carbon Pollution Reduction Scheme, which followed the draft report in the Garnaut Climate Change Review, placed a price on carbon emissions through a reducing cap and trade emissions trading scheme and incentivised against carbon pollution temporarily, before it was revoked in 2014.

In 2021, coal accounted for 64% of energy production and 32% of the Total Energy Supply (TES), with 93% of its consumption by the heat and electricity generation sector and the remaining 7% by the industrial sector. Coal remains a significant source of electricity generation in Australia, however its share has declined in recent years as renewable energy and battery storage capacity have expanded.

== History ==
Australian Energy resources and major export ports as of 2008

Full-time employment in coal mining since 1984 (thousands of people)

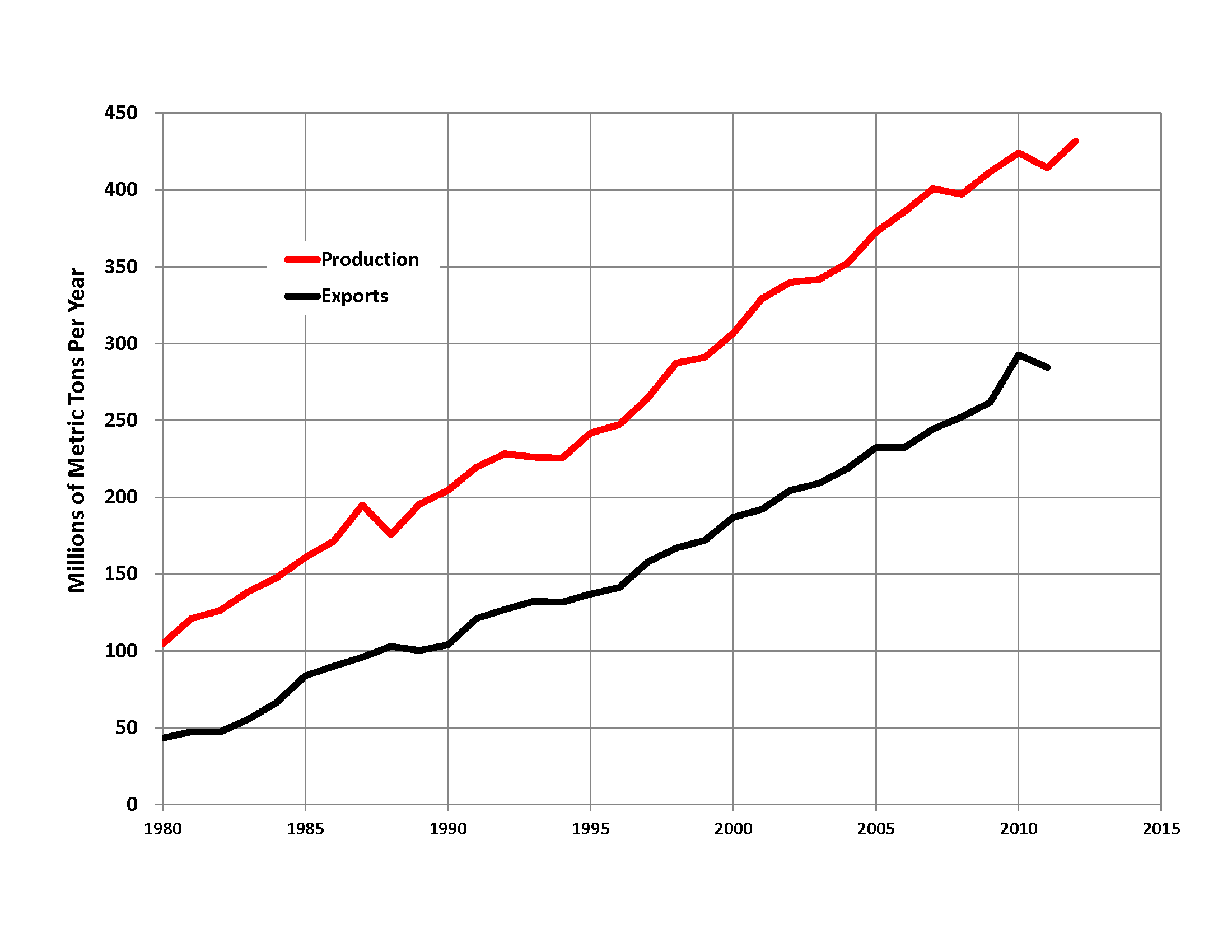
Australian coal production (red) and exports (black), 1980–2012

Australian coal was first discovered in New South Wales by shipwreck survivors in August 1797, at Coalcliff, north of Wollongong. George Bass discovered coal soon afterwards in the cliffs at Newcastle off Point Solander. Coal exports first left Newcastle in 1799, with it being mined by convicts. Shipments left for India, marking Australia's first commodity export. Mining in the area was initially small scale and used in domestic heating.

In Queensland, coal mining began near Ipswich in 1825. The following year coal was discovered at Cape Paterson in Victoria. In the 1850s the deposits were mined, but it was not enough to sustain Victorian communities. Coal was discovered in Tasmania at Plunkett Point in 1833. In Western Australia, the first coal deposits were discovered in 1846 at Irwin River in what is known as the Coalseam Conservation Park. There have been long term impacts due to coal mining at the park. For example, long lasting impacts to are typically permanent, and the land may never return to its former state.

By 1901 Australia was exporting several million tonnes annually. By the 1900s coal had become integral to the economy as it was used in locomotives on railways and in steam mills cutting logs, and grinding wheat. In New South Wales development was particularly influenced by coal during the 20th century. During the 1940s Australian coal mines experienced significant strikes. Strikes were largely due to the fact that communities living close to these mines were put at risk. Evidence of these dangers are shown by, Barbara Heaton, a retired public servant and graduate of the University of Newcastle, “A NSW miner who worked for 40 years between 1902 and 1976 had a one-in-24 chance of accidental death and a one-in-five chance of serious, debilitating injury.” The 1949 Australian coal strike lasted for seven weeks. The Joint Coal Board was formed to aid in the resolution of workers' disputes. Before WWII underground mines dominated. After WWII, Australia began exporting coking coal to Japan to aid in their production of steel. Exports to South Korea and Taiwan soon followed. Australia became the number one coal exporter in 1984. By 1986 Australia was supplying around half of all its exports to Japan. As the Bowen Basin Coalfields were developed, open-cut mines became more common. From the 1980s onwards the ratio of thermal coal exported to Asia increased significantly. High-grade coking coal extracted from the Illawarra region has supported a steel and steel products market with exports leaving via Port Kembla harbour. An anti-coal movement is a recent historical development.

== Production and reserves ==
Australian coal is either high-quality bituminous coal (black coal) or lower-quality lignite (brown coal). Bituminous coal is mined in Queensland and New South Wales. It is used for both domestic power generation and is exported. Mining is underground or open-cut. The coal is transported by rail to power stations or export shipping terminals.

Lignite is mined in Victoria and South Australia, and is of lower quality due to a lower thermal value largely caused by a high water content. Ash content varies significantly but some Australian lignites have relatively low ash content. In 2013 coal from three open cut lignite coal mines in Victoria was used for power generation.

It was the fourth-highest producer with 6.9% of global production (503 Mt out of 7,269 Mt total). 77% of production was exported (389 Mt out of 503 Mt total). At the end of 2019, Australia earned $63.9 billion from black coal. The value of Australian coal exports reached $112 billion in the 2021-22 financial year. This was the second time a commodity had reached $100 billion in exports for Australia, after iron ore. In 2021, Australia ranked second among International Energy Agency (IEA) member countries for the highest utilization of coal in both energy generation and electricity production.

== Exports ==
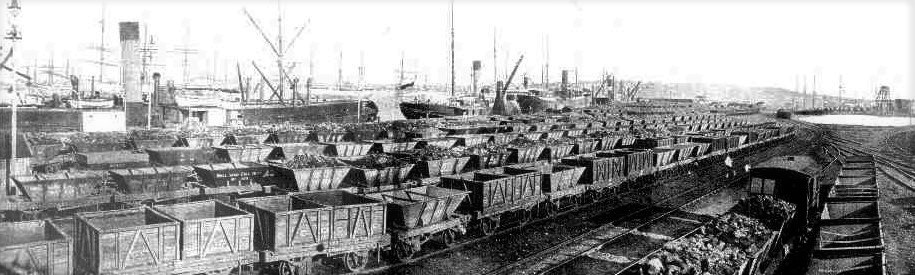
Coal loading facilities at Newcastle, 1901

Australian coal and coke quarterly exports ($Millions) between 1960-2020.

Australia is a significant coking coal supplier to major steel-producing economies.

In 2016, Australia was the biggest net exporter of coal, with 32% of global exports (389 Mt out of 1,213 Mt total). Australia exports the largest share of coal of any nation, at 54% of the total. In 2020, exports of coal accounted for 1% of national revenue, with a total value of A$55 billion. Australia is the world's leading exporter of coking coal. In 2021-2022, about 55% of its coal exports were thermal coal, with the remainder being metallurgical coal. The primary destinations for its coal exports are Asian countries, notably Japan, Korea, India, and Taiwan. Following import restrictions by the Chinese government in 2021, coal exports to China ceased, even though China had previously received 69% of Australia's exports in 2020. Currently, the main importers of Australia's metallurgical coal include India, Japan, the European Union, and Korea.

Major export markets for Australian coal (2018)
Country/area	Millions of tonnes			Rank	% of exports
Country/area	Coking	Steaming	Total	Rank	% of exports
Japan	35.8	81.0	116.8	1	30.0
China	39.6	49.8	89.4	2	23.1
India	45.3	4.8	50.1	3	13.0
Other	30.3	19.5	49.8	4	12.9
Korea (ROK)	17.8	30.1	47.9	5	12.4
Taiwan	10.0	22.5	32.5	6	8.4
Total	178.8	207.7	386.5		

=== Major coal export ports ===
The Port of Newcastle, New South Wales, is the world's largest and most efficient coal handling operation through its two terminals: Carrington and Kooragang. Australia has nine major coal-export ports, including:

Major Australian coal export ports
Port	State	Millions of tonnes	
Port	State	2009	2008
Newcastle	NSW	92.8	91.4
Hay Point	QLD	82.4	80.4
Gladstone	QLD	56.2	54.1
Abbot Point	QLD	14.4	12.5
Port Kembla	NSW	13.7	13.3
Brisbane	QLD	6.3	5.5
Total		265.8	257.2

== Table of Coal Mines in Australia ==
Coal Mines in Australia
Name	Alternate Names	State	Coordinates	Status	Commodities	Geological Province	Geological Age
Hume		New South Wales	34.5497°S 150.2729°E	Feasibility	Coal - black	Sydney Basin	
White Mountain (Clyde Park)	Clyde Park	Queensland	20.45°S 145.15°E	Feasibility	Coal - black	Galilee Basin	
Cornwall	Blackwood No. 4	Tasmania	41.55°S 148.1333°E	Operating Mine	Coal - black	Tasmania Basin	
Byerwen		Queensland	21.35°S 147.81°E	Operating Mine	Coal - black	Bowen Basin	
Jax		Queensland	20.72°S 147.87°E	Operating Mine	Coal - black	Bowen Basin	
Dysart East		Queensland	22.55°S 148.41°E	Feasibility	Coal - black	Bowen Basin	
Orion Downs	Inderi, Meteor Downs South	Queensland	24.425°S 148.361°E	Operating Mine	Coal - black	Bowen Basin	
Drake		Queensland	20.708°S 147.816°E	Operating Mine	Coal - black	Bowen Basin	
Abel		New South Wales	32.8184°S 151.6211°E	Care And Maintenance	Coal - black	Sydney Basin	
Springsure Creek		Queensland	24.17°S 148.41°E	Feasibility	Coal - black	Bowen Basin	
Newstan Lochiel	Awaba East	New South Wales	33.0302°S 151.5636°E	Care And Maintenance	Coal - black	Sydney Basin	
Carmichael	Galilee (Linc Energy)	Queensland	22.018°S 146.322°E	Operating Mine	Coal - black	Galilee Basin	
Broadmeadow	includes Wallanbah	Queensland	21.8076°S 148.1524°E	Operating Mine	Coal - black	Bowen Basin	
Thagoona	part of Jeebropilly	Queensland	27.6355°S 152.6299°E	Historic Mine	Coal - black	Clarence-Moreton Basin	Mesozoic
Colton	Burrum, Maryborough	Queensland	25.452°S 152.702°E	Feasibility	Coal - black	Maryborough Basin	
Wallarah		New South Wales	33.1355°S 151.6122°E	Closed	Coal - black	Sydney Basin	
Canyon		New South Wales	33.5361°S 150.2764°E	Closed	Coal - black	Sydney Basin	
Wonthaggi		Victoria	38.609°S 145.589°E	Historic Mine	Coal - black	Gippsland Basin	
Spring Mountain		Queensland	27.6886°S 152.8632°E	Closed	Coal - black	Ipswich Basin	Mesozoic
Western No5		Western Australia	33.4553°S 116.2354°E	Historic Mine	Coal - black	Collie Basin	
Hazelwood		Victoria	38.2485°S 146.4013°E	Closed	Coal - brown	Gippsland Basin	
Eastern Creek	Newlands	Queensland	21.2077°S 148.0156°E	Historic Mine	Coal - black	Bowen Basin	
Bayswater No.2		New South Wales	32.3505°S 150.8914°E	Historic Mine	Coal - black	Sydney Basin	
Blue Mountains		New South Wales	33.4869°S 150.2°E	Historic Mine	Coal - black	Sydney Basin	
Oakleigh Colliery	New Oakleigh	Queensland	27.6134°S 152.5854°E	Historic Mine	Coal - black	Clarence-Moreton Basin	
Preston Extended		New South Wales	31.0897°S 150.1997°E	Historic Mine	Coal - black	Gunnedah Basin	
Harrow Creek		Queensland	22.2359°S 148.1852°E	Historic Mine	Coal - black	Bowen Basin	
Smithfield	part of Jeebropilly	Queensland	27.658°S 152.5977°E	Historic Mine	Coal - black	Clarence-Moreton Basin	Mesozoic
Ewington	Ewington 1, Ewington 2	Western Australia	33.3624°S 116.25°E	Operating Mine	Coal - black	Collie Basin	
Ravensworth East	Swamp Creek	New South Wales	32.3955°S 151.0717°E	Operating Mine	Coal - black	Sydney Basin	
Chicken Creek		Western Australia	33.4053°S 116.3229°E	Closed	Coal - black	Collie Basin	
Driffield		Victoria	38.2566°S 146.3368°E	Historic Mine	Coal - brown	Gippsland Basin	Proterozoic
Loy Yang Mine		Victoria	38.2347°S 146.564°E	Operating Mine	Coal - brown	Gippsland Basin	
Cooranbong		New South Wales	33.0768°S 151.51°E	Historic Mine	Coal - black	Sydney Basin	
Ravensworth Narama		New South Wales	32.4568°S 151.04°E	Closed	Coal - black	Sydney Basin	
Kandos No.3		New South Wales	32.8669°S 149.99°E	Historic Mine	Coal - black	Sydney Basin	
Ensham	Yongala	Queensland	23.4545°S 148.4975°E	Operating Mine	Coal - black	Bowen Basin	
Gunnedah		New South Wales	31.0168°S 150.18°E	Closed	Coal - black	Gunnedah Basin	
Cardiff Borehole		New South Wales	32.932°S 151.651°E	Closed	Coal - black	Sydney Basin	
South Blackwater	Humboldt, Kenmare, Kennedy, Laleham No1, Terang, Togara	Queensland	23.9469°S 148.75°E	Historic Mine	Coal - black	Bowen Basin	
Cumnock	Cumnock No1	New South Wales	32.403°S 150.9986°E	Care And Maintenance	Coal - black	Sydney Basin	
Ashton		New South Wales	32.4667°S 151.0667°E	Operating Mine	Coal - black	Sydney Basin	
Moolarben		New South Wales	32.29°S 149.785°E	Operating Mine	Coal - black	Sydney Basin	
Cook and Cook North	Leichardt Colliery	Queensland	23.7092°S 148.9147°E	Operating Mine	Coal - black	Bowen Basin	
Riverside	Goonyella-Riverside	Queensland	21.6518°S 147.9144°E	Closed	Coal - black	Bowen Basin	
Hillalong (MDL 324)		Queensland	21.3676°S 148.2838°E	Feasibility	Coal - black	Bowen Basin	
Oakdale		New South Wales	34.0378°S 150.4803°E	Historic Mine	Coal - black	Sydney Basin	
Bulga	Beltana, Saxonvale, South Bulga	New South Wales	32.6868°S 151.11°E	Operating Mine	Coal - black	Sydney Basin	
Leigh Creek	Copley Basin (Lobe A&E), North Field (Lobe C&D), Telford Basin (Lobe B)	South Australia	30.4804°S 138.4166°E	Historic Mine	Coal - black	Leigh Creek Basin	
Hazelwood Mine	Morwell, South East Field, West Field	Victoria	38.269°S 146.391°E	Historic Mine	Coal - brown	Gippsland Basin	Cenozoic
Duralie	Gloucester, Wards River	New South Wales	32.2914°S 151.9491°E	Closed	Coal - black	Gloucester Basin	
Springvale	Lamberts Gully	New South Wales	33.4006°S 150.1056°E	Operating Mine	Coal - black	Sydney Basin	
Lake Vermont	Vermont	Queensland	22.399°S 148.4385°E	Operating Mine	Coal - black	Bowen Basin	
Invincible		New South Wales	33.3269°S 150.03°E	Care And Maintenance	Coal - black	Sydney Basin	
Liddell	Liddell State	New South Wales	32.3916°S 150.9999°E	Operating Mine	Coal - black	Sydney Basin	
Callide	includes EPC188 & Boundary Hill	Queensland	24.3109°S 150.6222°E	Operating Mine	Coal - black	Callide Basin	
Goonyella Riverside	Broadmeadow, Cleanskin, Eureka, Goonyella-Riverside, Isaac, Redhill, Riverside	Queensland	21.7923°S 147.962°E	Operating Mine	Coal - black	Bowen Basin	
Coppabella	Johnson Pit	Queensland	21.8446°S 148.4272°E	Operating Mine	Coal - black	Bowen Basin	
Bluff		Queensland	23.519°S 149.0649°E	Operating Mine	Coal - black	Bowen Basin	
Wilpinjong		New South Wales	32.332°S 149.885°E	Operating Mine	Coal - black	Sydney Basin	
Moranbah North		Queensland	21.8713°S 147.9567°E	Operating Mine	Coal - black	Bowen Basin	
Coal Cliff		New South Wales	34.2294°S 150.9778°E	Historic Mine	Coal - black	Sydney Basin	
Mount Arthur	Bayswater No3, Hunter Valley, Mt Arthur North	New South Wales	32.337°S 150.8561°E	Operating Mine	Coal - black	Sydney Basin	
Muja		Western Australia	33.4205°S 116.3095°E	Closed	Coal - black	Collie Basin	
Cordeaux		New South Wales	34.3153°S 150.7617°E	Historic Mine	Coal - black	Sydney Basin	
New Oakleigh	Oakleigh Colliery, Rosewood	Queensland	27.6117°S 152.5748°E	Closed	Coal - black	Clarence-Moreton Basin	Mesozoic
Mangoola	Anvil Hill, Great Northern, Hunter Great Northern	New South Wales	32.2968°S 150.67°E	Operating Mine	Coal - black	Sydney Basin	
Maxwell (Drayton)	Saddlers Creek	New South Wales	32.3473°S 150.9113°E	Care And Maintenance	Coal - black	Sydney Basin	
Anglesea	Angahook, Jan Juc	Victoria	38.3918°S 144.17°E	Closed	Coal - brown	Otway Basin	Cenozoic
Wilkie Creek	Braemar, Macalister, Tarcoola	Queensland	27.0423°S 150.9608°E	Closed	Coal - black	Surat Basin	
Westside		New South Wales	32.9468°S 151.57°E	Historic Mine	Coal - black	Sydney Basin	
Baal Bone		New South Wales	33.2669°S 150.05°E	Closed	Coal - black	Sydney Basin	
Duncan	Blackwood Mt Nicholas	Tasmania	41.5552°S 148.1105°E	Historic Mine	Coal - black	Tasmania Basin	
Mount Pleasant (MACH Energy Pty Limited)		New South Wales	32.2368°S 150.84°E	Operating Mine	Coal - black	Sydney Basin	
Rocglen	Belmont	New South Wales	30.7619°S 150.2718°E	Care And Maintenance	Coal - black	Gunnedah Basin	
Daunia		Queensland	22.044°S 148.2885°E	Operating Mine	Coal - black	Bowen Basin	
Jeebropilly	7 Mile, Jeebropilly North, Jeebropilly West, Smithfield, Thagoona, West Moreton	Queensland	27.623°S 152.6594°E	Care And Maintenance	Coal - black	Clarence-Moreton Basin	Mesozoic
Mannering	Wyee, Wyee State	New South Wales	33.2078°S 151.5342°E	Care And Maintenance	Coal - black	Sydney Basin	
Collinsville	McNaughton, Wollombi	Queensland	20.5676°S 147.7686°E	Operating Mine	Coal - black	Bowen Basin	
Crinum		Queensland	23.2101°S 148.371°E	Care And Maintenance	Coal - black	Bowen Basin	
Berrima	Medway Colliery	New South Wales	34.4652°S 150.2657°E	Closed	Coal - black	Sydney Basin	
Stratford	Bowens Road North	New South Wales	32.1161°S 151.9747°E	Closed	Coal - black	Gloucester Basin	
Tasman	O'Donnell	New South Wales	32.8868°S 151.54°E	Care And Maintenance	Coal - black	Sydney Basin	
Mount Thorley		New South Wales	32.6374°S 151.1086°E	Operating Mine	Coal - black	Sydney Basin	
Curragh	includes Curragh West	Queensland	23.4662°S 148.8541°E	Operating Mine	Coal - black	Bowen Basin	
Warkworth	Warkworth No.1	New South Wales	32.607°S 151.0902°E	Operating Mine	Coal - black	Sydney Basin	
Capcoal underground	Aquila, Bundoora, German Creek, Grasstrees, Oak Park, Southern Colliery	Queensland	22.9026°S 148.551°E	Operating Mine	Coal - black	Bowen Basin	
Blair Athol		Queensland	22.6905°S 147.527°E	Operating Mine	Coal - black	Bowen Basin	
Avon		New South Wales	34.4804°S 150.7056°E	Closed	Coal - black	Sydney Basin	
Grosvenor	Moranbah	Queensland	21.8732°S 147.9927°E	Operating Mine	Coal - black	Bowen Basin	
Cullen Valley	Feldmast	New South Wales	33.2693°S 150.0162°E	Under Development	Coal - black	Sydney Basin	
Ulan	Ulan No.2, Ulan West	New South Wales	32.2469°S 149.75°E	Operating Mine	Coal - black	Sydney Basin	
Kogan Creek	Brigalow, Kogan	Queensland	26.8957°S 150.7726°E	Operating Mine	Coal - black	Surat Basin	
Awaba	Awaba State	New South Wales	33.0264°S 151.5492°E	Closed	Coal - black	Sydney Basin	
North Cliff		New South Wales	34.1956°S 150.8603°E	Historic Mine	Coal - black	Sydney Basin	
United		New South Wales	32.5568°S 151.01°E	Operating Mine	Coal - black	Sydney Basin	
Wambo	Homestead, Wambo Complex, Wollemi	New South Wales	32.5782°S 150.9981°E	Operating Mine	Coal - black	Sydney Basin	
Premier	Collie Operations, Premier	Western Australia	33.3917°S 116.2865°E	Operating Mine	Coal - black	Collie Basin	
Teralba		New South Wales	32.9568°S 151.6°E	Closed	Coal - black	Sydney Basin	
Nattai		New South Wales	34.0642°S 150.4221°E	Historic Mine	Coal - black	Sydney Basin	
Newlands, Suttor, Eastern (RCM), Newlands OC	Eastern Creek	Queensland	21.2544°S 147.901°E	Operating Mine	Coal - black	Bowen Basin	
Poitrel	Mavis Downs, Wotoga and Morambah, includes Winchester	Queensland	22.0412°S 148.2344°E	Operating Mine	Coal - black	Bowen Basin	
Cullenswood		Tasmania	41.6178°S 148.1523°E	Care And Maintenance	Coal - black	Tasmania Basin	
Foxleigh	includes Foxleigh East	Queensland	22.9978°S 148.8039°E	Operating Mine	Coal - black	Bowen Basin	
Bengalla		New South Wales	32.2715°S 150.846°E	Operating Mine	Coal - black	Sydney Basin	
Rolleston		Queensland	24.4441°S 148.4106°E	Operating Mine	Coal - black	Bowen Basin	
West Wallsend	includes Lachlan proposal	New South Wales	32.9479°S 151.6048°E	Closed	Coal - black	Sydney Basin	
Minyango		Queensland	23.6326°S 148.9147°E	Feasibility	Coal - black	Bowen Basin	
Yarrabee	Yarrabee North	Queensland	23.3177°S 149.0264°E	Operating Mine	Coal - black	Bowen Basin	
Airly	Airly Mountain	New South Wales	33.0978°S 150.0148°E	Operating Mine	Coal - black	Sydney Basin	
Dawson	Dawson Complex, Moura	Queensland	24.6168°S 150.0592°E	Operating Mine	Coal - black	Bowen Basin	
Mount Owen	Glendell, Ravensworth East	New South Wales	32.3868°S 151.1°E	Operating Mine	Coal - black	Sydney Basin	
Dartbrook	Kayuga	New South Wales	32.183°S 150.8402°E	Care And Maintenance	Coal - black	Sydney Basin	
Phillipson	Corner Gate, Ingomar, Lake Phillipson, Penrhyn	South Australia	29.3971°S 134.5°E	Feasibility	Coal - black	Arckaringa Basin	
Munmorah		New South Wales	33.2068°S 151.52°E	Closed	Coal - black	Sydney Basin	
Metropolitan		New South Wales	34.1849°S 150.9966°E	Operating Mine	Coal - black	Sydney Basin	
Isaac Plains		Queensland	21.992°S 148.108°E	Operating Mine	Coal - black	Bowen Basin	
Mandalong	Cooranbong Extension, Mandalong South	New South Wales	33.1268°S 151.45°E	Operating Mine	Coal - black	Sydney Basin	
Canyon Mine	Whitehaven	New South Wales	30.7338°S 150.1698°E	Closed	Coal - black	Gunnedah Basin	
Russell Vale (NRE 1)	Balgownie No1, Bellambi West, Bellpac No1, Gibsons, Russell Vale, South Bulli	New South Wales	34.3468°S 150.87°E	Operating Mine	Coal - black	Sydney Basin	
Blackwater	Stewarton, Tannyfoil, Taurus, Wilpeena	Queensland	23.6856°S 148.8074°E	Operating Mine	Coal - black	Bowen Basin	
Moorvale		Queensland	21.9955°S 148.3536°E	Operating Mine	Coal - black	Bowen Basin	
Kestrel	Gordonstone, Kestrel West, Ti Tree	Queensland	23.242°S 148.3703°E	Operating Mine	Coal - black	Bowen Basin	
Clermont		Queensland	22.6892°S 147.6308°E	Operating Mine	Coal - black	Bowen Basin	
Baralaba	Dawson Valley	Queensland	24.1649°S 149.8032°E	Operating Mine	Coal - black	Bowen Basin	
Hunter Valley Operations	Carrington, Chestnut, Howick, Hunter Valley No 1 & No 2, Lemington, Riverview	New South Wales	32.5104°S 150.992°E	Operating Mine	Coal - black	Sydney Basin	
Myuna		New South Wales	33.0601°S 151.5687°E	Operating Mine	Coal - black	Sydney Basin	
Jellinbah East		Queensland	23.4069°S 148.9506°E	Operating Mine	Coal - black	Bowen Basin	
Charbon		New South Wales	32.8964°S 149.9777°E	Care And Maintenance	Coal - black	Sydney Basin	
Tower		New South Wales	34.1669°S 150.72°E	Closed	Coal - black	Sydney Basin	
Peak Downs	Caval Ridge, Isaac River	Queensland	22.2199°S 148.1731°E	Operating Mine	Coal - black	Bowen Basin	
Angus Place		New South Wales	33.3492°S 150.199°E	Care And Maintenance	Coal - black	Sydney Basin	
Newstan	Newstan Extension, Newstan Lochiel	New South Wales	32.9758°S 151.5769°E	Care And Maintenance	Coal - black	Sydney Basin	
Brimstone	Brimstone No1 and No2	New South Wales	33.9967°S 150.4556°E	Closed	Coal - black	Sydney Basin	
Bloomfield		New South Wales	32.7922°S 151.567°E	Operating Mine	Coal - black	Sydney Basin	
Maules Creek		New South Wales	30.5451°S 150.1542°E	Operating Mine	Coal - black	Gunnedah Basin	
Muswellbrook	Sandy Creek	New South Wales	32.245°S 150.9414°E	Operating Mine	Coal - black	Sydney Basin	
Millennium	West Poitrel	Queensland	22.025°S 148.213°E	Operating Mine	Coal - black	Bowen Basin	
Integra (Glennies Creek)		New South Wales	32.4688°S 151.135°E	Operating Mine	Coal - black	Sydney Basin	
South Walker Creek	Kemmis-Walker	Queensland	21.7709°S 148.4427°E	Operating Mine	Coal - black	Bowen Basin	
Minerva	Athena	Queensland	23.9214°S 148.0471°E	Closed	Coal - black	Bowen Basin	
Burton	Burton Downs, Kerlong, Plumtree	Queensland	21.5886°S 148.1726°E	Care And Maintenance	Coal - black	Bowen Basin	
Saraji		Queensland	22.3694°S 148.2911°E	Operating Mine	Coal - black	Bowen Basin	
Ravensworth UG	Nardell Colliery, Newpac Colliery	New South Wales	32.4366°S 151.0375°E	Care And Maintenance	Coal - black	Sydney Basin	
Rixs Creek		New South Wales	32.5268°S 151.13°E	Operating Mine	Coal - black	Sydney Basin	
Middlemount		Queensland	22.8481°S 148.6316°E	Operating Mine	Coal - black	Bowen Basin	
Maddingley		Victoria	37.7043°S 144.4402°E	Operating Mine	Coal - brown	Otway Basin	Cenozoic
Dendrobium		New South Wales	34.3769°S 150.76°E	Operating Mine	Coal - black	Sydney Basin	
Ironbark No.1 (prev. Ellensfield)	Ironbark No. 1	Queensland	21.762°S 148.254°E	Operating Mine	Coal - black	Bowen Basin	
Ravensworth North		New South Wales	32.44°S 150.997°E	Operating Mine	Coal - black	Sydney Basin	
Great Greta		New South Wales	32.5275°S 151.4197°E	Closed	Coal - black	Sydney Basin	
Cameby Downs	50259, 50260, 50269, ML50258	Queensland	26.5786°S 150.2872°E	Operating Mine	Coal - black	Surat Basin	Mesozoic
Ivanhoe North	Ivanhoe No2	New South Wales	33.3569°S 150.01°E	Historic Mine	Coal - black	Sydney Basin	
West Cliff		New South Wales	34.2175°S 150.8244°E	Closed	Coal - black	Sydney Basin	
Gregory	Gregory-Crinum	Queensland	23.1722°S 148.3563°E	Operating Mine	Coal - black	Bowen Basin	
Bloodwood Creek	Underground Coal Gasification	Queensland	27.15°S 150.78°E	Closed	Coal - black	Surat Basin	
Maxwell	CL229, CL395, Drayton South, EL5460, ML1531, Mount Arthur South, Saddlers Creek	New South Wales	32.4268°S 150.83°E	Operating Mine	Coal - black	Sydney Basin	
Tahmoor	Bargo, Tahmoor North	New South Wales	34.2508°S 150.5795°E	Operating Mine	Coal - black	Sydney Basin	
Curragh North	Pisces	Queensland	23.3799°S 148.8738°E	Operating Mine	Coal - black	Bowen Basin	
Saraji South	Norwich Park	Queensland	22.6158°S 148.4294°E	Care And Maintenance	Coal - black	Bowen Basin	
Glendell		New South Wales	32.4512°S 151.0776°E	Operating Mine	Coal - black	Sydney Basin	
Donaldson	Abel	New South Wales	32.793°S 151.5765°E	Care And Maintenance	Coal - black	Sydney Basin	
Stanhope	Merrywood	Tasmania	41.7735°S 147.96°E	Historic Mine	Coal - black	Tasmania Basin	
Boggabri		New South Wales	30.5904°S 150.1633°E	Operating Mine	Coal - black	Gunnedah Basin	
Wongawilli Colliery (NRE)	Elouera, Nebo	New South Wales	34.4749°S 150.7357°E	Care And Maintenance	Coal - black	Sydney Basin	
Hail Creek		Queensland	21.5054°S 148.4068°E	Operating Mine	Coal - black	Bowen Basin	
Oaky Creek	Includes Alliance, Oaky No1, Oaky North	Queensland	23.0416°S 148.4932°E	Operating Mine	Coal - black	Bowen Basin	
Chain Valley		New South Wales	33.1631°S 151.55°E	Operating Mine	Coal - black	Sydney Basin	
Commodore	Millmerran	Queensland	27.9303°S 151.2791°E	Operating Mine	Coal - black	Clarence-Moreton Basin	
New Acland	Acland, Glen Roslyn, Manningvale East, Manningvale West, Sabine	Queensland	27.2696°S 151.7078°E	Care And Maintenance	Coal - black	Clarence-Moreton Basin	
North Goonyella - Eaglefield		Queensland	21.6476°S 147.9766°E	Care And Maintenance	Coal - black	Bowen Basin	
Yallourn	East Field, Maryvale Field, Yallourn East, Yallourn Township	Victoria	38.1951°S 146.3604°E	Operating Mine	Coal - brown	Gippsland Basin	Cenozoic
Clarence	includes Blue Mountains	New South Wales	33.4565°S 150.2439°E	Operating Mine	Coal - black	Sydney Basin	
Austar	Bellbird, Pelton-Ellalong, Southland	New South Wales	32.8669°S 151.3046°E	Closed	Coal - black	Sydney Basin	
Sonoma	Cows	Queensland	20.62°S 147.86°E	Operating Mine	Coal - black	Bowen Basin	
Eagle Downs	Peak Downs East	Queensland	22.1928°S 148.1905°E	Feasibility	Coal - black	Bowen Basin	
Narrabri	Narabri South, Narrabri North	New South Wales	30.52°S 149.85°E	Operating Mine	Coal - black	Gunnedah Basin	
Sunnyside		New South Wales	30.99°S 150.09°E	Care And Maintenance	Coal - black	Gunnedah Basin	
Carborough Downs	Broadlea North	Queensland	21.9502°S 148.2094°E	Operating Mine	Coal - black	Bowen Basin	
Western Main		New South Wales	33.3769°S 150.05°E	Historic Mine	Coal - black	Sydney Basin	
Avondale NRE	Avondale	New South Wales	34.508°S 150.774°E	Historic Mine	Coal - black	Sydney Basin	
Pine Dale		New South Wales	33.297°S 150.065°E	Care And Maintenance	Coal - black	Sydney Basin	
Tarrawonga	East Boggabri	New South Wales	30.638°S 150.163°E	Operating Mine	Coal - black	Gunnedah Basin	
Werris Creek		New South Wales	31.407°S 150.6395°E	Operating Mine	Coal - black	Gunnedah Basin	
South Bulli		New South Wales	34.3497°S 150.8892°E	Historic Mine	Coal - black	Sydney Basin	
Burgowan		Queensland	25.3119°S 152.5649°E	Historic Mine	Coal - black	Maryborough Basin	
Moonee		New South Wales	33.1397°S 151.6317°E	Closed	Coal - black	Sydney Basin	
Fingal	Duncan	Tasmania	41.6396°S 148.0155°E	Historic Mine	Coal - black	Tasmania Basin	
New Wallsend No2	Gretley	New South Wales	32.9164°S 151.6783°E	Historic Mine	Coal - black	Sydney Basin	
Washpool		Queensland	23.474°S 148.763°E	Feasibility	Coal - black	Bowen Basin	
New Hill		Queensland	27.6202°S 152.8321°E	Historic Mine	Coal - black	Ipswich Basin	
Tarong (Meandu)	Tarong	Queensland	26.8135°S 151.9115°E	Operating Mine	Coal - black	Tarong Basin	
Endeavour	Newvale No2	New South Wales	33.2272°S 151.5622°E	Historic Mine	Coal - black	Sydney Basin	
Enhance Place		New South Wales	33.3673°S 150.066°E	Closed	Coal - black	Sydney Basin	
Capcoal - Aquila		Queensland	22.9041°S 148.5499°E	Care And Maintenance	Coal - black	Bowen Basin	
Wollombi		Queensland	21.2544°S 147.901°E	Operating Mine	Coal - black	Bowen Basin	
Gloucester		New South Wales	32.1177°S 151.9736°E	Operating Mine	Coal - black	Gloucester Basin	
Swanbank		Queensland	27.6552°S 152.821°E	Closed	Coal - black	Ipswich Basin	Mesozoic
Appin	Appin (Bulli seam)and Dendrobium (Wongawilli seam) mines	New South Wales	34.1606°S 150.8634°E	Operating Mine	Coal - black	Sydney Basin	
Wilton		Queensland	23.323°S 148.551°E	Feasibility	Coal - black	Bowen Basin	
Fairhill		Queensland	23.323°S 148.551°E	Feasibility	Coal - black	Bowen Basin	

== Major coal mining companies ==
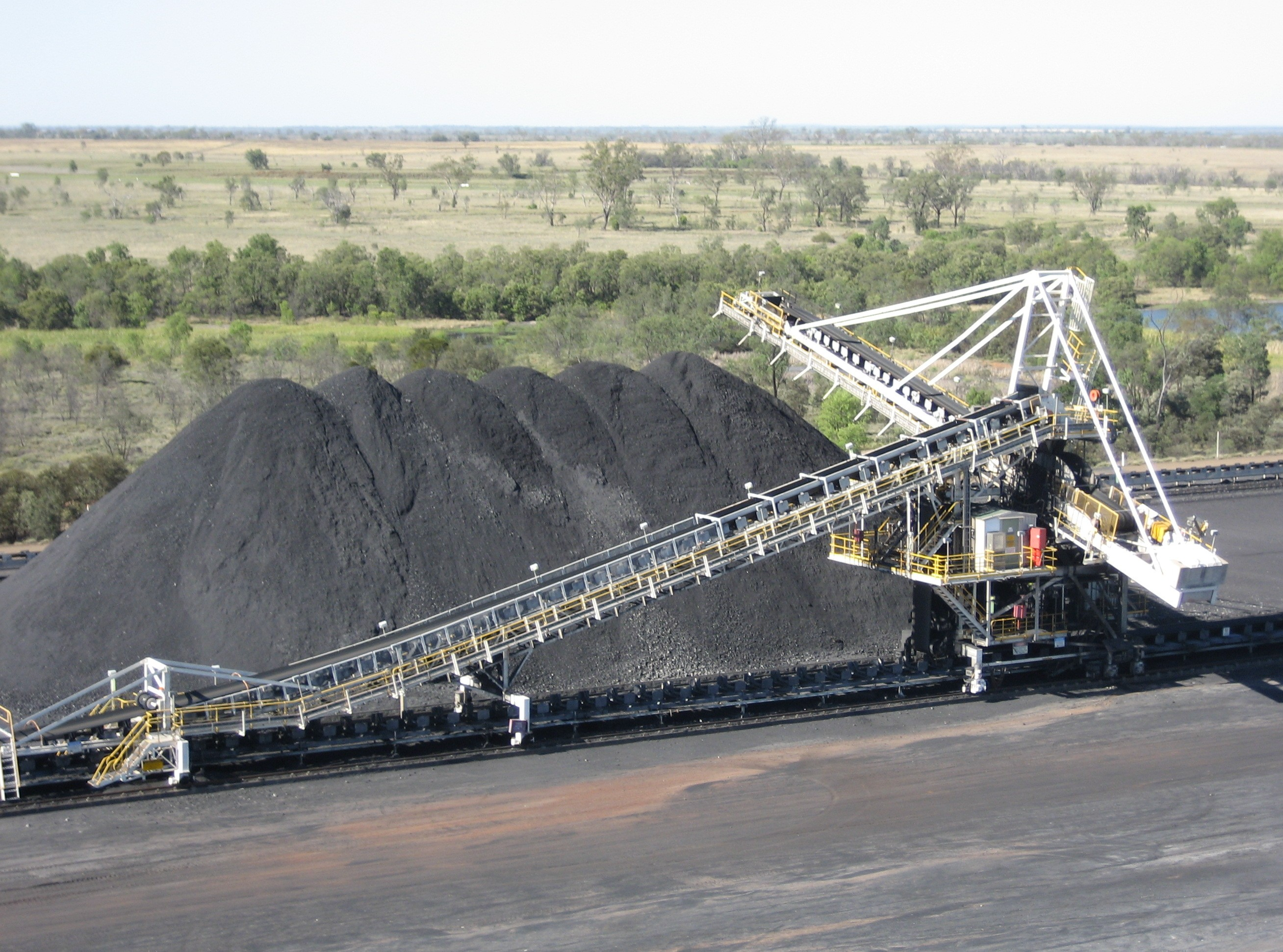
Kestrel coal mine, 2007

The largest coal producers in Australia are BHP, Glencore, Yancoal, Peabody, Anglo American and Whitehaven Coal. As at June 2023, coal companies in Australia were making windfall profits due to the Russian invasion of Ukraine. However, international sanctions against Russia and the energy transition in Europe are also forcing Russia to direct its coal exports eastward, creating more competition with Australian exports in the long term.

== Future planned coal mining ==
As of 2025, several new coal mines are still planned for development in Australia. This includes Olive Downs mine, to be operated by Pembroke Resources, near Coppabella, Queensland. In 2021, the federal government agreed to loan the project A$175 million to begin the first stages of its development. In April 2022, the construction of the mine commenced. Production is expected to begin in 2023.

== Divestment from coal ==
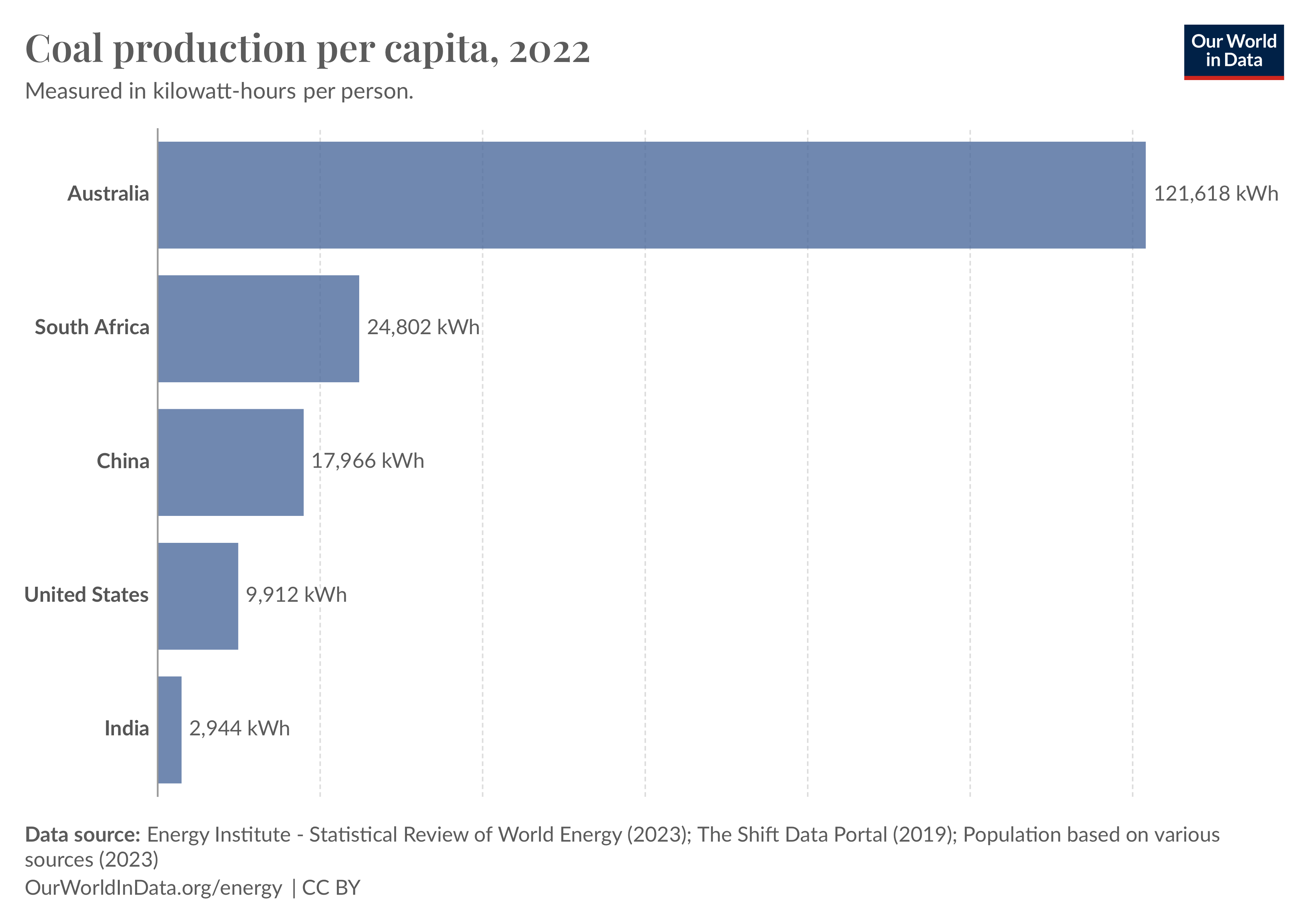
Coal production per person was the highest in the world in 2022

Australia's coal policy is aligning with legislative targets to reach net zero emissions by 2050 and reduce emissions by 43% by 2030. There's no fixed schedule for phasing out coal electricity plants or coal mining activities. Coal-fired generators must give a three-and-a-half-year notice before shutting down.

Several mines have announced plans to wind-down operations in coal within set timeframes, alongside planned closures of coal power plants in Australia. This includes Werris Creek (2025).

In 2016, Glencore announced that Tahmoor Colliery would be closed by 2019. However, Glencore later sold the mine to SIMEC in 2018, who still operate it.

In 2018, Rio Tinto completed its exit from coal mining with the sale of the Kestrel coal mine.

BHP planned to sell the Mount Arthur mine in 2022, but failed to attract a viable offer and decided to continue operations there until financial year 2030.

In August 2022, BHP completed its sale of the BHP Mitsui Coal to Stanmore Resources.

Banks such as Westpac have introduced restrictions on lending for new thermal coal mines, including a limit of 6,300 kilocalories per kilogram for new projects. By 2021, Australia' big four banks were committed to leaving thermal coal by 2030, pledging alignment with the Paris Climate Agreement. In 2021, ANZ concluded that the Port of Newcastle could become a stranded asset. ANZ took the opportunity to divest when the port was refinancing.

== Phase-out ==
Australian power stations are expected to stop burning coal by 2038 or earlier. The Australian electricity market has been moving away from coal as renewables, especially solar power are developed. The proportion of electricity generated by coal-fired power stations dropped to a record low of less than 50% in early 2025.

There is no true transition to a clean economy if the federal government continues to approve new fossil fuel projects. Leading global authorities, including the International Energy Agency, the United Nations, and the scientific community, have consistently stated that no new gas fields, coal mines, or mine extensions are necessary to meet climate goals. The Australia Institute's Coal Mine Tracker keeps track of coal mine proposals and their potential emissions.

In 2023–24, Australian governments allocated $14.5 billion in spending and tax incentives to support the fossil fuel industry, representing a 31% increase from 2022–23. Forward estimates indicate that subsidies have risen from $57 billion to a record $65 billion, an amount 6.5 times larger than the Housing Australia Future Fund. Critics argue that these subsidies contribute to greenwashing and undermine efforts to implement effective climate policies. Advocates for subsidy reform highlight that reducing fossil fuel subsidies could lead to significant emissions reductions while reallocating funds toward public services and sustainable initiatives.

== Environmental impacts ==
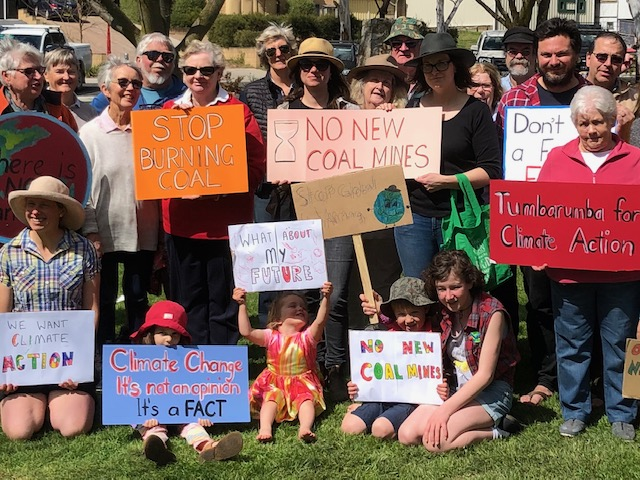
September 2019 climate strike in Tumbarumba, Australia

Both underground and open-cut mines generate significant environmental impacts, including modified topography, soil erosion, water pollution, air pollution and acid water drainage. The coal industry claims that extensive rehabilitation of areas mined helps to ensure that land capability, after coal mining, meets agreed and appropriate standards. It is estimated that air pollution from coal-fired power stations in Australia is responsible for 785 premature deaths each year. According to a report done by leading epidemiologist, Dr Ben Ewald, Over half of these premature deaths were from a power station group located in Sydney.

Coal is the principal fossil fuel used in power generation not only in Australia but in many other countries. Links between coal mining, coal burning, and climate change are being discussed widely in Australia.

On 19 December 2024, the Australian government approved three major coal mines—Caval Ridge, Boggabri, and Lake Vermont—projected to produce 350 million tonnes of coal and 936 million tonnes of emissions. The approval was controversial, especially as the Environment Minister Tanya Plibersek defended the projects by emphasizing their use in steel production. However, critics like the Australia Institute argue that all coal combustion contributes to climate change, regardless of its end use.

On 27 November 2006 the Land and Environment Court of New South Wales judge Justice Nicola Pain made the decision to set aside the Director-General's acceptance of the Environmental Assessment for the Anvil Hill coal mine, on the grounds that it did not include a comprehensive greenhouse gas assessment, even though the proposed mining of coal was for export. However, on 7 June 2007 the planning minister for NSW Frank Sartor reversed this decision and approved the mine, attaching a list of 80 conditions to the mines operation including conservation offsets.

An international climate think tank produced a report that concluded Australia's coal mines are emitting twice as much methane as national estimates, finding a massive under-reporting of methane emissions in Australia. As part of the nation's commitment to the Paris Agreement Australia must reduce its emissions by 26–28% in 2030 compared to 2005. According to the International Energy Agency, no new coal projects or gas projects can be approved if the world is to achieve net zero emissions by 2050.

Environmental Justice

People in Australia who have originally and newly live near and work in mines are being disproportionately affected by the effects of climate change due to coal mining. Mining and resource extraction leave long-term environmental damage, and social harm is experienced most by local or vulnerable communities, while people who live further away from these mines benefit. As resource sectors expand in Australia, the social and physical implications worsen. Pollution from mining is a growing concern among those who live and work in coal-mining areas. Coal mines have had detrimental effects on the land. An example of this is from the book, The Dark Side of Australia’s Resources Rush, Clearly writes, “Simultaneously, agricultural land in Eastern Australia is being dotted by an increasing number of coal-seam gas wells, with major implications for people and environments. The industry has the potential to: contaminate underground acquifers; produce billions of litres of unmanageablesaline waste water that will yield millions of tonnes of salt and threaten farmland, river systems and wetlands; overlay an extensive network of access roads and pipelines; accelerate climate change by leaking methane gas into the atmosphere; trigger earthquakes; depress land values.” More specifically, a region in Gippsland, Victoria )Latrobe Valley) is significantly known for its brown coal mining. According to ABC news reporter, Jarrod Whitaker, based in Gippsland s office, “researchers found the Latrobe Valley, which is home to the Yallourn and Loy Yang A and B power stations, had the highest concentrations in Victoria. The Greenpeace report attributed 37 deaths in the south-east Gippsland region to pollution from coal plants, with almost half of those in the Latrobe Valley.” These findings came days after research that showed “unborn children in the Latrobe Valley who were exposed to toxic smoke during the 2014 Hazelwood coal mine fire were more likely to develop respiratory conditions than children who inhaled the smoke themselves.”

The Hazelwood fire burned for four weeks and released smoke and ash that settled to nearby neighborhoods of Morwell located in Latrove Valley, Victoria which are home to many lower-income families. This is also the location of the Yallourn and Loy Yang A and B power stations. People were experiencing symptoms such as “headaches; nausea; shortness of breath; sore throats; diarrhoea; nose bleeds; sore eyes; chest pain; and fatigue…On 28 February, the Victorian Chief Health Officer advised that the elderly, unwell, children and pregnant women should temporarily leave South Morwell. Government grants of up to $1250 were made available to assist with their temporary relocation.” According to the Australian Barreau of statistics, the median weekly household income is just about $1250. This amount of money is nearly not enough to support a whole lower-income family be relocated and support their everyday needs. Despite these issues, governmental positions like Tanya Plibersek, environmental minister, defend projects of adding more major coal mines. Not only has she approved these large mines, but Conservation groups like the Wilderness Society also said she has “not complied with a legal requirement to create recovery plans for 11 species — including Tasmanian wedge-tailed eagles, greater gliders and lungfish — threatened with extinction” at the beginning of 2025. This contradicts her position of Environment Minister at the time. She is an “environmentalist” although opposing climate action at the same time.

Nonhuman species are often affected by coal mines. For example, according to ecological researcher Bill Ellis, “A population of endangered koalas has been spotted by drones in a patch of bushland earmarked for a coal mine expansion.” Now, koalas are endangered in Queensland, Australia, and expanding mines into their habitats endanger them more than they already are from the effects of climate change. Additionally, Ellis further explains how “Global mining giant Glencore plans to expand the footprint of the Hail Creek metallurgical and thermal coal export mine, a move its environmental assessment shows will disrupt nearly 600 hectares of ‘ecologically significant’ koala habitat.” According to Stephanie Carrick, the manager and Campaign lead for the Sydney Basin Koala Network, Koalas play a crucial role in the ecosystem by supporting biodiversity and protecting their habitat which automatically protects many other insects and bird that rely on the same environment.

According to local activists, harming nonhuman species is a problem of environmental injustice koalas, and all other species found near these toxic mines, have the right to a healthy habitat that supports them so that they can support the environment in return. Queensland Conservation Council coal and gas campaigner Charlie Cox, who believes in an urgent transition away from fossil fuels, said “the discovery of a significant koala population should ring alarm bells …If the Albanese government means it when they say they are serious about no new extinctions, then they must halt all coal project assessments in the region until the population size, health and habitat can be thoroughly investigated.”

There have been people living in the locations of where these mines are for 1000s of years. An example fo mines being built on people home lands are Indigenous lands, according to Research Institute, Samy Andres Leyton-Flo, “Many mine sites are located on or near Indigenous Lands (ILs) and close to pristine ecosystems, which have caused social, economic, and environmental impacts in those areas.” Specifically, Aboriginal and Torres Strait Islander communities are living in mining regions within Australia. According to Jon Altman, Foundation director of the Centre for Aboriginal Economic Policy Research, “Negotiations and agreements have failed to deliver community benefit packages and economic development for most Indigenous people. For example, higher pollution levels are common in areas where Indigenous people with the lowest socioeconomic status reside.” This environmental inequality is reinforced by legal frameworks that limit Indigenous control over land use. One specific land act is the Aboriginal Land Right Act, but it “does not give Indigenous communities the power to reject mining development projects on their lands, leading to the exclusion of Indigenous Australians from decision-making regarding resource develop-ment on their traditional lands.” As a result of this limited legal authority, Indigenous communities have turned to direct action to oppose these unwanted projects. An example of this is how the Aboriginal people of Australia have protested mines on their traditional lands. As of July of 2025, a small ceremonial fire has been burning for 1,300 days on the traditional land of the Wangan and Jagalingou (W&J) people. They have been protesting for over four years against the Carmichael coal mine, one of the country's most controversial mining projects. This mine is located very close to the traditional land of the Wangan and Jagalingou people. The W&J people believe this land was created by a powerful ancestral being in ancient stories of theirs that is associated with water, creation, and land.

The Doongmabulla Springs are connected to a larger water system that is above one of the largest untapped coal reserves in the world. According to hydrogeologist Matthew Currell, “hydrocarbons began to be detected within the spring waters themselves.” Because of these hydrocarbons W&J people have been arguing that the mine is “threatening their sacred water source, and that their rights, culture and connection to ’country’, as Indigenous Australians term their ancestral homeland, are being ignored.”

=== Protests against coal ===
One of the first protests against coal development occurred to the south of Sydney in the early 1970s. Clutha Development wanted to build a new coal loading facility at Coalcliff. Coal was to be stored in heaps along the coast. Local activist, Judy Gjedsted, organised protests which successfully ended the proposal. Gjedsted, concerned that coal dust would impact her local environment, formed the South Coast Organisation Opposing Pollution (SCOOP). Gjedsted and SCOOP joined parades and carried signs denouncing the Clutha development. After a lot of work, “SCOOP, the National Trust, Milo Dunphy and Edward St John’s Clutha Committee worked together to organise a public meeting at Sydney Town Hall. It was packed with 3,000 people and the state minister for mines and conservation, Wal Fife, spoke in favour of the development.” The Sydney Morning Herald reported that he was “booed continuously by the crowd for 20 minutes.” Seven months later, Clutha announced that it would not continue with the project, “citing falling coal prices and the cost of the development.”

In November 2021, anti-coal protestors led by Blockade Australia disrupted activity at the world’s largest coal terminal, the Port of Newcastle, by abseilling from equipment and obstructing railway tracks. The protests lasted for 10 days and 17 people were arrested. Coordinated action by Blockade Australia in June 2023 saw ports in Newcastle, Brisbane and Melbourne targeted. In April 2023, about 50 people caused a train loaded with coal to come to a halt at Newcastle. Some of the protestors then climbed on top of a carriage loaded with coal, remaining there for almost three hours.

The Carmichael mine run by Adani Group, planned since 2012 and opened in 2021, drew national and international opposition, both from climate activists and traditional owners. In August 2019, the government extinguished 1,385 hectares of Wangan and Jaggalingou native title in order to grant Adani title to the land. Protestor activity at the mine has included 40 people blocking the entrance of the mine, with two chaining themselves to a drum of reinforced concrete.

In November 2023, one of the largest protests against coal and fossil fuels in Australia took place in Newcastle. A 30-hour blockade consisting of kayaks, surfboards and pontoons across a shipping channel blocked coal exports from the port. The occupation was organised by Rising Tide. More than 100 people were arrested after staying longer than an agreed deadline.

== Environmental regulation of coal mining ==
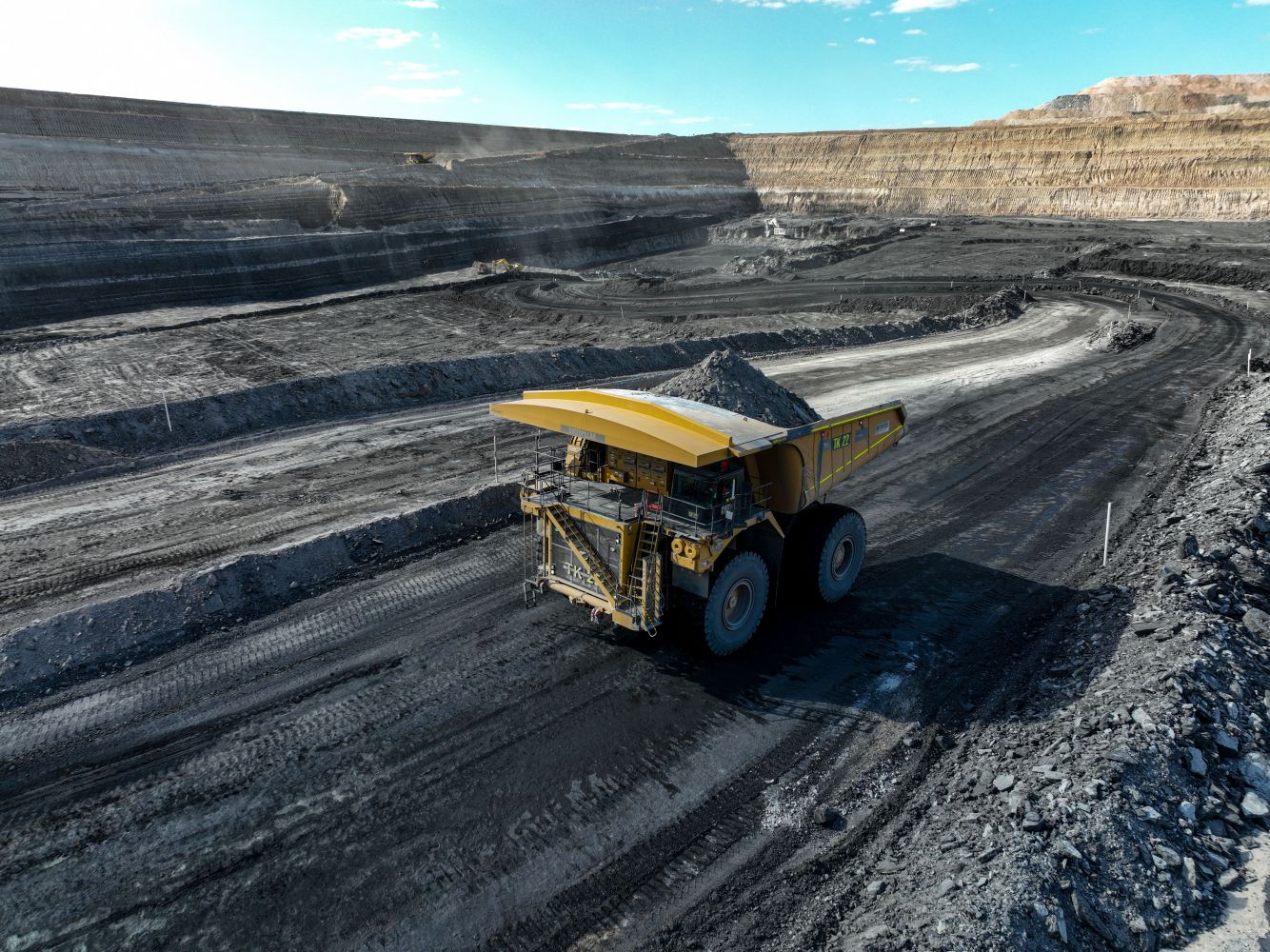
A haul truck moves overburden at Carmichael coal mine, 2022

The Australian commonwealth government is responsible for making policy on off-shore exploration of coal and resources, while the governments of the states and territories are responsible for policy on onshore exploration.

The Australian government is pushing to keep these industries because it offers so many jobs. According to the LA Times, “The industry employs about 26,000 people and the government will establish a Future Jobs and Investment Authority to help transition workers into new careers.” A new group that is fighting to promote coal expansion is Coal Australia. According to the Queensland conservation council, “It presents itself as a voice for communities and workers, but in reality, it's fronted by ex-media producers1 and backed by some of the largest coal corporations in the country.”

Movements and groups that have been working against the expansion of coal mines in Australia include Lock the Gate, Stop Adani, and Move Beyond Coal. These groups focus on protecting water resources, preventing climate change, and defending land rights, with specific campaigns targeting projects. The groups have been constantly campaigning and spreading awareness on the harms of these mines.

=== Commonwealth law ===
The main Commonwealth environmental laws potentially applicable to coal mining are the Environment Protection and Biodiversity Conservation Act 1999 (EPBC Act) and the Clean Energy Act 2011. The EPBC Act is triggered if a proposed action is likely to have a significant impact on a matter of national environmental significance, for example federally listed threatened species and groundwater impacts.

In September 2022, the Australian Parliament passed the Climate Change Bill. It includes the national targets of cutting emissions by at least 43% by 2030 (compared with 2005) and reaching net zero by 2050. The bill is largely symbolic, it doesn't stipulate how the country will get to its targets.

=== State laws ===
==== New South Wales ====
Relevant laws are mining law, land use planning law, biodiversity law and water law. New South Wales (NSW) operates a planning system in which coal mines and other environmentally harmful projects are frequently approved with limited resistance. As one of the world’s largest coal exporters, NSW plays a significant role in global fossil carbon emissions. Consequently, the state's decisions on climate change and fossil fuel policy are likely to have enduring global implications.

Recently, the Australia Institute submitted a contribution to the NSW Parliamentary Inquiry into the state’s planning system and its approach to climate impacts. The submission highlighted concerns that coal mines and other high-emission projects are often approved with minimal scrutiny of their climate consequences. It noted that economic assessments commissioned by project proponents tend to overstate benefits while understating community costs. Strengthening public sector capacity and governance of consultants was recommended to improve decision-making processes.

The Australia Institute has also played an active role in the public debate surrounding the Warkworth Project, beginning with expert economic evidence presented by two of its economists in the New South Wales Land and Environment Court (LEC). This evidence contributed to the Court’s decision to overturn the project's approval. Since then, the Institute has submitted multiple representations and participated in all public hearings on the matter. Throughout its involvement, the Australia Institute has maintained that the project's economic benefits have been overstated by Rio Tinto and its consultants, while the associated environmental and social costs have been downplayed. The Institute argues that the overall economic advantages do not justify the project's significant environmental and social impacts.

===== Pollution law =====
Coal mining requires a pollution control ('environment protection') licence under the Protection of the Environment Operations Act 1997 (NSW) if it exceeds the following thresholds set out in Schedule 1 of the Act: if it is mining, processing or handling of coal (including tailings and chitter) at underground mines or open cut mines and (a) it has a capacity to produce more than 500 tonnes of coal per day, or (b) it has disturbed, is disturbing or will disturb a total surface area of more than 4 hectares of land by: (i) clearing or excavating, or (ii) constructing dams, ponds, drains, roads, railways or conveyors, or (iii) storing or depositing overburden or coal (including tailings and chitter).

==== Queensland ====
In March 2020, the Queensland Resources Council introduced safety protocols to promote the health of coal mine workers amidst the international spread of COVID-19. These included improvements to social distancing of workers, disallowing visitors from the public to enter the sites and checking the temperature of workers at mine site entries.

== Research on Coal Mines ==
The Australia Institute reveals that the NSW government allocates five times more funding to promoting coal than to supporting mining communities in transitioning away from it. In the 2022–23 financial year, coal royalties accounted for approximately 4.2% of the total revenue of the New South Wales (NSW) Government, amounting to around $4.5 billion. This increase was attributed to a surge in global coal prices following Russia’s invasion of Ukraine.

This report advocates for the dissolution of Coal Innovation NSW and its associated funds. It also recommends the immediate termination of royalty deduction subsidies to LETA.

Two in three (66%) think Australian governments should plan to phase out coal mining and transition into other industries. Despite this, in 2022-23, Australian governments committed $11.1 billion in subsidies for fossil fuel projects. While one in three (33%) want new coal mines to be allowed, just 7% support using taxpayer funds to subsidise those mines.

== See also ==
- Carbon capture and storage in Australia
- Greenhouse Mafia
- Hunter Valley Coal Chain
- Mining in Australia
- Coastal coal-carrying trade of New South Wales
