= Jeebropilly Mine =

Mine in Queensland, Australia

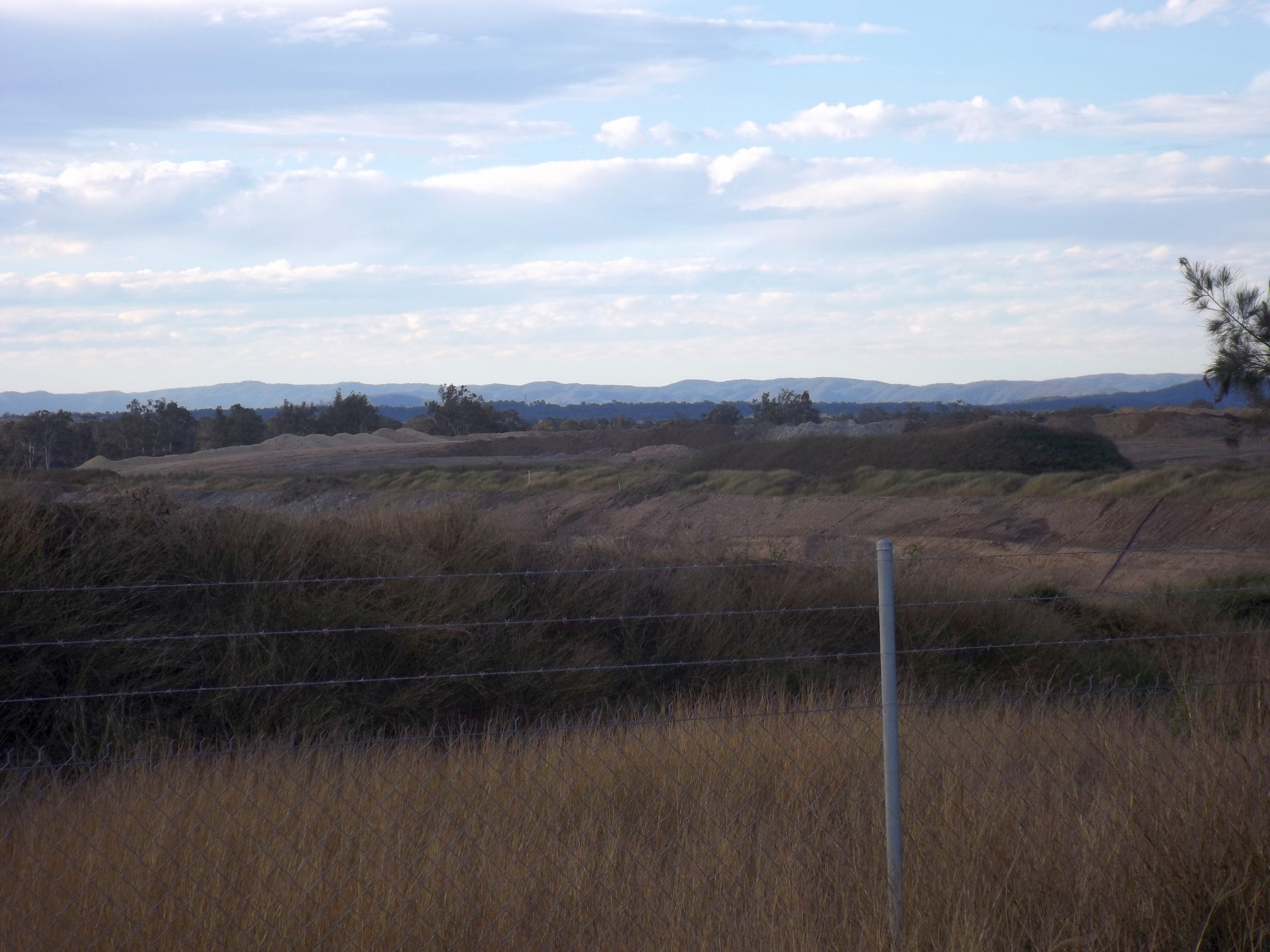
- 2015

- Location in Australia
- Location: Amberley, Queensland, Australia; 27°39′14″S 152°39′54″E
- Opened: 1982
- Closed: 2019
- Company: New Hope Group

The Jeebropilly Mine was an open pit coal mine in the Moreton Basin, near Amberley in South East Queensland. It was owned by New Hope Group.

The mine ceased operations after 25 years of extraction in February 2007. The mine's closure left one operating mine in Ipswich. To offset the loss of production from Jeebropilly Mine, New Hope expanded mining at the New Acland Mine. The coal-washing plant at Jeebropilly continued to operate so that coal from New Oakleigh Mine could be processed.

The mine was recommissioned in 2008 due to high export prices for coal. It closed again in December 2019.

== See also ==
- Coal Mining in Australia
