= New Oakleigh Mine =

Former mine in Queensland, Australia

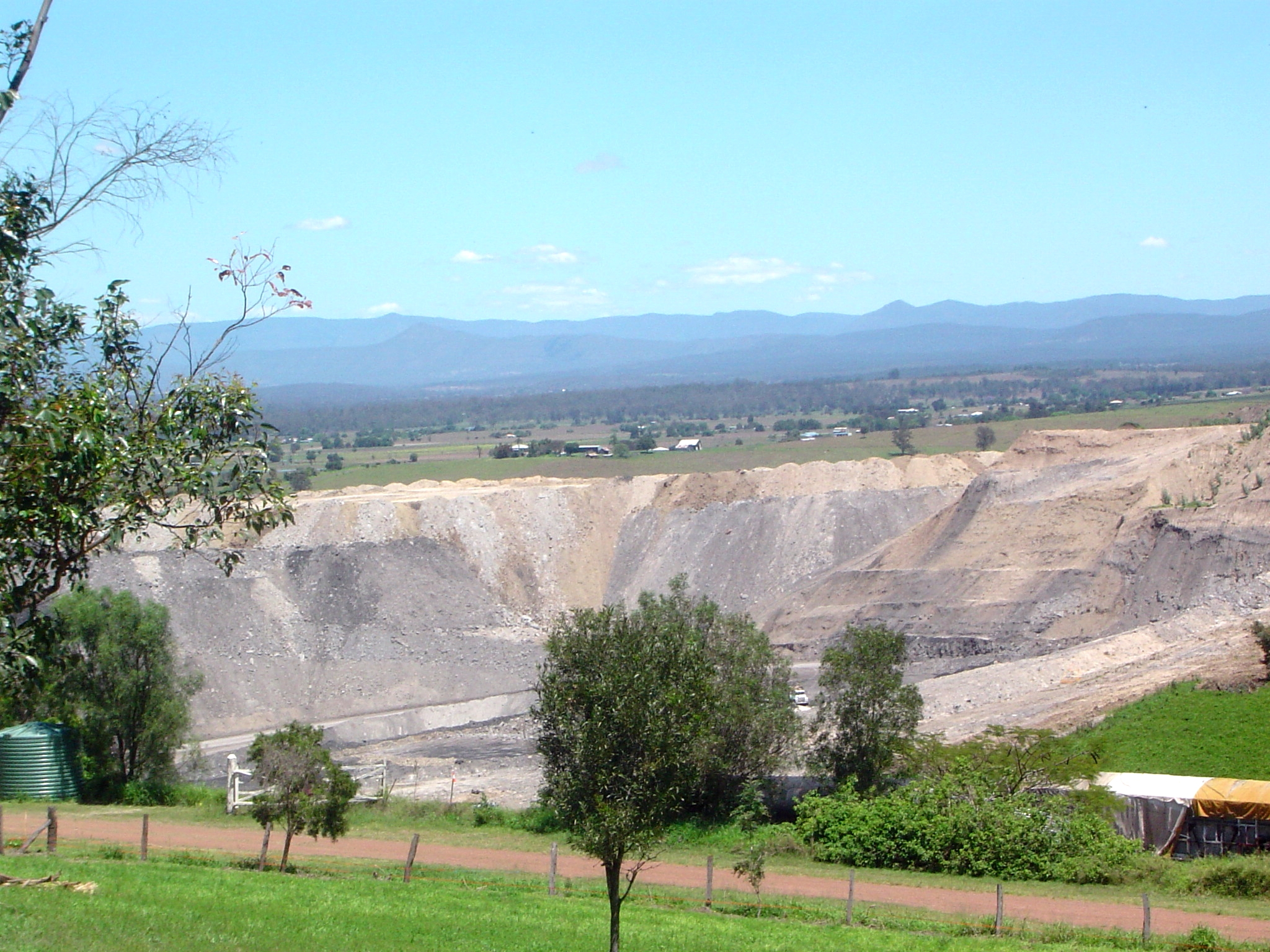
- Mine pit, 2010

- Location in Australia
- Location: Rosewood, Queensland, Australia; 27°37′06.6″S 152°34′31.7″E
- Products: Thermal coal
- Opened: 1948
- Closed: 2013
- Company: New Hope Group

The New Oakleigh Mine was a thermal coal mine in the Moreton Basin. The mine was located north of Rosewood in South East Queensland, Australia. It was one of two operating mines in an area with a rich coal mining history.

Thermal coal was extracted from the open pit by trucks, excavators and front-end loaders.

Mining operations began at the site in 1948.

New Hope Group the owners of the mine, were to cease operations sometime around 2009. However mining activity continued through to 2013 due to higher prices for coal. The mine was officially closed on 25 January 2013.

== See also ==
- Coal Mining in Australia
- Jeebropilly Mine
