= Mount Arthur coal mine =

Coal mine in Muswellbrook, Australia

Coordinates: 32.334°S 150.853°E

- Interactive map of Mount Arthur coal mine
- Location: Muswellbrook, Australia
- Products: Thermal coal
- Opened: 2002
- Company: BHP
- Website: www.bhp.com

Mount Arthur coal mine is an open cut coal mine located near Muswellbrook, Australia. Opened by BHP in 2002, it is the largest coal mine in New South Wales. Until 2020 it produced coal for domestic and overseas customers, when it shifted to only produce for overseas customers. It has a mining capacity of 20 million tons per annum. 21 unique seams are mined. The mine employs 2,000 people.

Coal is moved by Aurizon via the Main Northern railway line to the Port of Newcastle for export. Until 2020, a 10 kilometre conveyor system transported coal to Bayswater and Liddell Power Stations.

In August 2020 BHP announced it intended to sell the mine. In 2021, BHP reevaluated the price of the mine to negative $200 million. This price reflected rehabilitation and restoration commitments. The mine was worth $2 billion just a few years prior. Having been unable to find a buyer, in June 2022 BHP announced it would retain the mine and seek to extend its licence from 2026 until 2030 when it would then close. BHP investigates using the site for a pumped-storage hydroelectricity project after that.

In July 2026, plans were drafted to turn the mine into an industrial precinct, delivering on $5 million investment by the Federal Government, backed by the NSW Government. Federal Minister for Industry and Innovation and Minister for Science Tim Ayres said "these masterplans [will attract] new industries, ... local jobs". BHP is reported to cease all mining activities at Mount Arthur in 2030, committing a $30 million community fund for its project.

== See also ==
- List of mines in Australia
- Coal in Australia
