= Lochend Colliery =

Former coal mine in New South Wales, Australia

- Location in Australia
- Location: Speers Point, New South Wales, Australia; 32°57′40.45″S 151°37′45.10″E
- Opened: 1843
- Closed: 1847

Lochend Colliery was a mine located at Speers Point, New South Wales, Australia.

William Brooks began mining coal at the foot of the Munibung Hill near Speers Point in 1843. The coal was carried by trolleys on a small gauge tram line to a jetty at Speers Point. The coal could either be collected from the jetty or it could be transported to the head of Lake Macquarie, known as Reid's Mistake for collection. The mine ceased operations in 1847.
