= New Acland Mine =

Mine in Queensland, Australia

- Location in Australia
- Location: Acland, Queensland, Australia; 27°18′S 151°38′E
- Products: Thermal coal
- Opened: 2002
- Closed: 2019, the mine is currently mothballed as extension applications have not been approved
- Company: New Hope Group

The New Acland Mine is located adjacent to Acland township, about 10 km north of Oakey on the Darling Downs in Queensland, Australia. Geologically it is part of the Walloon Coal Measures and contains more than 500 million tonnes of coal that is removed by the open cut method. The mine is owned and operated by New Hope Group.

== Stage 1 ==
The mine began operations in 2002. It was officially opened on 13 March 2003 by Premier Peter Beattie. New Acland Mine supplies Tarong Power Station and both domestic and international markets. The mine has previously supplied Swanbank Power Station.

To supply Tarong Power Station beyond 2010 the Queensland Government has indicated its preferred fuel source will be New Acland connected by a conveyor belt. Local reaction to property resumptions, workmen access and building activities was not well received.

To suppress coal dust impacts on communities through which the mine's coal is transported New Hope Coal announced plans to apply a water-based veneer to coal wagons in late 2012.

== Stage 2 ==
Stage 2 of the mine was opened on the 21 March 2007 by Anna Bligh. A total of 300 staff were expected to be working at the New Acland Mine in 2009, producing 4.2 million tonnes of coal a year. 60% of the coal was exported.

In 2019, the mine was fined $9,461 by the Department of Environment & Science for breaching noise limits more than 30 times.

== Stage 3 ==
Stage 3 has been challenged and delayed by the Oakey Coal Action Alliance since 2012. The local land owners are represented by the Environmental Defenders Office. The graziers are concerned that the approval for the mine's expansion will threaten their Darling Downs community and water supply.

In 2010, Stage 3 was undergoing an environmental impact assessment. This expansion would have extended the operating life of the mine until about 2042. It was planned that annual production would rise to 7.5 million tonnes.

In preparation for the mine's expansion directly into the township of Acland most residents left. The last resident in the town, who has refused to leave, is Glenn Beutel.

In March 2012, the incoming Newman government announced it did not support the proposed New Acland Coal Mine Stage 3 Project in its then current form. New Hope then entered into discussions with the State Government about options to continue the operation at the mine.

In response to concerns raised in March 2012 by the incoming Queensland Government about the project's potential impacts, the proponent modified the project, including reducing its scope, resulting in a modified project proposal that was 63 per cent, or 2,300 hectares, smaller than the original proposal. New Acland Coal also proposes to move the existing Jondaryan rail coal load-out facility onto the mine site. An eight-kilometre rail spur would connect the facility to the existing rail line. Additional changes to the plan include leaving the Acland town area, including the Tom Doherty Park, the War Memorial and the Acland No 2 Colliery, in place.

The revised project has also been changed so that the mining operations will sit 10 km from the township of Oakey; the introduction of profiling and veneering technology at the project's rail loading facility and no longer require that the Lagoon Creek be diverted for mining operations.

On 9 November 2012 the Commonwealth Department of Sustainability, Environment, Water, Population and Communities confirmed it had accepted the modified project proposal. The controlling provisions for the assessment of the project under the Environment Protection and Biodiversity Conservation Act 1999 (Cwlth) were unchanged.

On 26 March 2013, the Queensland Coordinator-General released the final Terms of Reference (ToR) for the New Acland Coal Mine Stage 3 Project.

In 2016, the project passed through the Queensland Land Court where it was described as the largest case of its kind.

Environmental approval was granted for Stage 3 in 2019. In 2020, the Oakey Coal Action Alliance appealed to the High Court of Australia.

In August 2022, the Queensland government finally gave approval for the mine's expansion. The expansion extends the mine's life by 12 years to 2034. Mining resumed in September 2023.

== Allegations of breach of environmental law ==
New Acland Mine was caught drilling 27 illegal bores in 2018 and fined $3,152 by the Queensland government.

Documents obtained under Queensland freedom of information laws show the state Department of Environment and Science believed the Darling Downs miner had committed a “major” breach of environmental laws.

A formal “decision memo” detailed that the mine had conducted exploration drilling activities – including drilling at 27 sites and prepping 41 more – on land not designated for mining activity.

In 2020, the federal environment department found no wrong-doing on behalf of the mine. Investigations focused on non-compliance in the areas known as West Pit.

On 22 August 2019, New Acland Thermal coal mine workers were made redundant as the stage 3 deadline approached.

== See also ==
- Coal mining in Australia
