= Dawson Valley Colliery =

Heritage-listed former coal mine

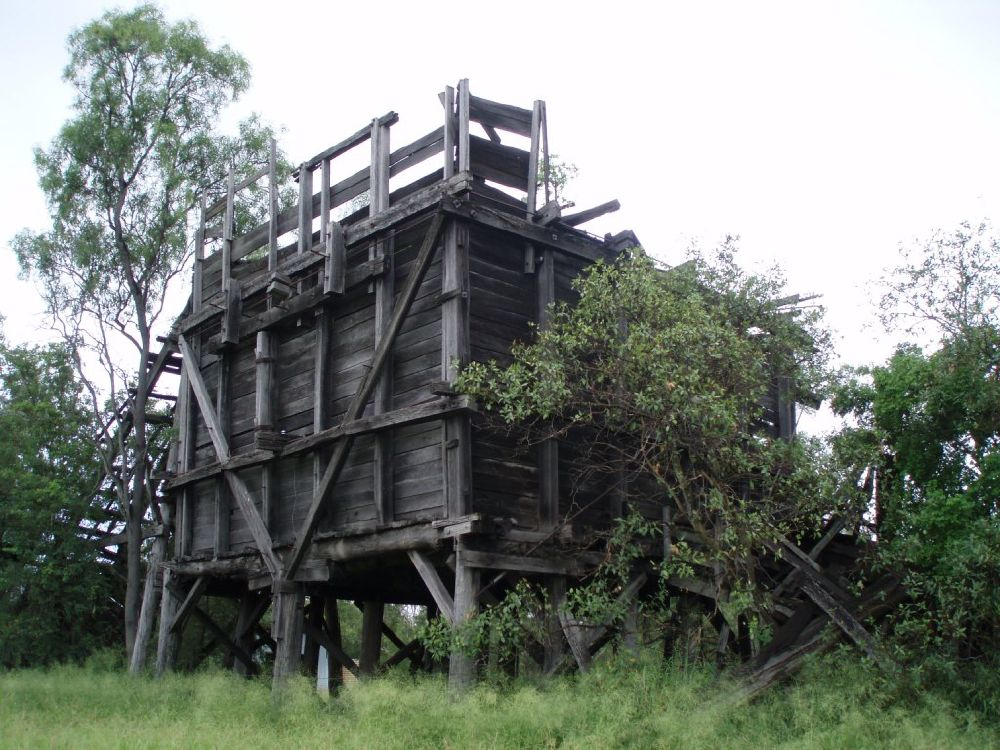
- Coal Bin and Headframe, Dawson Valley Colliery, 2008

- Location within Queensland Location within Australia
- 24.1759°S 149.811°E
- Location: Morgan Street and The Esplanade, Baralaba, Shire of Banana, Queensland, Australia

History
- Design period: 1919 - 1930s (interwar period)
- Built: 1921 -

Queensland Heritage Register
- Official name: Dawson Valley Colliery (former), Baralaba Coal Mine
- Type: state heritage (built)
- Designated: 18 September 2009
- Reference no.: 602723
- Significant period: 1921-1969

Dawson Valley Colliery is a heritage-listed former coal mine at Morgan Street and The Esplanade, Baralaba, Shire of Banana, Queensland, Australia. It was built from 1921 onwards. It is also known as Baralaba Coal Mine. It was added to the Queensland Heritage Register on 18 September 2009.

== History ==
The former Dawson Valley Colliery (established 1921) is located in the Dawson River basin close to the township of Baralaba in Central Queensland. The Dawson River basin forms part of the Bowen Basin coal fields.

The Bowen Basin covers an area about 600 kilometres (370 mi) long and 250 kilometres (160 mi) wide extending from Collinsville in the north to south of Moura in Central Queensland. It contains about 70% of Queensland's coal. These are deposits of the Permian age and are the most important commercial deposits in Queensland, producing almost 100% of the State's coking coal and 60% of its thermal coal. In 2006–2007, Queensland's top ten collieries for production were located in the Bowen Basin.

Coal was first discovered in the Bowen Basin by Ludwig Leichhardt who in 1845 observed coal in the bed of the Mackenzie River. After European settlement of the area in the 1860s, coal was found at Blair Athol, in the north of the Basin, and near the present town of Blackwater. A colliery opened at Bluff in 1905, but struggled to remain viable. Successful commercial exploitation in the Bowen Basin did not begin until the 1920s.

The search for coal in the Dawson River basin began when Benjamin Dunstan, Assistant Government Geologist, was commissioned to search west of the Rannes Range. In 1899 he reported on a coal seam found in the bed of the Dawson on Nulalbin Station and hoped to prove anthracite coal which was favoured for the ships of the Royal Navy. As news of his discovery spread, there was a scramble for licences and by 1901, 63 leases were registered. However, coal samples tested by the Royal Navy were disappointing.

The Queensland Government developed the first coal mine at Baralaba. Development of the mine was dependent on construction of the Dawson Valley railway line, which began into the valley in 1910 and was approaching the river in 1917. The State Coal Mine opened in 1916, supplying coal to the Railway Department of a quality that was increasingly criticised. The flood of 1928 inundated the mine which then closed down.

Mount Morgan Gold Mining Company Limited successfully applied for mining leases at the present mine site. By 1921, under the management of Alexander Campbell, the company was mining the Dunstan Seam and sending coal to the boilers at Mount Morgan mine from three tunnels at the rate of 150 long tons (150 t) a day, with over 90 men employed. The mine temporarily closed in 1929 due to the liquidation of the old Mount Morgan Company, but was re-opened in 1932 by local independent miners working as the Dawson Valley Coal Company on tribute to the new company, Mount Morgan Limited.

Mount Morgan resumed control of operations in 1936, improving ventilation and modernising machinery. The Mine had opened four tunnels into the Dunstan Seam and another, unsuccessfully, into the Dawson Seam. Production from these amounted to 357,838 long tons (363,580 t). This phase of the operation continued until 1944 when working became difficult. Mount Morgan Limited (later its subsidiary Morgan Mining and Industrial Company Pty Ltd) then closed operations in tunnels two, three and four and moved to the new number seven tunnel, continuing operations until 1969.

The extant shaft and many of the surface structures on the site date from the second phase of operations that commenced in 1944 at tunnel seven. The headframe and coal bin were constructed in c. 1944 of local timber, with the exception of the four main timber legs. The main legs were 78 ft-long (24 m) turpentine poles from Fraser Island. A large part of the headframe collapsed in 1993. The workshop, electrical and drill store, and winder house were probably built about the same time as the headframe. The compressor house was added to the winding house probably in c. 1956. The extant screening and crushing plant remains date to the early 1960s.

In addition to mining plant, buildings on the site originally included a manager's residence, electrician's residence, three three-bedroom cottages, single men's quarters and another dwelling. None of these buildings remain extant.

After c. 1946, when the mine was mechanised, mining changed from the bord and pillar system to the breast method. A diesel locomotive and skips transported the coal from the chutes to an underground pocket from where it was hoisted to the surface. In 1968 54 men were employed.

Trial export shipments to Japan and Holland occurred in 1961 and 1962, and production peaked in 1965 at 42,465 long tons (43,146 t), 40% of which was exported. Small amounts were also sent to Malaysia and Thailand. Exports of 20,000 long tons (20,000 t) per annum through the port of Gladstone continued till 1968.

Work ceased at the mine in 1969, with the conversion of the Mount Morgan reverberatory furnace to oil firing, and the development of better situated export coal mines. By June 1968 the three areas worked in the Baralaba district had produced 1,240,440 long tons (1,260,350 t) of coal. Mount Morgan Limited was acquired by Peko-Wallsend in 1968, which closed the colliery on 9 March 1969.

== Description ==
The former Dawson Valley Colliery is located in the southern Bowen Basin, 160 kilometres (99 mi) south-west of Rockhampton and 180 kilometres (110 mi) west of Gladstone. It is situated on the right bank of the Dawson River within the Baralaba town limits. Harcourt and Morgan Streets run into the site.

There are about fourteen structures on the site, many relatively intact and others in a ruined state. There are also a number of moveable items associated with the former mine such as underground locomotives. Timber and corrugated iron are the main building materials. Floors are of concrete, timber and earth. The main extant structures are: the headframe; crushing and screening plant; surface crib room; fan house; winder and compressor house; transformer yard; block making plant; electrical and drill store; workshop; fuel, pipe and electrical detonator sheds; change-house; toilet block; explosives magazine; and detonator magazine.

=== Headframe and shaft ===
This structure comprises a quite intact coal bin with inclined tramway to a shaft covered with mesh. The headframe and the conveyor to the crushing plant and loaders are in ruins to the east of the coal bin.

The coal bin is a large box-like structure with an open top raised on stumps about three metres above the ground. It has exposed studs and bracing with wooden board infill and flooring. Extending from the west of the bin on an incline from the top of the bin to the ground is a tramway supported on a wooden frame. The tramway consists of three steel rails: two are laid quite close together with respect to the third. Towards the top of the tramway, running alongside the rails are the remains of a ladder.

The wreckage of the headframe contains the remains of the tippler mechanism and the rails on which the coal skips ran. These remain relatively intact. At the bottom of the headframe is a long steel "I" beam with sliding winch block used to move coal skips onto and off the underground tramway.

=== Crushing and screening plant ===
This plant consists of three main parts: a separating and crushing plant; and two screening plants with freestanding coal bins.

The separating and crushing plant is located immediately to the north of the headframe. A collapsed conveyor is located between the headframe and this plant. A crusher, made of steel, is mounted in a two level wooden frame with a flat corrugated iron roof. It sits above a hopper constructed of wooden planks. A steel chute at the top of the crusher funnels the coal into two layers of angled vibrating wire screens powered via a belt and an electric motor. From here, oversized coal slides across the top screen into a crushing mechanism and onto a conveyor. The screening and crushing mechanism is intact. An operator's platform and electrical switchgear is intact at the south of the plant.

A damaged conveyor supported on a steel frame made of angle iron starts at the bottom of the crushing plant and slopes upward to end in mid-air above the remains of a screening plant. The belt of the conveyor is missing except for a portion at the upper end. This is draped over a wide pulley wheel at the very end of the conveyor. The pulley wheel is powered via a chain (still extant) and an electric motor mounted on a frame above it.

The first screening plant, which is mostly ruined, comprises a screening mechanism resting on the ground surrounded by, and partly covered with collapsed wooden beams. The screening mechanism consists of a steel bin with a mesh floor, sitting on a base of steel girders. The bin is attached to the base by pivots and coiled steel springs. This enables the bin to be rocked backwards and forwards on its base. A partly collapsed steel framed conveyor leads from this plant to the top of a second screening plant and bin.

The second screening plant consists of a large bin constructed of heavy wooden planks, with a wide, open top tapering to a long, narrow chute at the bottom with two discharge trapdoors. This is supported on a wooden frame. There is a platform on the east side covered by a corrugated iron skillion roof. Steel drive shafts extend from the platform to the trapdoors at the bottom of the chute. A ladder with wooden runners and steel rungs is fixed to the side of the structure reaching to the top. Panels of steel mesh lie on the ground underneath the bin.

=== Surface crib room ===
The surface crib room and stores are located next to the headframe and shaft. It consists of a small, three roomed building, rectangular in plan view, with a wooden frame clad with corrugated iron and rough concrete floors. It has a skillion roof. A space of approximately 0.5 metres (1 ft 8 in) between the north wall and the roof is in-filled with mesh.

Two doors at the south elevation provide access to the two rooms comprising the core of the building; the doors are ledge and brace. Window openings at the south, east and west elevations are covered with hinged corrugated iron flaps. There is a veranda at the north elevation; a portion of this has been enclosed to form a third, small room. A door, clad with corrugated iron, opens through the north wall of this room.

Wooden benches at about waist height line most of the walls of the larger room. Long, low wooden seats are fixed to these. The smaller of the other two rooms has a wooden floor. There are no fixed furnishings in these rooms. An electric copper converted from a 44-imperial-gallon (200 L; 53 US gal) drum is located in an open veranda at the north western corner of the building.

=== Fan house ===
The fan house is located south of the headframe. It mostly consists of a large cylindrical, steel fan housing mounted on concrete plinths. The eastern end of the housing is flared and open; a large multi- bladed fan is visible inside. A smaller, hollow plinth supports this end of the housing; a smaller fan is visible inside. The west end of the housing becomes square in cross-section and tapers to a wedge shape. A larger concrete plinth supports this end of the housing. A small, open ended corrugated iron structure mounted on top of the housing contains an electric motor.

Attached to the south side of the plinth is a small, wood framed shed with a gabled roof; it is clad with corrugated iron. This contains a concrete footing, switchboard, control panel switchboard, and a vacuum gauge.

=== Winder and compressor house ===
The winder and compression house is located approximately 56 metres (184 ft) to the east of the headframe. Overall dimensions are about 16.5 by 8 metres (54 by 26 ft). It consists of two joined, gable roofed sheds of equal size. They have wooden frames and are clad with corrugated iron and asbestos sheeting. The roof lines of both sheds run north to south.

The main entrances into the building are via the north elevation. Two large ledge and brace wooden doors open into the east shed which houses the compressor equipment. A tall rectangular window opens above each of these. To the right of the doors a smaller opening provides access to the west shed which houses the winding equipment. There is a small skillion roofed room, clad with corrugated iron and asbestos sheeting, projecting from the front of the building to the right of this door. Access into this room is via a door at the west end.

A long narrow opening runs the full length of the east elevation. This is covered with steel mesh and shaded by a sloping corrugated iron awning. An air receiver (a long cylinder for holding pressurised gas) is located beside the building next to this elevation. It is about 6 metres (20 ft) long.

There are two windows opening into the south elevation. Both are covered with corrugated iron. A rusted corrugated iron water tank elevated on a wooden stand is located close to the wall of the west half of the elevation.

The west elevation has a large rectangular opening through which the drums of the winders are visible. Some corrugated iron sheeting to the left of this opening is missing. To the right, there is a narrow skillion roofed, corrugated iron extension.

The interior of the shed housing the winding gear contains the double drum winding engine with cable extant on the drums, a platform and controls for the driver, a large electric motor and electrical switch gear including the main circuit breaker for underground. These are all intact. The floor is concrete except where the cable spools are located; here the floor is dirt.

A small annex to this shed contains the air supply for the braking mechanism on the winding engine. It contains an air receiver tank and electric motor.

The compressor shed contains a single cylinder, dual acting compressor powered by an electric motor, a three-cylinder compressor, a large main switchboard and separate switchboards for the main fan and one of the compressors. All are intact. The floor is concrete.

=== Transformer yard ===
Immediately to the south of the winding and compressor house is an enclosed electrical supply yard. The yard is fenced with wooden posts and chain wire mesh with strands of barbed wire near the top. Entry into the yard is via double, steel framed gates with chain wire mesh infill. A small white coloured metal sign on the gate bears the words "Danger 22,000 Volts" in red lettering.

Just inside the gates is a pair of tall wooden posts joined at the top by a steel beam. Beyond this and running down the centre of the yard is a row of four tall wooden posts joined at the top and at mid-height by wooden beams. The two end posts are taller than the rest and have short wooden cross-arms near the top. A single transformer is located at the north east corner of the yard. There are wooden posts around it; these are joined at the top and at mid-height by wooden beams. Electrical insulators are mounted on the uppermost beams.

=== Block making plant ===
This is located just to the east of the winder and compressor house. It is a small skillion roofed, timber-framed structure, about 5 by 7 metres (16 by 23 ft), partially clad with corrugated iron.

The west two-thirds of the structure are open sided. The roof is supported by wooden posts; wooden rails attached with fencing wire to the posts at about quarter height and at half height surround the open area with the exception of a section in the middle of the west side. A small cantilevered skillion extends from half of the west end of the roof. Beneath the skillion is a concrete footing supporting a steel frame made of angle iron; a small electric motor is located next to the east side of the footing under the main roof.

The east third of the structure is enclosed with corrugated iron to form two rooms. The larger west room has wooden shelving on two sides and a concrete floor. It is accessed via a door in the east elevation. The south room, accessed through a door in the south elevation has a concrete floor and is empty. The top third of the west wall of the enclosure, under the skillion roof, is open and in-filled with chain wire mesh.

=== Electrical and drill store ===
This building is located about 40 metres (130 ft) north west of the winder and compressor house. Its overall dimensions are approximately 13 by 6.5 metres (43 by 21 ft). It is a large shed with a wooden frame, gable roof and corrugated iron cladding; the roof line runs east–west. There are door openings at the east and west elevations and window openings along the long, north and south elevations. All window and door openings are shaded by narrow strips of sheet metal, the windows have wooden sills. Many are covered with sheets of corrugated iron. Some are metal framed sash windows; others have no window frames or glazing. Remnants of wooden boards run along the tops of the north and south elevations. The west elevation has an unpainted wooden barge board. There is no guttering on the roof.

Internally the building is divided into three: the electrical store, a central room and the drill and hardware store. The floor is concrete.

The electrical store is located at the western end of the building. It contains only one set of wooden shelves, located at the eastern wall. There is an assortment of electrical parts and equipment scattered on the floor and against the walls.

The larger room at the western end is the drill and hardware store. There are six sets of "pigeon box" shelves fixed to the west, north and east walls. A short wooden wall at right angles to the south wall creates a bay where drill bits and legs for air drills are stored. Some of the shelves are labelled with chalk to indicate the names and sizes of items. Many parts and items of equipment remain extant in this area.

=== Workshop ===
The workshop is located immediately to the north of the electrical and drill store. It is a long wood-framed building measuring about 13.5 by 9 metres (44 by 30 ft) with corrugated iron cladding. The roof has a very low pitch consisting of two skillion roofs that overlap at the apex. There are three door openings along the north elevation and a single door opening at the east elevation. Some sections of sheeting are missing along this side; in some places the gap has been in-filled with steel mesh. Window openings along the south elevation have been covered with sheets of corrugated iron.

The interior encloses a large open space and four small rooms. It contains three workbenches, a drill stand, a shelf with nuts, bolts and spare parts, a lathe bed and an air receiver (about 2.2 by 05 metres (7 ft 3 in by 16 ft 5 in)). A largely intact, Jenbach JW15 underground locomotive and spare locomotive engine are also located in the workshop.

There are four small rooms in the workshop. The plumber's store contains shelves holding assorted plumbing fittings. The hose store contains a few coils of air hose sitting on pallets. The miscellaneous store contains an electric motor, pump impellers and machinery bearing blocks. The fourth room contains rock dust or cement in some 24 bags, a large galvanised iron funnel, bag hooks and unused railway car couplings. This room has an elevated loading platform with a wood board floor.

=== Fuel, pipe and electrical detonator sheds ===
These three sheds are joined to form a single composite structure. All have skillion roofs. They consist of the fuel shed, a wooden framed, corrugated iron shed; the pipe rack storage cage, an open sided structure with a corrugated iron roof; and the detonator store, a small weatherboard shed elevated on short stumps.

The fuel shed is raised on short stumps and has a wooden floor. Access into the shed is via ledge and brace doors in the west elevation. Windows open into the north and south elevations. These are covered with corrugated iron sheeting. Benches are located against two walls in the interior. There is shelving beneath three benches containing various machine parts. Parts are also lying on the floor. Chalk marks on the walls indicate oil types.

The west wall of the pipe rack storage cage is common with the fuel shed. Approximately 30 centimetres (12 in) of the upper section of this wall is not clad and is in-filled with steel mesh. The other three sides have no cladding and are enclosed with steel mesh. Horizontal boards at approximately one-third and two-thirds height are attached to all sides outside the mesh. A steel framed mesh gate provides access through the south elevation. Internally, much of the space is occupied by a steel rack comprising three vertical posts, each with several projecting, flat horizontal prongs.

The detonator store is about 1.8 metres (5 ft 11 in) square and 2.4 metres (7 ft 10 in) high. The door into the shed is located in the south elevation. The interior is lined with sheeting.

=== Change house ===
This building is a long wooden framed gabled roof structure clad in corrugated asbestos sheeting. The walls on all sides are painted in the traditional Mount Morgan tri-colour, light green/pale yellow, a black band and ochre.

Entry into the building is gained through two ledge and brace doors towards the eastern end of the north elevation and a single ledge and brace door at the western end of the south elevation. There are two windows in each elevation. They are wooden framed sash windows with four glazed panels. The windows on the north and south elevation have curved, galvanised iron hoods.

The interior of the building is divided into four rooms, roughly equal in size: lamp room, drying room, shower room and change room. All have concrete floors.

The interior of the lamp room is unlined. It has benches around most of the walls; there are shelves beneath two of these. There is hinged counter that pivots up to close an opening in the wall beneath sash windows.

The interior of the drying room is unlined. A low bench is fitted to the walls and a three sided standing frame with seats and clothes hanging pegs is arranged around a centrally located Metters Jumbo fire heater. All seats have boot racks beneath them. Clothes hanging pegs are fitted to the walls.

The shower room is divided into three parts consisting of a central corridor with communal shower areas on each side. The corridor is separated from the shower areas by elevated partition walls. Five shower heads are extant in each of the shower areas and two hand basins in the corridor.

The change room has a concrete floor and is fully lined with Masonite. There is a low hardwood bench around the interior walls and three evenly spaced standing frames with back to back seats and eight clothes hanging pegs on each side. All seats have boot racks below them. The walls also have clothes hanging pegs.

There are two water tanks on high stands at the eastern elevation. One is raised higher than the other. Another water tank at the west elevation is set on a low stand. A boiler stands some distance from the north of the building. It is connected to the change house by a long length of water pipe, raised more than two metres above the ground.

=== Toilet block ===
The toilet block is located immediately to the east of the change house. It is a small wooden building with a corrugated iron, gabled roof. It consists of two sections: about one third of the eastern part of the building comprises a single room; the rest of the building consists of the lavatory. The building is clad with weatherboard.

There are three entrances into the building. Ledge and brace doors open into the west and east elevations. At the south elevation, there is an opening into a small porch. Two four paned sash windows open into the south and north elevations at the east end. Rows of small, high, frosted glass windows open into the south and north elevations at the lavatory end.

The small porch provides access to a corridor from which access is gained to a room containing a urinal and wash basin and two lavatory cubicles. The doors into the cubicles are ledge and brace. Urinal, pedestals and wash basin are extant. This end of the building is lined with vertical wooden boards.

The small room at the other end of the building is unlined. The room contains a wooden bench, some shelving and a wooden locker. A charging station for the cap light battery packs is lying on its side in a corner at the western end of the room together with broken cap lights and battery packs.

=== The explosives magazine ===
This is located at the northern extremity of the site, about 100 metres (330 ft) north of the main group of colliery buildings. It consists of a small inner weatherboard building with a corrugated iron, gabled roof within a wooden framed outer shed clad with corrugated iron. The outer structure also has a gabled roof. Both structures are elevated on short stumps.

The door into the outer structure is located at one of the end elevations. The word "Explosives" is marked with red letters above the door. The walls at the side elevations and the other end elevation do not reach the roof, leaving a gap of approximately 30 centimetres (12 in). The inner building is lined with vertical wooden boards. It has a ledge and brace door and small square windows into each gable.

=== The detonator magazine ===
This is located a short distance south of the magazine. It is a small wooden framed structure in a ruined state. It is approximately one metre high and one metre on each side. Partly clad with corrugated iron, it had a skillion roof which is no longer extant. A low concrete curb surrounds the structure. A small, partly ruined ledge and brace door is located at the west elevation.

Mine related artefacts extant on the site include two coal skips, a timber skip, two underground locomotives (including the one in the workshop), ore cars, transformer, jinker, air winch, and air receiver. An assortment of tools and parts are located in the electrical and drill store including: drill bits, a jack hammer, block and tackle and various electrical parts and equipment.

The structures and artefacts are in a large site, set in open woodland. Shrubs and small trees are interspersed among the structures. Residences of the Baralaba Township are located close to the east boundary of the site.

== Heritage listing ==
The former Dawson Valley Colliery was listed on the Queensland Heritage Register on 18 September 2009 having satisfied the following criteria.

The place is important in demonstrating the evolution or pattern of Queensland's history.

The Dawson Valley Colliery (1921–1969) is important in demonstrating the evolution of Queensland's coal mining history. As the first successful underground coal mine in the Dawson River Valley and one of the first in the Bowen Basin, it provides important evidence of early commercial coal mining in these areas. The Bowen Basin is Queensland's largest and most productive coal field.

The mine is also important in demonstrating the development of coal mining techniques in Queensland. It is typical, in scale and type, of mines prior to the late 1950s. Underground mines like the Dawson Valley Colliery became less common during the 1960s following the introduction of large-scale open cut methods.

The place demonstrates rare, uncommon or endangered aspects of Queensland's cultural heritage.

The former colliery is one of only two relatively intact former mines known to be extant from the underground phase of coal mining in the Bowen Basin. It is also uncommon in Queensland for its relatively high level of intactness.

The place has potential to yield information that will contribute to an understanding of Queensland's history.

The former colliery is significant for the potential the site has in providing information on underground coal mining and its working conditions and about the use of evolving technology in the coal mining industry in Queensland. As an extensive industrial landscape produced by the shafts, abandoned machinery and structures, the colliery is important as an archaeological site with the potential to yield further information about the layout and use of the mine site.

The place has a special association with the life or work of a particular person, group or organisation of importance in Queensland's history.

The former colliery is associated with Mount Morgan Gold Mining Company Limited and Mount Morgan Limited. The Baralaba mine was initially developed to provide fuel for the boilers and smelters at Mount Morgan Mine, and later produced coal for export. It provides evidence of the scale of operations at Mount Morgan, which was a productive gold and copper mine, and it contributes to knowledge of the company's interests beyond the Mount Morgan mine.

The place is important in demonstrating the principal characteristics of a particular class of cultural places.

The former colliery is important in demonstrating the principal characteristics of the above ground layout and structures of a typical underground coal mine of the mid-twentieth century. Most above ground structures associated with the mine are extant, many of them relatively intact and containing equipment. Structures include: surface crib room; fan house; winder and compressor house; transformer yard; block making plant; electrical and drill store; workshop; fuel, pipe and electrical detonator sheds; change-house; toilet block; explosives magazine; and detonator magazine. The head frame is extant, but partially collapsed. Also extant on the site are a range of artefacts associated with the mine consisting mainly of underground locomotives, coal skips and coal cars. The mine is an excellent example of the mining process and living conditions associated with underground mines of the period.
