= New Hope Group =

Australian coal mining company

- Formerly: New Hope Corporation
- Type: Public
- Traded as: ASX: NHC
- Industry: Resourcess
- Founded: 1952
- Headquarters: Brisbane, Australia
- Area served: Australia
- Key people: Robert Millner (Chairman); Robert Bishop (Chief Executive Officer)
- Products: Bulk Handling; Coal; Exploration
- Revenue: $2.8 billion (2023)
- Net income: $1.6 billion (2023)
- Subsidiaries: New Acland Mine; Queensland Bulk Handling; Bengalla Mine (80%)
- Website: www.newhopegroup.com.au

New Hope Group is an Australian thermal coal-mining company. New Hope's operations include New Acland Mine, Bengalla Mine and Queensland Bulk Handling. It is headquartered in Brisbane, Queensland.

== History ==
New Hope was established in 1952 in Ipswich, Queensland. In the 1970s it was purchased by Soul Patts.

The early 1980s saw the commencement of coal exporting from the Ipswich region, with New Hope being one of the first companies to successfully obtain trials of Ipswich coal into the Japanese market. New Hope's first export shipment, 17,332 tonnes of Bundamba coal, was aboard MV Floret which sailed from the Maynegrain grain terminal at Pinkenba on 10 September 1980. Increasing export coal business dictated the need for a dedicated coal terminal, so a joint venture between New Hope and TNT Shipping and Development was formed to develop a coal loading facility at the Port of Brisbane. Queensland Bulk Handling (QBH) was commissioned at Fisherman Islands in 1983. New Hope has a 50% shareholding in QBH with the balance owned by Patrick Corporation.

In 1984, 13 underground and eight open cut mines were in operation in the Ipswich region. Total production from these mines, which employed just over 1,000 people, was 2.9 million tonnes for the year.

Exports continued to increase to the point where, in 1986, New Hope's market mix had about-faced to 90% export and 10% domestic sales. Despite the district's increase in exports through QBH, which reached 1.6 million tonnes, the reduced requirements for the Swanbank Power Station and cessation of supplies to the Brisbane power stations resulted in a drop in production of close to 12%. Total production from the Ipswich area was 2.8 million tonnes (1.54 from open cut mines and 1.28 from underground operations). Two mines, Westfalen and Box Flat were forced to close due to the termination of their supply agreements with the Swanbank Power Station.

The increase in exports played a major role in restructuring the workforce in the district, with open cut mining being more cost effective to compete on the world market. By the beginning of the 1990s, only 230 underground miners remained employed by the underground mines of MW Haenke No. 2, New Hope Western Leases Nos. 1 and 2 and Oakleigh No. 3. Further decline in the profitability of underground mining meant the closure of the last underground mines in the district by mid-1997, leaving three companies in the Ipswich area operating four open cut pits.

At the end of the twentieth century, the declining export market and Australian dollar increased pressure on the local mining operations, forcing further restructure. All facets of the operations were investigated to find cost-effective solutions. One of the results of this cost-cutting exercise was the cessation of barging coals along the Bremer and Brisbane Rivers with the last barge sailing 30 April 1998. It was the end of an era; coal had been barged to various sites on these rivers, the last of which was QBH at Fisherman Islands, since the 1840s.

To service the New Acland Mine, New Hope Coal financed and constructed a 14 kilometres (8.7 mi) road between Jondaryan and Acland in 2001.

In September 2003, New Hope Corporation was listed on the Australian Securities Exchange. Soul Patts initially retained a 64% shareholding. By 2023 this had been reduced to 39%.

Coal from the New Acland Mine was unable to be transported from the mine via rail after the Western railway line was damaged during the 2010-2011 Queensland floods. Trucks were used instead. By 2011, the company was exporting 65% of its coal, leaving 35% for domestic markets. In 2012, New Hope abandoned plans for its sale after it failed to find a buyer.

On 19 December 2014, the Government of Queensland approved the stage 3 expansion project of the New Acland Mine. This approval was controversial since it was done as one of the last acts before the election season and after records published by the Australian Electoral Commission show New Hope Coal donated $650,000 over the course of the prior three years to the Liberal National Party of Queensland. In February 2015, the federal Minister for the Environment placed the approval on hold amid the controversy.

== Colton mine ==
The company has plans to develop a new mine 8 kilometres (5.0 mi) from Maryborough, called the Colton mine. $200 million was paid to Northern Energy for the mining lease. Environmental concerns has been raised about the mine because it is expected to discharge 985 million litres into the Mary River.

== New Saraji ==
In July 2008, New Hope entered into an agreement to sell its New Saraji Coal Project to BHP Mitsubishi Alliance for $2.45 billion. New Hope has identified more than 690 million tonnes of coal at New Saraji (534 million tonnes inferred and 156 million tonnes indicated) which is near the town of Dysart.

New Hope Chairman Robert Millner said the sale would assist New Hope in expanding its New Acland Mine situated outside Toowoomba, and further development of New Hope's Queensland Bulk Handling port facility in Brisbane. This sale realises substantial value for the New Saraji project. The cash was earmarked to fund growth of the New Acland mine, which has continued to increase production to more than four million tonnes a year with an application to increase production to 10 million tonnes a year.
