= Myuna Colliery =

Coal mine in New South Wales, Australia

- Location within New South Wales
- Location: Wangi Wangi, New South Wales, Australia; 33°03′49″S 151°34′09″E
- Products: Coal
- Opened: August 1979; 47 years ago
- Company: Centennial Coal

Myuna Colliery is a coal mine at Wangi Wangi, New South Wales, Australia. The colliery was developed to provide coal for the Eraring Power Station, 5 kilometres to the west. The mine started in August 1979, with coal production commencing in 1982. The Wallarah, Great Northern and Fassifern coal seams have been mined using bord and pillar mining methods. Coal is transported to the Eraring Power Station by an overland conveyor system.
