= Westside Mine =

Former coal mine in New South Wales, Australia

- Location in New South Wales
- Location: Wakefield, New South Wales, Australia; 32°56′56″S 151°34′20″E
- Products: Coal
- Opened: 1992
- Closed: 2012
- Company: Xstrata (80%); Marubeni (17%); JFE Minerals (3%)
- Website: Official website

Westside Mine is a former coal mine in Wakefield, New South Wales, Australia. The open cut mine was developed to provide coal for the Eraring Power Station. The mine opened in 1992 and closed in February 2012 due to exhaustion of mineable reserves.

Former owners include FAI Mining, HIH Insurance, Glencore and Enex.

Rehabilitation of the site was completed in 2022. The mine area has been reshaped to remove any high walls and covered with topsoil and seeded with native vegetation. During the last nine years of the mine's life, it was operated under contract by Thiess and was the most productive mine in the Hunter Valley measured by production tonnes per team member. The rehabilitated mine site has second generation flora and seven threatened species of wildlife have been observed.
