= Wangan =

Wangan may refer to:

- Wangan-sen, or Bayshore Route, a stretch of toll highway in Greater Tokyo, noted for street racing
- Wangan Midnight, Japanese anime/manga/video game series
- Isewangan Expressway in Ise, Japan
- Wangan, Penghu, township in Penghu County (the Pescadores), Taiwan centered around Wangan Island
- Wangan, Queensland, a town in Queensland, Australia
- Wangan people, an ethnic group of Queensland, Australia
- Barangay Wangan, Calinan District, in Davao City, Philippines
