= Abbot Point =

Deepwater port in Queensland, Australia

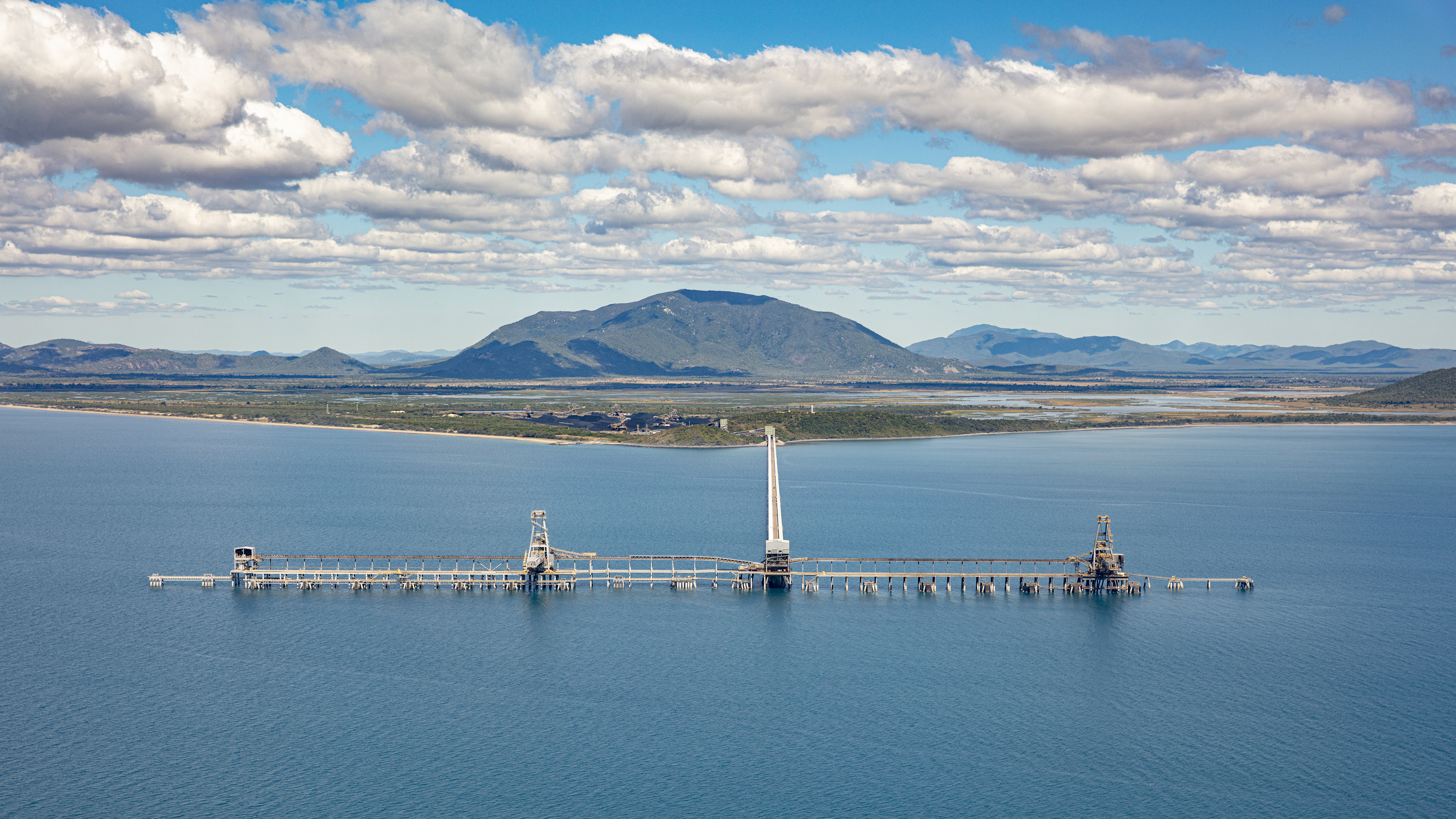
- Abbott Point port infrastructure from the sea, 2018
- Interactive map of Abbot Point
- Location within Australia

Location
- Country: Australia
- Location: 25 km (16 mi) north of Bowen
- Coordinates: 19°52′59″S 148°04′59″E
- UN/LOCODE: AUABP

Details
- Operated by: Adani Group
- Owned by: North Queensland Bulk Ports
- Type of Harbor: Naturally deep-water coal export port
- No. of berths: 2
- Draft depth: 19.1 m.

Statistics
- Vessel arrivals: 190 (2010-11)
- Annual cargo tonnage: 15,063,943 (2010-11)
- Website www.nqbp.com.au

The Port of Abbot Point is home to the North Queensland Export Terminal (NQXT), the most northerly deepwater coal port of Australia, situated approximately 25 kilometres (16 mi) north-west of the town of Bowen, Whitsunday Region, Queensland. Established in 1984, it consists of a rail in-loading facility, coal handling and stockpile areas, and a single trestle jetty and conveyor connected to a berth and shiploader, located 2.75 km off-shore. Coal reaches the port via the GAP line from the Bowen Basin Coalfields.

The Port of Abbot Point is of significant strategic value to North Queensland Bulk Ports Corporation, as there are very few locations along Queensland's eastern seaboard where deep water (>15m) is so close in-shore. North Queensland Export Terminal has been operating for 35 years exporting coal.

== Terminal 1 ==
Adani Ports signed a 99-year lease on Abbot Point Terminal 1 in 2011. The deal cost Adani Group $1.83 billion.

Abbot Point Operations been contracted by North Queensland Export Terminal to manage the operations at the port of Abbot Point.

== Expansion ==
The port is planned to provide export facilities for coal mined from the Galilee Basin. The terminal has approvals to be expanded with the addition of a second wharf and shiploader as well as an additional onshore stockyard and machines, however this was tabled due to the sizing down of the Carmichael Mine. The road and railway to the port have been targeted at times by non-violent direct action by environmentalists opposed to coal exports.

An environmental assessment which included a review of 16 environmental studies, found the port's expansion would not have a significant impact on the Great Barrier Reef and that Greenpeace's claims regarding the expansion's impact were overstated. The Great Barrier Reef Marine Park Protection Authority (GBRMPA) advised minister Greg Hunt not to approve dredging for the Abbott Point coal port expansion. The Environment Protection and Biodiversity Conservation Act was amended so that government does not have to consider expert advice before approving major developments such as mines and ports.

=== GVK-Hancock Coal ===
Federal approval for the port to be used by Hancock Coal to export coal from the Alpha Coal Project was granted on 10 October 2012. Conditions for the go-ahead included a seagrass offset scheme, a wetland management plan, funding for Indigenous rangers, monitoring of air and water quality, amongst a total of 60 conditions aimed primarily to protect the Great Barrier Reef. For every 1 hectare (2.5 acres) of seagrass impacted by the port expansion, 8 hectares (20 acres) must be protected.

== Bowen Orbital Spaceport ==
In May 2021, it was announced that private Australian rocket launch company Gilmour Space Technologies was given the go-ahead by the Queensland Government to build a rocket launch facility in Abbot Point. The company's rocket, Eris, lifted off for the first time on the 29 May 2025, with the mission ending in failure after 14 seconds of flight time.

== See also ==
- Economy of Queensland
- List of ports in Australia
