= G. V. K. Reddy =

Indian businessman

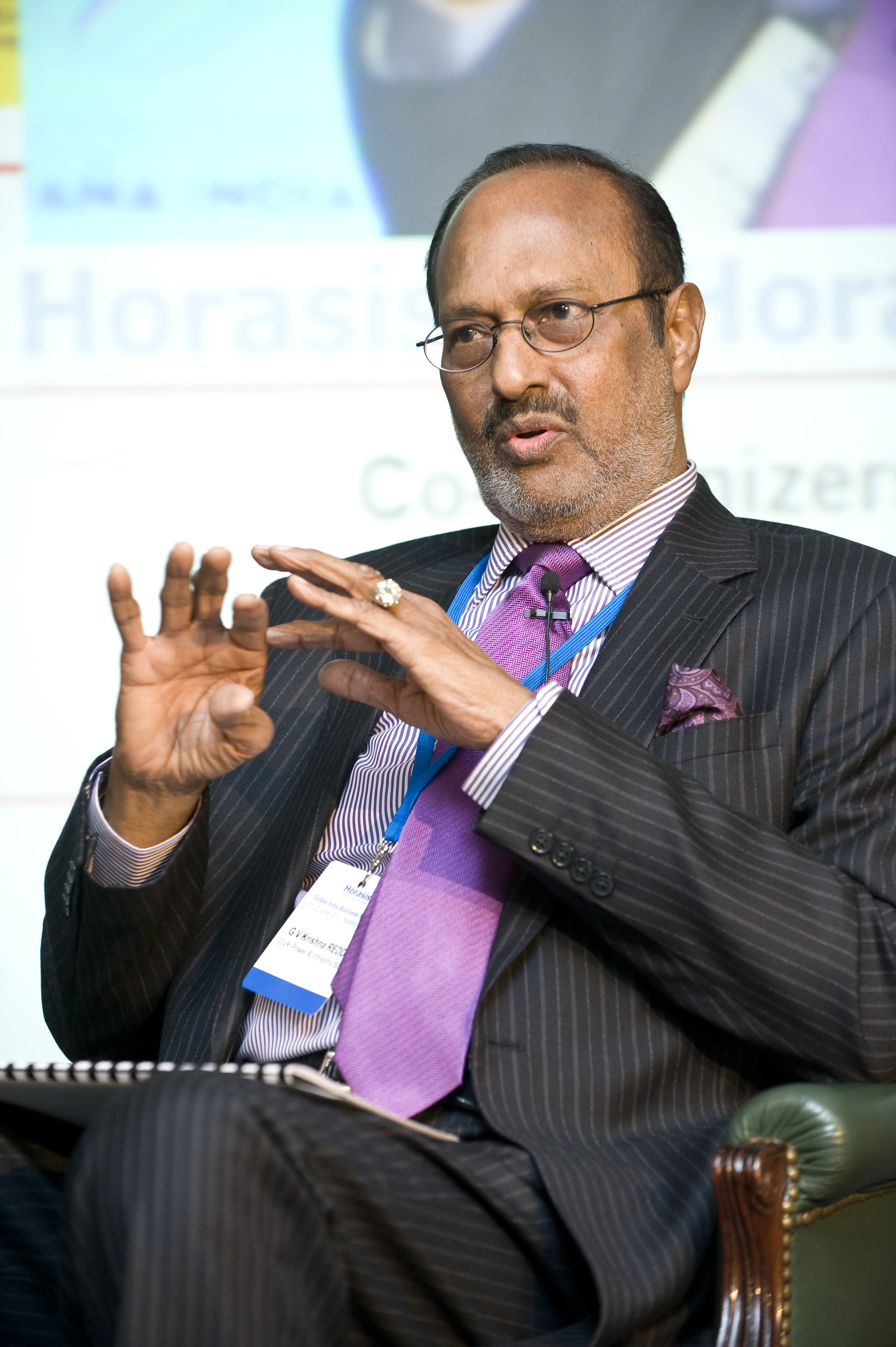
- G. V. K. Reddy at Horasis Global India Business Meeting, 2010.
- Born: Gunupati Venkata Krishna Reddy; 22 March 1937 (age 89); Kothur, Madras Presidency, British India
- Occupations: Founder, Chairman & MD of GVK Group
- Spouse: Indira Reddy
- Children: Shalini Bhupal, G. V. Sanjay Reddy
- Awards: Padma Bhushan (2010)
- Website: gvkrishnareddy.com

Gunupati Venkata Krishna Reddy (born 22 March 1937) is a philanthropist and entrepreneur. He is the founder and chairman of the GVK Group, a business conglomerate with a predominant focus on infrastructure development.

Reddy also heads GVK EMRI, the corporate social responsibility initiatives of the GVK Group. This is an emergency response services provider under a Public-Private Partnership model spread across 15 states and two Union Territories of India. In 2009, he was elected as the Chairman of 108 Ambulance for Andhra Pradesh.

== Early life and education ==
G. V. K. Reddy was born on 22 March 1937 in a Telugu family in Kothur Village of Nellore District in Andhra Pradesh. Reddy did his basic schooling from his village, early college from Nellore and graduated from Hyderabad. He later completed the Owner/President Management (OPM) Program from Harvard Business School, USA. GV Krishna Reddy is married to Indira Reddy, and has a daughter, Shalini Bhupal, and a son GV Sanjay Reddy.

== Career ==
Reddy began his career at the age of 21 by taking over his family construction business. The starting business was contracting major irrigation projects including bridges, dams, and irrigation canals. His first project included construction of a canal and under the tunnel at Nagarjuna Sagar Right Canal at Adigoppula and Chamarajapuram. Apart from airports, roads, and power, the GVK Group has a presence in the hospitality and life sciences sectors.

In 1990, the GVK Group won the contract to build the Jegurupadu Combined Cycle Power Plant in Andhra Pradesh, which was commissioned in 1997. This was important for the company at the time because before then the biggest project they had handled was a hospitality project in Hyderabad.

== Philanthropy ==
The philanthropic focus of Reddy is driven by the GVK Foundation which formed to serve the underprivileged. The various endeavors of this foundation now extends to urban improvement initiatives and promoting sports talent, particularly in tennis.

As the President of the All India Senior Tennis Association and a player himself, Reddy has sponsored, through the GVK Group, young tennis players including Sania Mirza and Pranjala Yadlapalli, as part of a push to produce a world leading player from India.

Under his leadership, the GVK Group has focused on environment preservation with the setting up of Deer Park which is spread over 6 hectares at the Jegurupada Power Plant and Botanical Gardens in Mumbai. The group has also adapted environment friendly practices in its constructed plants such as Jegurupada Power Plant, Goindwal Sahib Thermal Power Project, Punjab and waste management in airports.

GVK-EMRI's hospital offered free covid treatment after becoming operational on 7 June 2021. GVK Reddy contributed Rs 1 crore for the construction of Ram Mandir.

== Awards and honours ==
- Felicitated by the Turf Authorities of India (TAI) for the lead role played by GVK in India's infrastructure development at the TAI Awards 2019.
- 'Lifetime Achievement Award' at the 'Realty Plus Conclave & Excellence Awards- South 2017'.
- "Lifetime Achievement Award" at the Construction Times Annual Awards, 2017.
- "Lifetime Achievement Award" at the Construction Week India Annual Awards, 2017.
- "Lifetime Achievement Award" at the 6th EPC World Awards, 2017 for a contribution toward infrastructure and construction sectors.
- 'Padma Bhushan' award in 2011 by then President Pratibha Patil and Prime Minister Manmohan Singh.
- 'Entrepreneur of the year' at ET Awards in 2008–09.

== See also ==
- GVK Industries
