= Galilee Basin =

Sedimentary basin in Queensland, Australia

Coordinates: 22°00′S 146°00′E

The Galilee Basin is a large inland geological basin in the western Queensland region of Australia. The Galilee Basin is part of a larger Carboniferous to Mid-Triassic basin system that contains the Cooper Basin, situated towards the south-west of the Galilee Basin, and the Bowen Basin to the east. The Galilee Basin covers a total area of approximately 247,000 square kilometres (95,000 sq mi). The basin is underlain by the Carboniferous Drummond Basin and overlain by the Cretaceous – Jurassic Eromanga Basin. The Triassic and younger sediments of the Galilee Basin form the basal sequence of the Great Artesian Basin drainage basin.

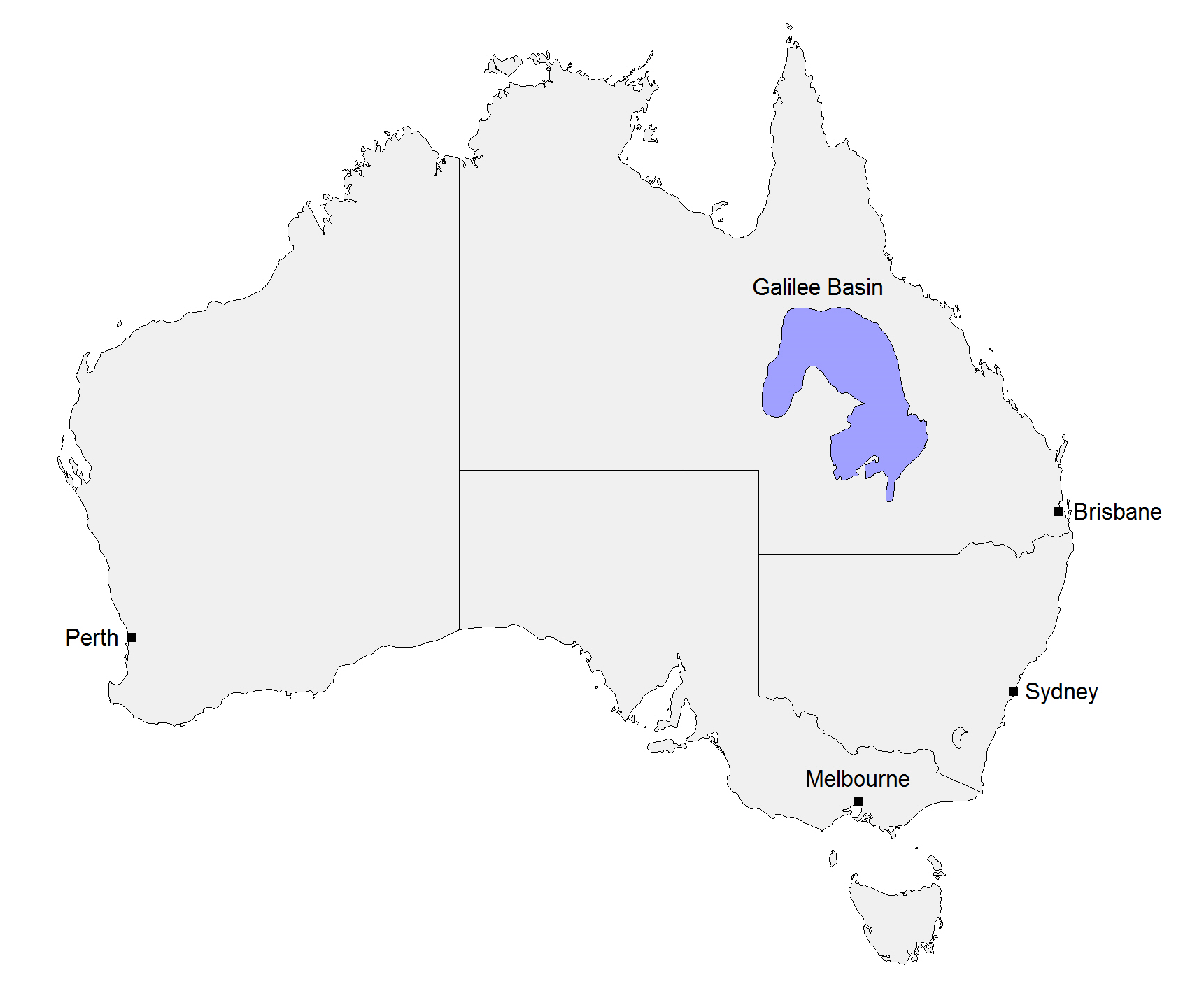
Location of the Galilee Basin

== Physical geography ==
The Galilee Basin spans elements of the upper Lake Eyre drainage catchment, Bulloo river basin and Murray–Darling Basin and the adjacent eastern highlands. The basin also extends into the upper coastward Burdekin river basin and Fitzroy river basin to the north-east and east and the Gulf of Carpentaria to the north-west. This geographic complexity ensures that the Galilee Basin spans a number of physiographic regions with a relatively complex pattern in the eastern highlands and headwaters. Lake Buchanan and Lake Galilee within the Galilee Basin are classified as inland wetlands, with Lake Buchanan described as both a seasonal/intermittent saline lake and a seasonal saline marsh and Lake Galilee also as a seasonal/intermittent saline lake and as a seasonal/intermittent freshwater pond and marsh.

The climate of the Galilee Basin is generally hot and dry throughout, becoming more extreme towards the west. Monthly mean temperatures show daytime summer temperatures are mostly in the mid-30s °C with winter overnight temperatures most commonly between 5 and 12 °C. The temperature records from the past 36 years shows values ranging from −2 °C to 44 °C. ‘Hot days’, with temperatures exceeding 35 °C, can be expected up to 74 to 101 days per year. ‘Frost days’ with screen temperatures below 2 °C can be expected up to 1.4 to 10.4 days per year. Relative humidity is highest in the mornings and during February, while the lowest is in the mid to late spring mornings and afternoons. The annual rainfall within the Galilee Basin ranges between 150 mm and 1,477 mm, with an average rainfall of between 492 mm and 610 mm depending on location. Rainfall in December through March accounts for approximately 65 per cent of annual mean rainfall. The wettest month on average is January and the driest month is May.

== Human geography ==
The Galilee Basin covers 14 local government areas; Barcaldine; Barcoo; Blackall-Tambo; Central Highlands; Charters Towers; Diamantina; Flinders; Longreach; Maranoa; McKinlay; Murweh; Quilpie; Richmond & Winton, with none entirely included within the Galilee Basin. The basin spans parts of nine planning regions and five natural resource management regions. The Galilee Basin overlies the mining districts of Charters Towers; Dalby; Emerald; Mount Isa; Quilpie & Winton. The Galilee Basin overlies all three Queensland Mining Regions "northern, central and southern". Pastoral grazing is by far the most frequent land use (greater than 95%) and conservation reserves occupy around 3%. Wetlands of national significance occupy 0.3% of the area of the Galilee subregion, and riverine floodplains that are also potentially water dependent occupy a further 15.5% of the area. Most of the Galilee Basin is within the Desert Channels natural resource management (NRM) region. In the 2011 census there were less than 20,000 residents in the Galilee Basin region (<12 people per 1 km^{2}). The estimated residential population of the Galilee Basin region has decreased by −0.7% from 2001 to 2015. Rural towns and their respective populations within the Galilee Basin is provided Table 1.

Galilee Basin township populations
Township	Population
Adavale	141
Alpha	571
Aramac	299
Augathella	395
Barcaldine	1,655
Blackall	1,588
Charleville	3,728
Hughenden	2,152
Jericho	369
Middleton	121
Muttaburra	106
Richmond	522
Tambo	345
Torrens Creek	64
Total	12,056

The indigenous heritage of the Galilee Basin is complex, with at least 12 Indigenous tribal or language groups in four separate language regions—Eyre, Gulf, Northeast and Riverine. There are native title claims covering large portions of the basin and a number of Indigenous Land Use Agreements in place.

The major economic activities in the Galilee Basin are primary production (mostly rangeland grazing), government services, retail, education and tourist-related activities. The dominant occupation (32.5%) is in the agriculture, forestry and fishing category. With limited forestry restricted to the south-eastern corner and no coastal connection for fishery, this category is dominated by sheep and beef production. The second highest occupation is government services, which includes local government and health and social service care (19.8%). This is followed by five categories including retail trade; construction; education and training (schools mostly); transport, postal and warehousing; and accommodation and food services, which all provide significant employment (5 to 8%) in the Galilee Basin. Currently mining is a low-level occupation category within the subregion at 1.3% but this may increase during the constructional and/or operational phases of projected coal mining and coal seam gas extraction developments, with possible impacts on other employment categories.

== Ecology ==
The Galilee Basin has a diversity of ecological communities and species as a consequence of the interactions between its large area, several biologically significant climatic gradients, the biogeographic effects of eight river basins, and the importance of landscape form driving water and soil redistribution in semi-arid environments of inland Australia. This diversity is expressed through the presence of 31 subregions of the Interim Biogeographic Regionalisation for Australia and 46 major vegetation subgroups of the National Vegetation Information System.

The most common terrestrial vegetation NVIS subgroups are (i) Mitchell grass (Astrebla) tussock grasslands, (ii) Eucalyptus open woodlands with a grassy understorey, and (iii) cleared, non-native vegetation. Other vegetation subgroups occur with lower frequency and form a complex mosaic that gradually changes from north-east to south-west across the Galilee Basin. The woody components of these vegetation types have been subject to clearance over 16% of the Galilee Basin, mainly to the east, with the aim of improving pasture productivity. The annual rate of clearance has declined since 2005. Pasture components are reported to have stable condition, except for a recent decline in the north-east corner.

As rivers and streams are all intermittent, the durations of flow and non-flow periods, and the depth of water, together determine the number of species locally per unit area and degree of species sharing amongst rivers and residual waterholes. The ecology of rockholes (shallow depressions that collect local rainwater) and outcrop springs (springs of water that has percolated through rock layers in the immediately surrounding area) is poorly studied, as is the ecology of the species that occur within aquifers below ground level (stygobiota). However, discharge springs (springs of water that had percolated through rock layers over long distances and from which water emanates under pressure) are better studied, and numerous locally endemic species of plant, mollusc and fish have been identified. The ecology of both discharge springs and stygobiota is understood to depend on relatively stable water regimes, compared with the highly intermittent character of other aquatic habitats in the region. As a result of water drawdown for agriculture, discharge springs have been subject to significant degradation over the last century. Only 36% of the 300 springs complexes (local clusters of springs) identified in the Great Artesian Basin in 1900 are still active. There are no data on impacts of agricultural drawdown on stygobiota. Discharge springs have also been subject to invasion by exotic plants and disturbance by sheep, pigs, horses and donkeys. Riverbanks and waterholes are generally assessed to be in better condition.

== Surface water and groundwater ==
The Galilee Basin straddles the Great Dividing Range and encompasses the headwaters of seven major river basins. The Thompson river and Barcoo river of the Cooper Creek system, the Diamantina River, the Flinders River in the north-west, the Bulloo River in the south, and the Warrego River in the south-east. The subregion also extends across the Great Dividing Range to the east and north-east into the headwaters of the Fitzroy river basin and Burdekin river basin. It also includes two nationally important wetlands, Lake Buchanan and Lake Galilee.

The Galilee Basin includes aquifers that are a part of the Great Artesian Basin. These large aquifers are utilised as a water supply across much the Galilee subregion and importantly form a significant part of the recharge zone. Some groundwater may also discharge to surface as springs or where hydrogeological conditions are favourable, discharge to major rivers. Water extraction and water budgets are detailed in the Great Artesian Water Resource Plan (2006), covering most of the Galilee subregion. This plan is unique in that it only applies to artesian water and connected sub-artesian water of the Great Artesian Basin, and does not include management plans for surface water.

== Geology ==
There are numerous suggestions of the origin of the Galilee Basin. Vine (1976) proposed downwarping, however Evans (1980) have suggested pull-apart basin related to shearing. Jackson et al. (1981) has suggested the basin was created from the reactivation of basement faults and downwarping. De Caritat & Braun (1982) proposed Late Carboniferous compressional upthrust of the Anakie Inlier, creating a flexural topographic depression, followed in the Late Permian – Mid-Triassic by subduction of the oceanic plate to the east, which initiated the later development of the basin. Waschbusch et al. (2009) suggested the basin formed as a response to platform tilting caused by mantle corner flow. A review from Stewart (2011) identified an additional theory that the Galilee Basin began when crustal extension (Jericho and Denison events) during the Late Carboniferous – Early Permian reactivated older faults from underlying basins. According to I'Anson et al. (2017), total subsidence of ~2 km from the Carboniferous to the Late Cretaceous in the Galilee Basin was punctuated by two major exhumation events in the Triassic and Cretaceous.

Sedimentation was initially restricted to fluvial sandstone, but later expanded to other depocentres during deposition of fluvial and lacustrine sediments. Tuff and volcanolithic sandstone were deposited during the Early Permian (Jochmus Fm), and was followed by east–west contraction (Cattle Creek Event) that produced the Mid-Permian unconformity across the basin. Thermal subsidence (Aldebaran and Bellata events) in the Late Permian – Early Triassic generated widespread continental siliciclastics with coal and some marine sandstone across the basin. Subsequent uplift (Clematis Event) produced a wide spread Lower Triassic unconformity and was followed by fluvial quartz-rich sandstone, then lacustrine and fluvial mudstone, siltstone, and sandstone comprising the basal sequence of the Great Artesian Basin. Sedimentation ended during the Mid Triassic Hunter-Bowen Orogeny (Showgrounds and Goondiwindi events). Compression during the Late Cretaceous – Oligocene formed antiforms over faults in the basin.

== Geological structures & depocentres ==
The Nebine Ridge and Springsure Shelf are structural highs that separate the Galilee Basin from the Bowen Basin to the south east. The Canaway Ridge separates the Galilee Basin from the Cooper Basin to the south west. The Galilee Basin contains up to 3000m of siliciclastics, coal, diamictite and tuffaceous units. The basin has three main depocentres: Lovelle Depression (>730 m of Early Permian – Middle Triassic) in NW; Koburra Trough (>2800 m of Late Carboniferous – Middle Triassic strata) in NE; and Powell Depression (>1700 m of Early Permian – Middle Triassic strata) in the south.

== Stratigraphy ==
The geological units within the Galilee Basin are outlined below. A stratigraphic section of the northern, eastern and southern regions of the Galilee Basin is provided within "the Hydrostratigraphic sequence of the Cenozoic, the Eromanga Basin and Galilee Basin".

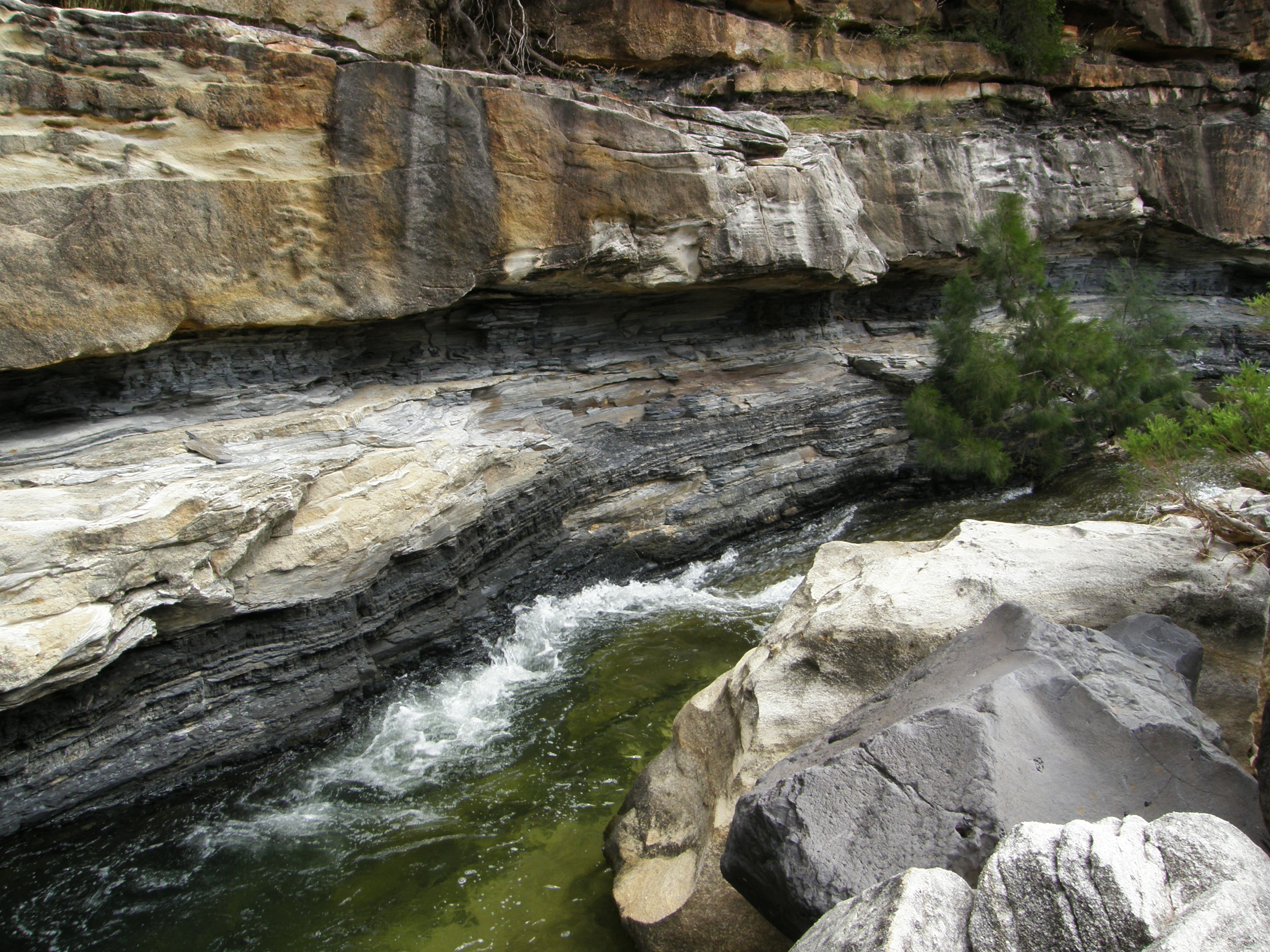
Coal seams of the Betts Creek Beds

Galilee Basin geological units
Geological Unit	Age
Lake Galilee Sandstone	Late Carboniferous
Jericho Formation	Late Carboniferous
Jochmus Formation	Early Permian
Boonderoo beds	Early Permian
Aramac Coal Measures	Early Permian
Weston beds	Permian
Colinlea Sandstone	Late Permian
Betts Creek beds	Late Permian
Peawaddy Formation	Late Permian
Black Alley Shale	Late Permian
Bandanna Formation	Late Permian
Rewan Formation	Early Triassic – Middle Triassic
Dunda beds	Early Triassic – Middle Triassic
Clematis Group	Early Triassic – Middle Triassic
Warang Sandstone	Early Triassic – Middle Triassic
Moolayember Formation	Middle Triassic

== Economic geology ==
The Galilee Basin contains deposits of thermal coal and has been described as Australia's newest mining province. There are currently no operating coal mines in the Galilee Basin. Bravus Mining & Resources is expected to start production of thermal coal in late 2021. Exploration of coal seam gas, conventional oil and tight oil and shale gas resources is also being conducted. In 1981, the Queensland Department of Mines estimated that demonstrated resources reached 800 million tonnes near Alpha alone. In 2008, Waratah Coal announced the discovery of 4,400 million tonnes of coal in the basin. Geoscience Australia reports 15 mineral deposits within the Galilee Basin which include; Kevins Corner, Pentland, Alpha (Hancock), Alpha North, South Alpha, Galilee (Liberty), South Galilee, Carmichael, Pentland (United), Hughenden, White Mountain (Clyde Park), Yellow Jacket, South Pentland, Milray, Hyde Park Coal Project.

=== Unconventional gas ===
Exploration for coal seam gas is in early stages, and targets the thick coal seams of the Permian Betts Creek Beds, with a secondary target being the Aramac Coal Measures. Coal seam gas was generated by thermogenic processes when maximum burial depths of ~2 km were achieved in the Late Cretaceous as well as secondary biogenic gas generation following uplift. The challenges to a viable gas project in the Galilee Basin include low gas saturations, distance to market and large volumes of produced water.

=== Current mining ===
The Galilee Basin has 48 currently granted mining leases, comprising a total area of 19.30 square kilometres (7.45 sq mi). All current mining leases within the basin are associated with small-scale mining operations for barite, bentonite, calcite, gypsum; limestone, opals; phosphate and potassium. The Galilee Basin has an active petroleum production lease ‘PL65’ held by Australian Gasfields Ltd. The Galilee Basin has 183 active quarry operations that have a combined area of 94 square kilometres.

=== Future mining ===
Large deposits of Permian thermal coal (Betts Creek Beds & Colinlea Sandstone) outcrop on the eastern margin of the Galilee Basin. The coals are classified as high-volatile sub-bituminous to bituminous. Currently there are no coal mines in production. Coal mining leases and coal mining lease applications within the Galilee Basin are included in Table 3. The proposed coal mining leases have a combined footprint of approximately 1.38% of the entire Galilee Basin, dominantly encompassing underground mining opportunities. Coal mining leases within the Galilee Basin have near term open-cut and long-term underground resources. The Galilee Basin also has some limited potential for future development of coal seam gas resources.

=== Coal mining leases ===
Coal mining leases and coal mining lease applications within the Galilee Basin

Galilee Basin coal mining leases & mining applications
Authorised Holder Name	Permit Name	Permit Number	Size km^{2}	Status
ADANI MINING PTY LTD	CARMICHAEL	ML 70441	260	Granted
ADANI MINING PTY LTD	CARMICHAEL EAST	ML 70505	135	Granted
ADANI MINING PTY LTD	CARMICHAEL NORTH	ML 70506	16	Granted
ALPHA COAL PTY LTD	SOUTH GALILEE COAL PROJECT	ML 70453	309	Application
HANCOCK COAL PTY LTD	ALPHA	ML 70426	324	Application
HANCOCK GALILEE PTY LTD	KEVIN'S CORNER	ML 70425	374	Application
MACMINES AUSTASIA PTY LTD	PCS EAST	ML 70514	49	Application
MACMINES AUSTASIA PTY LTD	PCS SOUTH	ML 70515	47	Application
MACMINES AUSTASIA PTY LTD	PCS WEST	ML 70516	47	Application
MACMINES AUSTASIA PTY LTD	PCS CENTRAL	ML 70517	32	Application
MACMINES AUSTASIA PTY LTD	PCS NORTH	ML 70518	26	Application
WARATAH COAL PTY LTD	NORTH ALPHA MINING LEASE	ML 70489	1048	Application
WARATAH COAL PTY LTD	CHINA FIRST COAL PROJECT	ML 70454	756	Application

=== Carmichael coal mine ===
The most advanced proposal is Bravus Mining and Resource's Carmichael coal mine. In July 2014, Greg Hunt, the Australian Minister for Environment approved Adani's proposal for the Carmichael coal mine and its associated rail link to the coast. The A$16.5 billion project was expected initially to create the largest coal mine in Australia and one of the largest in the world, however was scaled back significantly to just 10mtpa.

Financial analysts doubted the project was viable but the company self-financed the $2bn project in 2018. It struck first coal in June 2021 and is expected to start production at the end of the year.

=== Other projects ===
In May 2012, the Government of Queensland granted approval to Hancock Coal and GVK to construct the Alpha Coal Project. The mine is intended to export 30 million tonnes of thermal coal annually from 2015. One thousand employees will be needed once the mine is operational.

Hancock is also hoping to develop the Kevin's Corner coal mine adjacent to the Alpha project.

Mineralogy, controlled by Clive Palmer, owns thermal coal deposits in the Galilee Basin, which he claims amounts to around 100 billion tonnes of coal. However, this amount of coal resource is not substantiated by official figures. Palmer's proposed China First mine which is owned by Waratah Coal, would result in the destruction of Bimblebox Nature Refuge, which is part of Australia's National Reserve System and is listed as a conservation area of State Significance in Queensland. The reserve is co-owned local landowner Paola Cassoni who is adamant the endangered black-throated finch must be protected. In 2022 Queensland land court President Fleur Kingham ruled that the project should not go ahead because of its impact on climate change, its broader environmental effects, and its erosion of human rights. This was in response to a case brought by a First Nations-led group called Youth Verdict.

The mine is expected to export 40 million tonnes of coal a year and according to Palmer will proceed even though one of the original supporters, Vitol, has left the project. China First Coal includes an open-cut, underground longwall mine, standard gauge railway and port facility.

== Coal quality ==
Galilee Basin coal quality indicates a premium-quality low sulphur and low ash thermal washed product. Further highlights of the coal quality include high ash fusion temperature, coupled with the low chlorine which reduces the slagging potential of the ash, whilst the excellent fuel ratios allows for efficient combustion and low carbon in ash. Galilee Basin coals are substantially lower in trace elements when compared to domestic and international averages. Analysis of the CO_{2} emissions indicates a competitive product when compared against international benchmarks, producing 1.1 tonnes of CO_{2} per Megawatt hour of electricity generated. This is on a par with some other high-rank Australian and South African coals.

Coal produced from the Carmichael coal mine is high quality thermal coal, with a weighted average value of 4,301–4,600 kcal/kg. It is more efficient than typical Indian or Indonesian coal. Its product specification is 5600Kcal and 11% ash.

Galilee Basin Late Permian coal quality
Coal Quality	Alpha	Kevin's Corner	South Galilee Coal Project	Hyde Park Coal Project
Total Moisture (% ar)	17	17	16	14.5
Inherent Moisture (% ad)	8	8.8	8.9	7.8
Ash (% ad)	9.5	10.6	13	11
Volatile Matter (% ad)	33.4	33.3	34	29.5
Total Sulphur (% ad)	0.56	0.5	0.9	0.3
Fuel Ratio	1.45	1.42	1.37	1.76
Calorific Value (kcal/kg) (gar)	5800	5790	5615	5900
Hardgrove Grindability Index	52	49	45	58

Note: ar – as received; ad – air dried; gar – gross as received

== Infrastructure ==
=== Galilee Basin State Development Area ===
Initiation of coal mining within the Galilee Basin requires substantial capital expenditure on rail and port expansion. The Queensland Government declared the Galilee Basin State Development Area (SDA) in June 2014, supporting the development of the Galilee Basin in providing a robust statutory framework for development of linear infrastructure to the Port of Abbot Point. The Galilee Basin SDA will enable a coordinated approach to developing a multi-user common rail corridor whilst minimising impacts on landholders and the environment. The SDA supports development both to the central and southern Galilee Basin.

=== Abbot Point coal terminal ===
Port facilities at Abbot Point are expected to be the export point for coal sourced from the Galilee Basin. The Abbot Point Port includes the North Queensland Export Terminal, the most northerly deep-water coal port of Australia, situated approximately 25 kilometres (16 mi) north-west of the township of Bowen (Queensland). North Queensland Export Terminal has been operating for 35 years, safely, responsibly and efficiently exporting coal, however the port's location has been considered controversial as it is so close to the Great Barrier Reef, a UNESCO world heritage site.

=== Other infrastructure ===
A proposal for a coal-fired power station in the area has been placed on hold. Water supply for mines in the basin was once provided as a reason supporting the development of the Bradfield Scheme.

== Paleontology ==
In the south-east of the basin lies the Rewan Formation. Small assemblages of the tetrapod species, Lydekkerina from the Lootsbergian age, have been found.

== See also ==
- Geology of Queensland
- Mining in Australia
- Carmichael coal mine
