= Murrawah Maroochy Johnson =

Australian climate activist

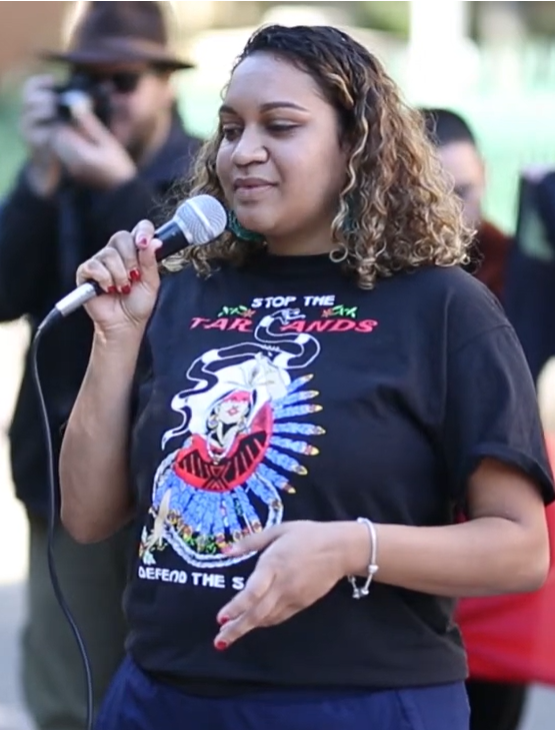
- Johnson in 2018
- Born: Queensland, Australia
- Occupation: Climate activist
- Organization(s): Co-Director, Youth Verdict
- Relatives: Adrian Burragubba
- Awards: Goldman Environmental Prize 2024

Murrawah Maroochy Johnson is a Wirdi climate activist best known for her role as Co-Director of Youth Verdict. In this role, she led the opposition to Waratah Coal's proposed mine in Galilee. She was awarded the Goldman Environmental Prize for Islands and Island Nations in 2024.

== Biography ==
Johnson is Wirdi and was born into a "legacy of resistance fighters". Her family were the first Aboriginal family to return to Nebo. When she was seven, her family was excluded from a parade in their hometown, so they instead performed traditional dances on a trailer.

She first became an activist at nineteen, when she decided to request an environmental impact statement about the proposed Adani coal mine. Although that didn't succeed, she was invited by elders, including her uncle Adrian Burragubba, to work on the campaign against that coal mine as a youth spokesperson for the Wangan and Jagalingou family council. In this campaign, she emphasized protecting the water sources around the coal mine, such as the Great Artesian Basin.

She went on to become Co-Director of Youth Verdict. As Co-Director of Youth Verdict, she led the campaign against the Galilee Mine Project proposed by Waratah Coal, starting with outreach to First Nations communities across the state. She partnered with a public interest law firm to legally challenge this. In the Land Court, she argued that the climate change effects would violate the human rights of Indigenous Australians all across Australia. She persuaded the Land Court to hear the testimony of First Nations people by going to First Nations territory. During the preparation for the case, she went into labor and had her first child.

Ultimately, the Land Court ruled in favor of Johnson, recommending the blocking of the coal mine, and the judgement was affirmed in appeal.

She has discussed her belief that true climate justice requires Indigenous land management principles. She has also spoken about the cultural and sacred importance of environmental protection to Indigenous Australians, such as the protection of water and of totem animals.

She was awarded the Liberty Victoria Young Voltaire Award in 2023 along with fellow Co-Director Monique Jeffs. She was awarded the Goldman Environmental Prize for Islands and Island Nations in 2024. That same year, she was featured in Living on Earth.
