= Alpha Coal Project =

Coordinates: 23°15′04″S 146°27′18″E

The Alpha Coal Project is a coal mine and railway project in Queensland, Australia. The development is expected to cost A$6.9 billion. Coal exports would leave the country via port facilities at Abbot Point after being transported along a 495 km rail line.

The project is being jointly developed by the Indian conglomerate GVK and Hancock Coal. Hancock holds a 21% interest in the project. The life of mine is expected to be 30 years.

The mine is the first to be approved by both the Government of Queensland and the Federal Government to be built in the Galilee Basin. State approval was granted on the 29 May 2012 and federal approval was granted on the 23 August 2012. According to GVK Hancock Coal managing director Paul Mulder, it is also the first fully integrated project to be built in Australia. The major benefit of this is that queues of ships waiting for cargo off-shore from the port can be avoided.

The mine is to be built about 40 km northwest of the small town of Alpha in Central West Queensland. 4,000 staff are expected to be employed during construction with another 2,000 needed for on-going operations.

The Minister for Environment Tony Burke has stipulated the project must adhere to 19 conditions aimed at protecting the Great Barrier Reef.

Peak production is expected to reach 80 million tonnes per year. The first coal production is planned to occur during the 2015/16 financial year. It is expected to deliver coal to ship at $55 a tonne. This is because ore at the mine is easy to mine and the terrain between the mine and port is relatively flat. A 2013 Oxford University study forecast a coal price of at least $US90 to go forward and $150 to generate economic gains for the project. A slowing in demand from China was also cited as a concern which would influence the viability of the mine.

== See also ==
- Coal mining in Australia
