= Jegurupadu Combined Cycle Power Plant =

Power plant in Andhra Pradesh, India

Coordinates: 16.9169851°N 81.8530153°E

Jegurupadu Combined Cycle Power Plant is located at Jegurupadu in East Godavari district in the Indian state of Andhra Pradesh. The power plant is one of the gas based power plants of GVK Group. It was commissioned in 1997.

== Capacity ==
The power plant has installed capacity of 445 MW.
