= Burragubba =

Australian musician

Adrian Burragubba is an Aboriginal Australian musician skilled in didgeridoo, particularly known for his 33 years busking in Brisbane's Queen Street Mall and the past 20 years in the Gold Coast's Cavil Mall. He is also known for having stood for Queensland parliament in 2004 seeking full reimbursement of past Aboriginal wages 'stolen' by the Queensland Government. He also made the news when he was the victim of an apparently racially motivated attack while performing.

== Musical career ==
His musical performances combine traditional Aboriginal dress and body painting with instruments including an unkeyed didgeridoo and clapsticks. Renowned for his busking, Adrian has been a notable figure in Brisbane's Queen Street Mall for the past 30 years and for 17 years in Cavill Ave, Surfers Paradise.

He has performed at venues for the Brisbane Lord Mayor's office, the Queensland Premier's Department, and at other events requiring a "traditional" Aboriginal presence.

He has released two musical compilations, Didj In Us (2001) and Didj a Tale (2007), as well as a "Beginners Guide to Playing Didjeridoo" (2008).

His musical career is supported by speeches and school performances explaining Aboriginal Australian culture and history. International performances include appearances promoting Aboriginal Australian culture in the United States, Canada, Europe and Asia.

== Political activism ==
Burragubba is an activist for the reimbursement of Aboriginal Australians for unpaid work performed for governments in the early days of white settlement in Australia. In 2004 he stood for the Queensland parliament against Premier Peter Beattie, arguing that the Government's offer of $4,000 reimbursement for each worker was insulting to his people. He attracted 310 primary votes.

A hunger strike was threatened to highlight the need for Aboriginal culture to be recognised in Brisbane.

== Personal life ==
Burragubba is from the Babinburra Clan of the Wangan people and the Jagalingou people of the Wiirdi language group of Central Queensland.

He was born in Brisbane and is recognised by the traditional owners as having historical connection. His niece is Murrawah Maroochy Johnson.

== See also ==
- Indigenous Australian music
