= Carmichael coal mine =

Coal mine in Queensland, Australia

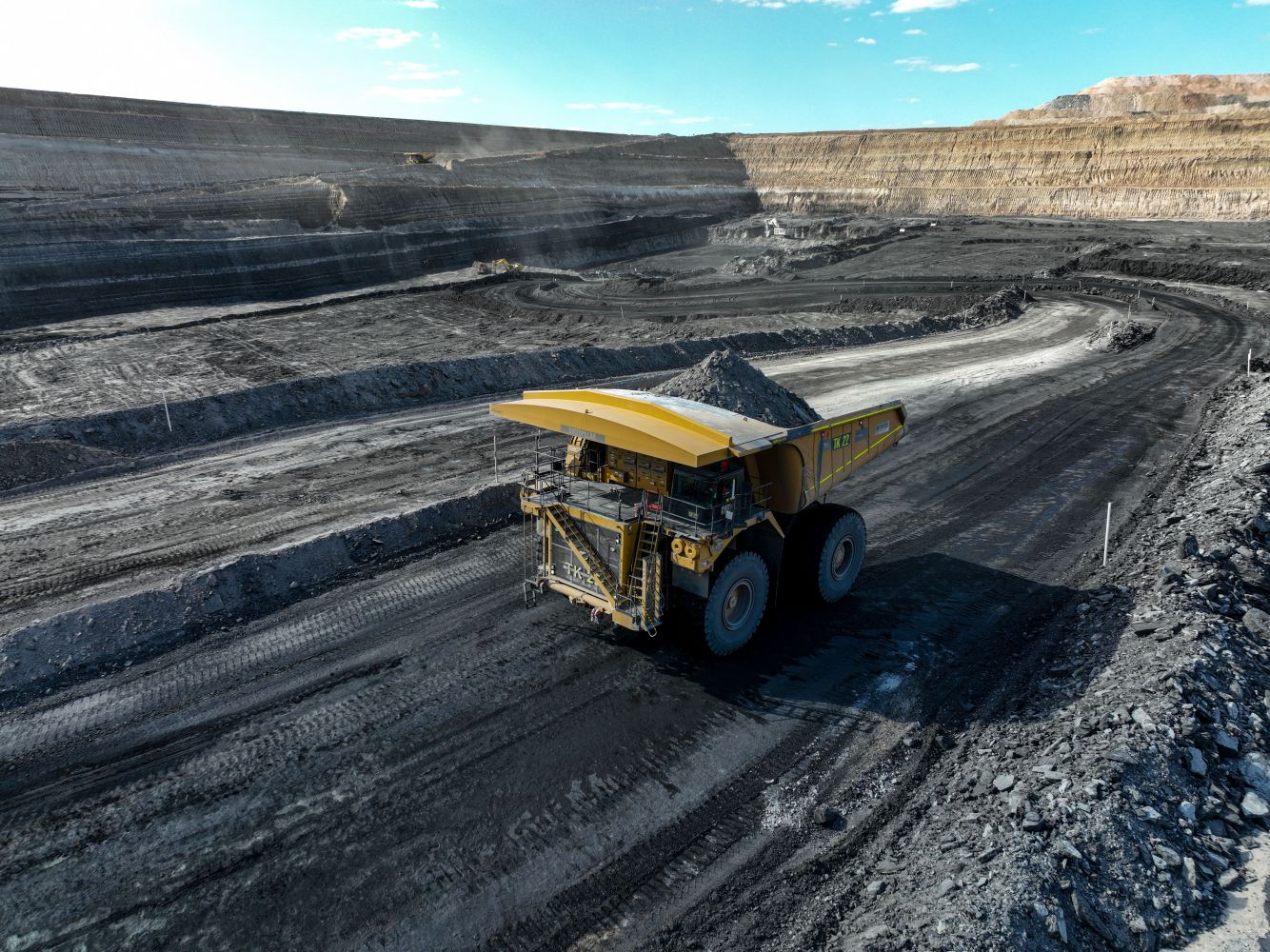

- Location within Queensland
- Location: Isaac Region, Queensland, Australia; 22°03′S 146°23′E
- Products: Thermal coal
- Type: Open-pit
- Company: Bravus Mining & Resources, an Adani Group subsidiary
- Website: Official website

The Carmichael coal mine is a coal mine in Queensland, Australia, owned by the Adani Group's Australian subsidiary Bravus Mining & Resources. It was approved by the government in 2014 and has been operational since December 2021. The mine was initially planned to produce 60 million tonnes of coal per year; however, funding difficulties resulted in downsizing the planned mine to produce 10 million tonnes per year. Construction of the mine started in June 2019, and on 29 December 2021 the first coal shipment from the Carmichael Mine was ready for export.

The mine has drawn criticism for its environmental impacts on the Great Barrier Reef, water usage, and carbon emissions, leading to a campaign known as Stop Adani. It has been dogged by legal issues relating mainly to the environmental aspects. Other contentious issues are its claimed economic benefits, financial viability, and use of taxpayer funding. For instance, a major point of contention was the proposed $1 billion loan for Adani’s Carmichael coal rail project. Critics, including the Australia Institute, argued that public funds should not be used to support coal infrastructure at a time when Australia needed to transition to renewables.

== History ==
The mine was announced in 2010, initially with a forecast mining duration of 90 years, which was later reduced to 60 years. The federal government approved the project in July 2014. Associated works included new port terminals and seabed dredging at the Abbot Point, and it was planned to dump the drudge on land. The coal was planned to be transported by rail (including the Goonyella railway line) to the ports at Hay Point and Abbot Point.

However, the approval was set aside in August 2015, when the Federal Court of Australia found that environment minister Greg Hunt did not correctly follow requirements under Environment Protection and Biodiversity Conservation Act 1999 regarding the yakka skink and ornamental snake endangered species. This led to considerable controversy and the project was re-approved in October 2015.

The mine was initially planned to produce 60 million tonnes of coal per year; however, funding difficulties resulted in downsizing the planned mine to produce 10 million tonnes per year.

In June 2019 Adani Australia commenced construction of the Carmichael mine. The company aimed to be starting commercial-scale coal mining by the end of 2021. Mine approvals and construction were delayed by campaigns run by traditional owners and environmentalists, which included non-violent direct action at the construction site.

The thermal coal produced by the mine was predicted to consist of 11% ash and have a weighted average value of 5,000–5,500 kcal/kg.

In November 2020, Adani changed the name of its Australian subsidiary, which operates the mine, from Adani Mining to Bravus Mining & Resources.

The company was the "jersey sleeve" sponsor of the North Queensland Cowboys NRL rugby league team for the 2021 season.

On 29 December 2021, the first coal shipment from the Carmichael Mine was ready for export.

== Location ==
The mine is located in Central Queensland, with the majority of the site being within the Isaac Region and a small portion being within the Charters Towers Region.

The coal was formed as part of the Galilee Basin, a 247,000 square kilometre inland region which includes aquifers that are a part of the Great Artesian Basin underground fresh water source. Mining operations currently consist of small-scale barite, bentonite, calcite, gypsum; limestone, opals; phosphate and potassium mines; there is no history of coal mining of the basin.

== Mine and associated facilities ==
The mine is intended to be an open-cut mine (compared with earlier designs which also included underground mines) with 279 km^{2} (108 sq mi) of land being excavated. The total area of the mine site is planned to be 447 km^{2} (173 sq mi).

The original plan included a new 388 kilometres (241 mi) long standard-gauge railway, which was proposed to be paid for by taxpayers. In September 2018, Adani announced that it had abandoned plans to build the standard-gauge line in favour of a 200 km (124 mi) extension to a nearby existing narrow-gauge railway. This railway is planned to connect the mine to the maritime freight terminal at Abbot Point and construction began in mid-2020. Construction of the approximately 200km Carmichael Rail Network was completed in September 2021.

In January 2020, in response to protests in Berlin by Extinction Rebellion, Siemens announced it would re-evaluate its $20m contract to supply signalling systems for the rail link, but decided to continue with the contract saying there was "practically no legally and economically responsible way to unwind the contract without neglecting fiduciary duties."

The fly-in fly-out (FIFO) workers for the mine during the construction phase were based in the regional cities of Rockhampton and Townsville. A new airstrip close to the mine was proposed to be constructed, at a cost to taxpayers of $31 million to $34 million. Following public criticisms and the project delays, government funding for the proposed airstrip was cancelled and the airstrip was paid for by Adani. Flights to the airstrip began in June 2020.

The subcontract for the construction of a 189 km (117 mi) railway line to the mine was signed in 2020. The company stated that it had approximately 2000 employees in November 2020 and approximately 2600 employees in June 2021.

The Bravus subsidiary Bowen Rail Company operates the coal trains on the Carmichael Rail Network.

== Environmental impacts ==
=== Greenhouse gas emissions ===
According to the environmental impact statement, the mine was expected to produce 200 million tonnes of carbon dioxide, based on a 60-year lifespan.

In April 2019, Bob Brown led a convoy of vehicles to protest against the proposed coal mine. The protest was criticised by pro-coal lobby groups and is considered a factor in the Queensland voters' swing away from progressive parties in the 2019 Australian federal election.

Greta Thunberg drew international attention to the mine in January 2020, when she called on large German-based industrial corporation Siemens AG (which claimed to be one of the first companies to have pledged to be carbon neutral by 2030) to stop the delivery of railway equipment for the mine. Siemens responded that it "should have been wiser about this project beforehand", but declined to cancel the contract.

=== Water – rivers and underground sources ===
Adani had initially planned to use 12,500 megalitres per year from the Belyando River for the Carmichael coal mine. Regarding the reduction on the local water table, the company's Supplementary Environmental Impact Statement stated that "maximum impacts in excess of 300 metres are predicted". Beyond the mine boundary, Adani's groundwater model predicted water table levels to drop "typically between 20 and 50m" and "up to around 4m in the vicinity of the [Carmichael] river". During a hearing in the QLD Land Court, Adani's representatives defended predictions drawn from drilling data, despite allegations of this being insufficient to determine risks of collapses underground that could impact groundwater systems.

=== Endangered species ===
The mine site area is home to a number of species, including the yakka skink, ornamental snake, and the waxy cabbage palm. The mine site is home to the largest known community of black throated finches, and the operation of the mine is subject to a Black-Throated Finch Management Plan.

The finches' population is in decline, and the southern subspecies is threatened, having vanished from 80% of its former range. Adani Australia produced a management plan for the finch, proposing to gradually clear land around the mine and force the finches to move away. The plan was heavily criticised by some ecologists, who highlighted the plan to graze cattle on protected land and noted the land was tagged to be used for other projects. There was also a lack of transparency and consultation with experts in the field.

=== Environmental activism: Stop Adani ===
The mine drawn criticism for its environmental impacts on the Great Barrier Reef, water usage, and carbon emissions. Since approval for the mine was given by the government in 2014, campaigners have opposed the project with hundreds of rallies and other actions targeting 145 companies, as part of a campaign known as Stop Adani,

Similarly, public opinion on the Adani Carmichael coal mine in Queensland has been divided. The Australia Institute polling found that 44% of respondents opposed the project, while 30% expressed support. Among these, 23% were strongly opposed, whereas 8% were strongly in favour. Further, research highlighted why Adani's Carmichael coal mine is not yet "ready to go", highlighting several significant factors that may delay its progress.

== Financial issues ==
In 2015, a number of major international banks publicly ruled out financing the coal mine, railway line or shipping terminal. This included more than half of the top 20 coal financing banks globally, such as Citigroup, JP Morgan Chase, Goldman Sachs, Deutsche Bank, Royal Bank of Scotland, HSBC, Barclays, Credit Agricole and Société Générale. Standard Chartered provided financing to the project, but Adani ended the bank's advisory contract.

Large coal projects in Australia typically engage with one or more of the "big four" Australian banks in arranging or providing debt. However, National Australia Bank announced in September 2015 that it would not fund the project, followed by Westpac in April 2015 and ANZ Bank in August 2017.

Before the mine's construction, some analysts doubted the mine was viable given the price of coal at the time. In November 2014, one analyst predicted that a price of about $100–$110 a tonne was required for the project be financially viable. The price of coal fluctuated significantly over following years; from US$60/t in 2015, then US$115/t in 2018 and US$170/t in May 2021. The company claims that it has agreements in place to sell 10 million tonnes of coal from the mine.

== Taxpayer funding ==
In 2014, the Queensland Liberal National Party state government proposed reduced taxes for the project in the form of an open-ended royalty rate "holiday", and for taxpayers to pay for the sediment dumping facility in the Caley Valley wetlands. The Labor opposition criticised the secrecy surrounding the costs and suggested that up to $1.08 billion of public money would be required.

The Australia Institute has been a vocal critic of the proposed $1 billion subsidised loan from the Northern Australia Infrastructure Facility (NAIF) to Adani for its Carmichael coal mine and rail project in Queensland. The Institute argued that redirecting this loan to other industries—such as tourism, agriculture, manufacturing, and renewable energy—would yield greater economic, environmental, and political benefits for Australia. In 2017, the Queensland Government exercised its power to veto the proposed NAIF loan to Adani. This decision was influenced by public opinion, as polling indicated that Queenslanders opposed the loan and preferred funding to be allocated to other sectors. Despite the veto, Adani proceeded with the Carmichael coal mine project, which produced its first coal in late 2021.

Following the Queensland Labor Party's victory in the 2015 state election, the Labor party vowed to not use state funds for the railway line, however the party called on the Australian Liberal National government to use federal taxpayer money for the railway line. The federal government considered the proposal, however in the end it was not successful.

In 2017, the Australia Institute highlighted concerns about potential financial concessions being negotiated between the Queensland Government and Adani regarding coal royalties. Specifically, the release suggests that a proposed "royalty holiday" could result in Adani receiving free coal for five years and discounted coal for an additional four years, potentially costing the Queensland budget approximately $1.2 billion in lost revenue.

In October 2020, the Queensland Labor Party government announced that the royalties deal for the coal mine had been signed. The deal includes deferring royalty payments for an unspecified period.

== Indigenous community impacts ==
=== Native title court cases ===
In 2016, a group of Indigenous landholders, including youth spokesperson Murrawah Maroochy Johnson, launched a case in the Queensland Supreme court against the granting of Adani's mining lease, on the basis that they had not been properly consulted. The court ruled against overturning the mining lease. A 2018 appeal upheld the 2016 decision.

=== Land use agreements ===
At a 2017 meeting, the majority of Wangan and Jagalingou (W&J) people present voted to accept the proposed mining rights deal presented by Adani. However, several W&J people have stated that they were paid by Adani to attend, or that their vote against the deal was not counted. The resulting indigenous land use agreement was accepted by 7 of 12 W&J representatives.

A 2019 appeal by the other 5 W&J representatives was dismissed by the Federal Court, with Adani seeking $600,000 in court costs from the W&J representatives.

As of August 2022, members of the Wangan and Jagalingou people continue to occupy a cultural ceremony and camp site near the mine.

== Legal issues ==
=== 2015: Federal EPBC approval (initial case) ===
In January 2015, the Mackay Conservation Group, challenged the July 2013 federal approval of the Carmichael project by Greg Hunt, Environment Minister, under the Environment Protection and Biodiversity Conservation Act 1999. The Federal Court of Australia case involved three main contentions, that the Minister did not take into account the greenhouse gas emissions, the company's environmental record in India and the "approved conservation advice" for the Yakka Skink and the ornamental snake.

The court set aside the approval due to concerns regarding the yakka skink and ornamental snake, effectively overturning the approval.

Following this decision, the attorney-general at the time, George Brandis, stated his intention to disallow third parties from challenging the minister's approvals under the Environment Protection and Biodiversity Conservation Act 1999. This amendment to the Act did not occur. In October 2015, the coal mine was re-approved by the federal environment minister.

Richard Denniss, Executive Director of The Australia Institute, provided expert witness testimony in a court challenge against the approval of a major coal mine in the Galilee Basin. Adani have long claimed in public that the Carmichael mine project will create 10,000 jobs; however, in court, Adani’s own economist testified that the project would only create 1,464 jobs—just 14% of the publicly stated figure.

=== 2015-2016: Queensland mining leases and environmental authority ===
In 2015, the Land Services of Coast and Country (LSCC) group launched a case in the Queensland Land Court challenging the Queensland coordinator-general's Mining Lease and Environmental Authority approvals. LSCC contended the approval was flawed regarding the economic, environmental, and financial impact of the mine. The court's verdict in December 2015 did not overturn the approval, but placed extra environmental requirements on the mine. LSCC applied in 2016 for an appeal in the Supreme Court of Queensland, and this application was unsuccessful.

The mine's claimed economic benefits are a disputed issue.

=== 2016-2017: Federal EPBC approval regarding impacts on Great Barrier Reef ===
The Australian Conservation Foundation (ACF) made a judicial review challenge under the Environment Protection and Biodiversity Conservation Act 1999 (EPBC Act) in late 2015, arguing that proper procedure was not followed when the Minister did not take into account the impact of emissions on the Great Barrier Reef.

The ACF appealed the decision in the Federal Court of Australia, which was unsuccessful.

The court ruled in favour of the government, based on the argument that only considering the direct emissions from mining operations (and not the emissions caused by the burning of its coal) is a decision at the minister's discretion. The case hinged on a market substitution defence, which has been criticised as "the only significant barrier remaining to a successful climate change case".

=== 2018: Federal EPBC approval- exemption for water usage from the Sutton River ===
The Australian Conservation Foundation (ACF), represented by Environmental Defenders Office Queensland, lodged a judicial review challenge in the Federal Court in December 2018 of the Federal Environment Minister's decision to not apply appropriate legislation regarding water.

The review challenged then-Environment Minister Melissa Price's decision to waive a full environmental assessment for water use from the Suttor River in central Queensland. Adani notified the government that the act was a controlled act but the government decided that it was not a controlled activity under the EPBC Act and that no environmental impact assessment was needed for it to proceed.

Under amendments to the EPBC Act known as the water trigger, the Minister must obtain advice from an Independent Expert Scientific Committee on Coal Seam Gas and Large Coal Mining Development if an activity is likely to have a significant impact on water resources or impact on a protected ecological communities, species, World Heritage Sites, national heritage sites, or protected wetlands. The water trigger was added to the EPBC Act in 2013 by Tony Windsor.

In June 2019, the application was allowed by consent, meaning the Australian Government would reassess the project’s water use.

=== 2020: Federal EPBC approval- exemption for water pipeline project ===
In March 2020, the Australian Conservation Foundation (ACF) launched a judicial review application regarding the water pipeline for the project (called the North Galilee Water Scheme Infrastructure Project). The application argued that the water pipeline should require assessment under the EPBC water trigger.

The federal court ruled in favour of the ACF in May 2021, thereby requiring the minister to reconsider the environmental impacts associated with the mine's water pipeline before it is approved.

== See also ==
- Coal mining in Australia
- List of mines in Australia
