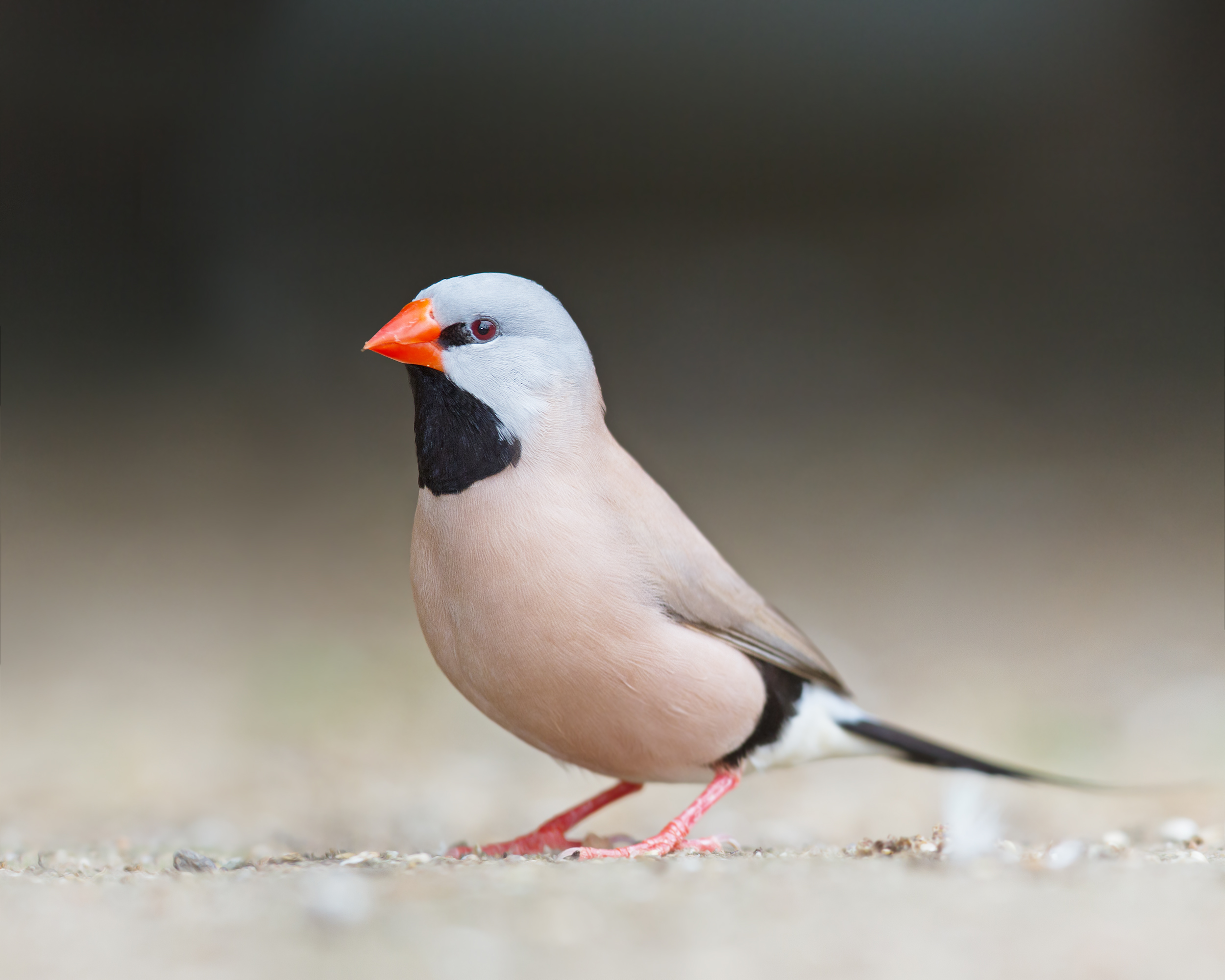

Conservation status
- Least Concern (IUCN 3.1)

Scientific classification
- Kingdom: Animalia
- Phylum: Chordata
- Class: Aves
- Order: Passeriformes
- Family: Estrildidae
- Genus: Poephila
- Species: P. acuticauda

Binomial name
- Poephila acuticauda (Gould, 1840)
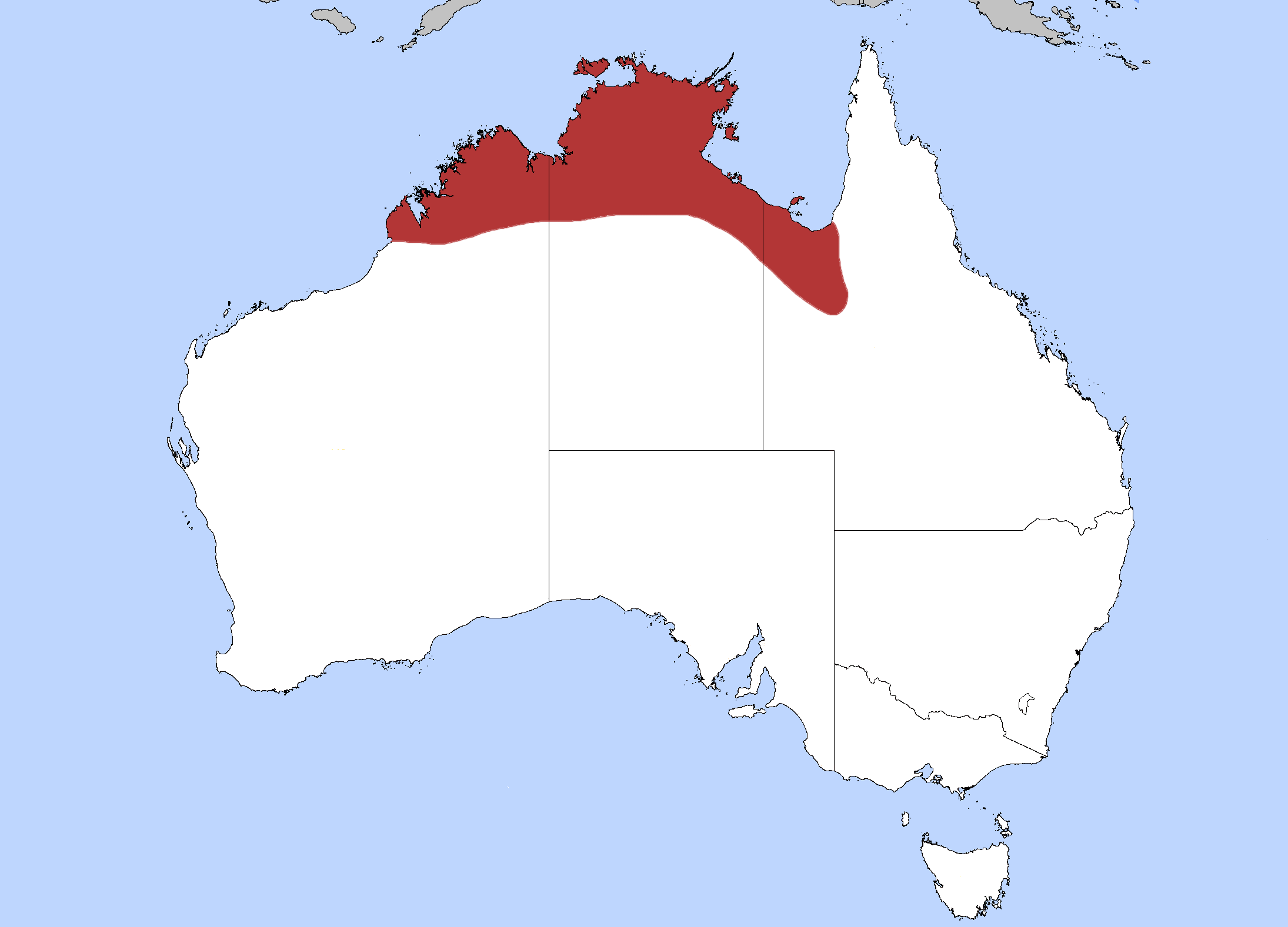
- Distribution

= Long-tailed finch =

Species of bird

The long-tailed finch (Poephila acuticauda) is a common species of estrildid finch found in northern Australia, from the Kimberley region to the Gulf of Carpentaria. It is a predominantly fawn-coloured bird with a pale grey head and prominent black bib and eyes. It inhabits dry savannah habitats in Australia and adapts readily to aviculture. It is known as the Hex finch in the United Kingdom, and Heck's finch in other parts of the world.

== Taxonomy ==
The species Poephila acuticauda was first described by ornithologist John Gould in 1840, placing the new taxon as Amadina acuticauda. The specimen was collected by Benjamin Bynoe, the surgeon aboard HMS Beagle, at Derby on the north-west coast of Australia. It is one of three species in the genus Poephila. It is placed in the Australo-papuan finch family Estrildidae, although this family itself was previously placed in the sparrow family Passeridae.

A variety of subspecific arrangements had been regarded as colour variation across an east to west cline, although the geographically distinct morphology came to be acknowledged in the late twentieth century. Further support was given in a genetic study published in 2005 showed that the two subspecies of the long-tailed finch were separated from each other by the Kimberley Plateau–Arnhem Land Barrier around 340,000 years ago, and their ancestors diverged from the black-throated finch (P. cincta) across the Carpentarian Barrier 600 thousand years ago.

The Australian Faunal Directory recognises three Poephila species, arranged as two subgenera, the population is also separated as two subspecies. This treatment may be summarised as

genus Poephila

- subgenus Poephila (Neopoephila) Mathews, 1913
- subgenus Poephila (Poephila) Gould, 1842
  - species Poephila (Poephila) cincta (Gould, 1837)
  - species Poephila (Poephila) acuticauda (Gould, 1840)
    - subspecies Poephila (Poephila) acuticauda acuticauda
    - subspecies Poephila (Poephila) acuticauda hecki Heinroth, 1900

Common names for the species have been assigned or arisen from usage in aviculture, these include the long-tailed finch or longtail, blackheart finch, shaft-tail finch, orange-billed finch or grassfinch. Heck's grassfinch or finch, or Heck's longtail is applied to the eastern subspecies Poephila acuticauda hecki with red beaks, and the nominate subspecies with orange or yellow beaks is referred by the common name for the species.

== Description ==
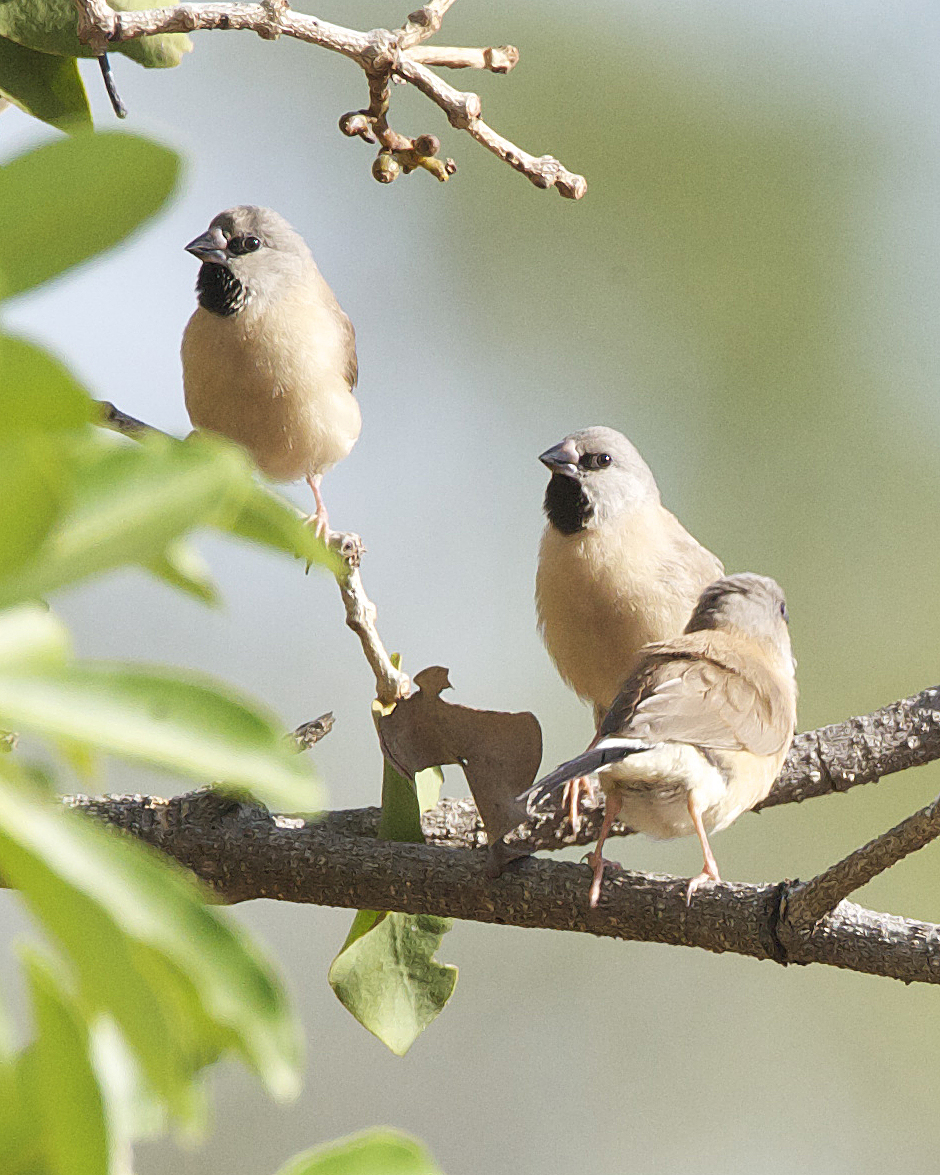
Juveniles at Wulagi, Darwin, Australia

The adult long-tailed finch is around 160 mm in length, the weight range of males is 13.5–16.2 grams and females 11.4–17.6 g. It has a prominent roundish black bib on its throat and upper chest and a long pointed black tail. It has pinkish brown upperparts with paler plumage below its bib over the lower breast and abdomen. It has a grey head, a white ear-patch, and black lores. It has black patches on its upper flanks and its rump and undertail coverts are white. The beak colour of the adult long-tailed finch varies from red through orange to yellow. Males and females are similar, except the females may be slightly duller and may have a slightly smaller bib. Females have shorter wings and tails than males on average, but their measurements, as well as throat bib size, generally lie within the range of male measurements. Furthermore, male and female plumage is indistinguishable in ultraviolet and visible light. A study published in 1999 showed that male long-tailed finches were unable to determine the sex of unfamiliar members of their species unless the latter bird declared its sex by song. Juveniles have black beaks and shorter tail feathers.

The subspecies are distinguished by the bill coloration, the nominate western group presenting a yellow colour and the eastern P. acuticauda hecki is red.

== Behaviour ==
Singing in an aviary

The species maintain a simple pair bond, with some records of extended family groups or in small flocks; the pairs remain in close proximity when engaged in their activities. Individuals use song to identify themselves to a partner, and they maintain contact with a 'distance call' Male P. acuticauda approach unfamiliar members of the species and engage in a courtship display, holding themselves in an upright posture and singing, before attempting to mate with the newcomer. Male newcomers will sometimes not declare their sex when confronted by a group of birds. The authors of the study propose this is a survival mechanism to reduce harassment, increase chances of acceptance into the group and hence chances of future reproduction.

The species breeds in natural hollows of trees or lower vegetation like tussocks of grass or shrubs. Where trees are available, the nest site may be over 4 metres from the ground, perhaps as high as 18 m. Eucalpyts are a favoured tree species, and pandanus are also selected. Breeding nests are carefully constructed from grass, the outer layer composed of broader blades 150–200 mm long and the inner chamber with a nesting cup woven from fine stems and seed-heads; woolly plant fibres and sometimes feathers are used to line the inner chamber. The total length of this structure is from 180 to 230 mm and is composed of up to 500 pieces, which includes an entrance is between 50 too 100 mm, in bottle or funnel shaped form. The nest used for roosting outside of the breeding season is a simpler design

Pairs share feeding responsibilities, and there has been one report of birds from older broods helping their parents raise the following brood, the first time that cooperative breeding has been recorded in an Australian estrildid finch. The clutch consists of four to six dull white oval eggs measuring 17 x 12 mm. A survey in the Kimberley recorded the clutch sizes as 10 × 4, 10 × 5 and 3 nests × 6 eggs. The incubation period is 13 to 17 days.

== Distribution and habitat ==
The long-tailed finch inhabits open woodland across northern Australia, from Derby in the northwest Kimberley region across to the east to the Leichhardt River in northwest Queensland.

It has an estimated global extent of occurrence of 1,000,000–10,000,000 km^{2}. The IUCN has classified threats to the population of the species as being of least concern.

== Aviculture ==
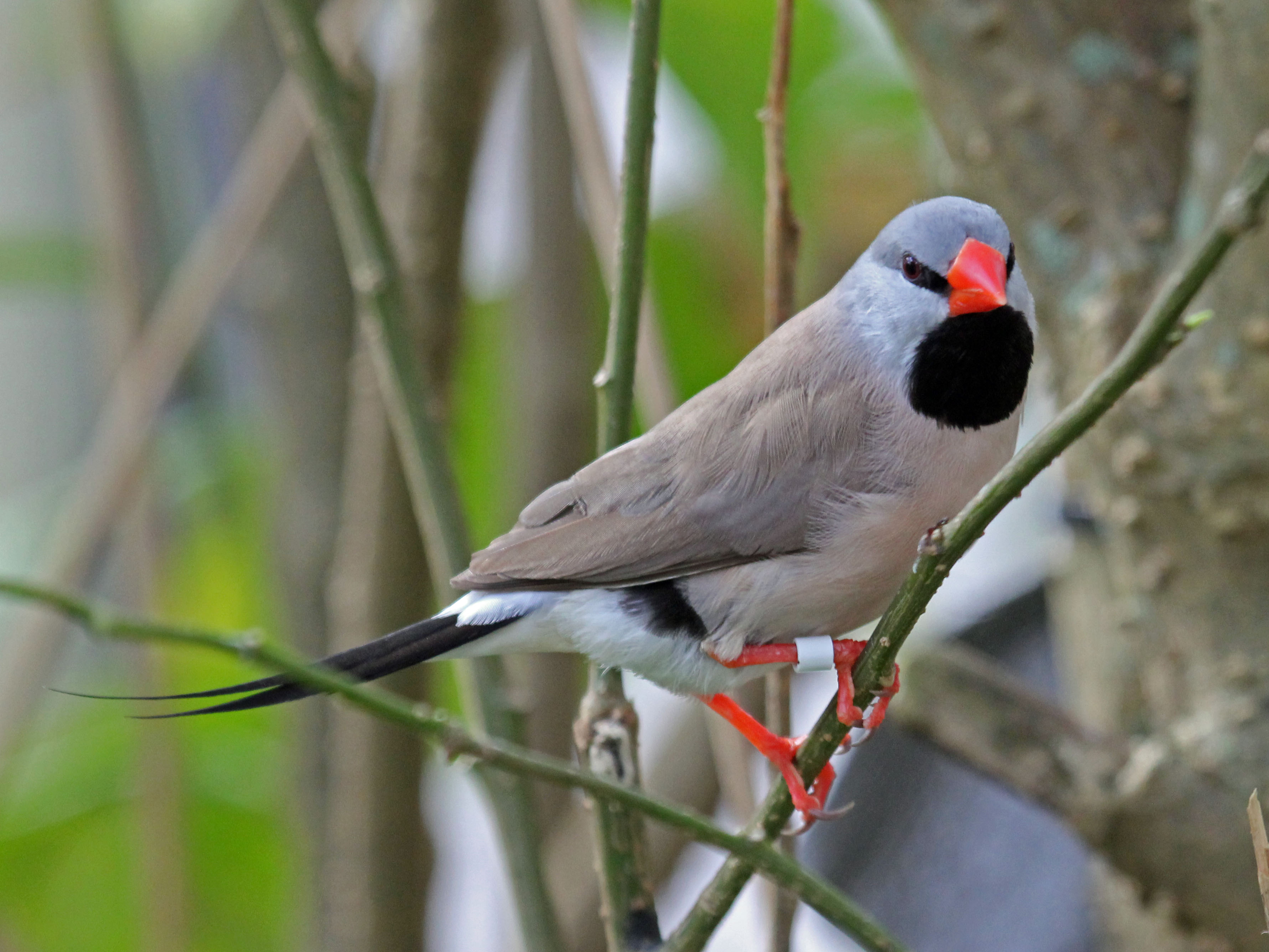
P. a. hecki at Butterfly World, Florida in the United States

The long-tailed finch adapts readily to captivity, although it requires an aviary rather than a cage to thrive, and damp conditions need to be avoided. Export of the species has been banned from Australia, and they have become rather expensive in the UK. A caged pair are best kept on their own in the breeding season, because they become aggressive to other small finches. They breed readily in captivity, sometimes producing two broods a year, and live for around 5 to 8 years. In captivity, a pair of Heck's grass finches (P. a. hecki) might raise brood after brood continuously, which would jeopardise their health, if they are not fed with an adequate diet all year round. Alternatively, the sexes can be separated for the winter.

The species was well established in aviaries by the 1930s and regarded as robust specimens with interesting behaviours and an appealing appearance. The first record of successful breeding of the yellow-billed subspecies was in 1897, and the red-billed grass-finch was reproducing in English aviaries around a decade later, The species was also being bred in its native country during this period, including from pairs held at the Australian Museum. By the twenty first century these finches became popular amongst avicultural enthusiasts in European, Asian, and North American countries, and in South Africa, the species is recorded but rare in New Zealand. These finches are not common in the United Kingdom, being second after the Gouldian finch Chloebia gouldiae in terms of scarcity of breeders and availability.
