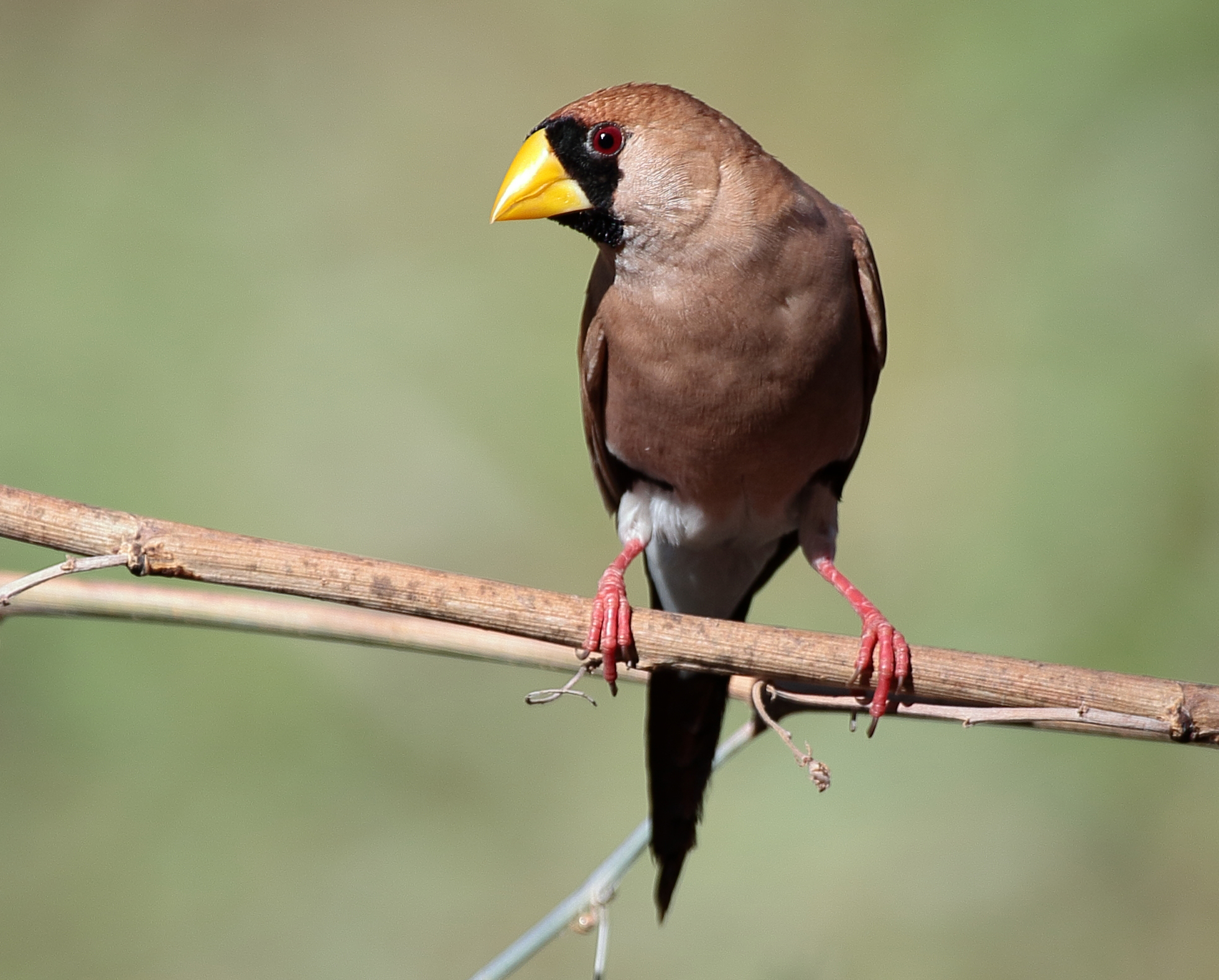
- Gregory River, Queensland, Australia

Conservation status
- Least Concern (IUCN 3.1)

Scientific classification
- Kingdom: Animalia
- Phylum: Chordata
- Class: Aves
- Order: Passeriformes
- Family: Estrildidae
- Genus: Poephila
- Species: P. personata

Binomial name
- Poephila personata Gould, 1842
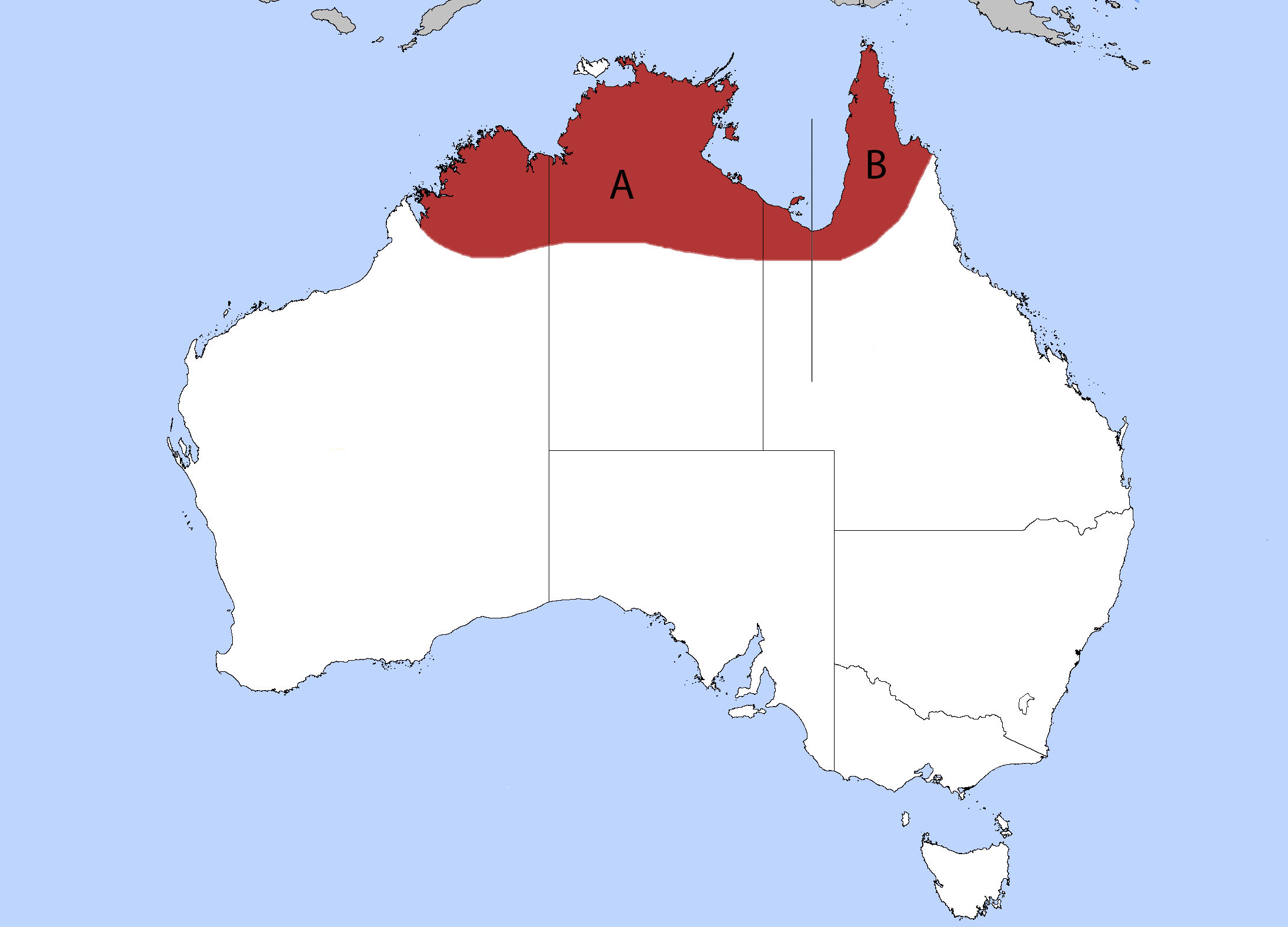
- Distribution; A = race peronata B = race leucotis

= Masked finch =

Species of bird

The masked finch (Poephila personata) is a small passerine bird in the estrildid finch family, Estrildidae. It is a common resident of dry savannah across northern Australia, from the Kimberley, across the Top End, the Gulf country and the southern part of Cape York Peninsula, as far east as Chillagoe, but always near water.

== Description ==
The masked finch is 12.5–13.5 cm (4.9–5.3 in) long. The male is larger, but the sexes are otherwise similar. It is cinnamon-brown above and paler below with a white rump, black mark on the flanks and black face mask. It has a heavy yellow bill and a pointed black tail. The eastern subspecies P. p. leucotis has whitish cheeks.

== Behaviour ==
Pairs or small flocks of masked finches forage through the day, mostly on the ground for grass seeds. In the evenings and early mornings, large numbers—sometimes thousands— can gather around waterholes to drink, cleanse, and preen, flicking their tails sideways and chattering incessantly.

Pairs build a domed nest from grasses, lined with fine grass, feathers, and charcoal, in the late wet or early dry season. The nest position varies: it can be as high as 20 metres (66 ft) or simply hidden in long grass. Five to six white eggs are laid.
