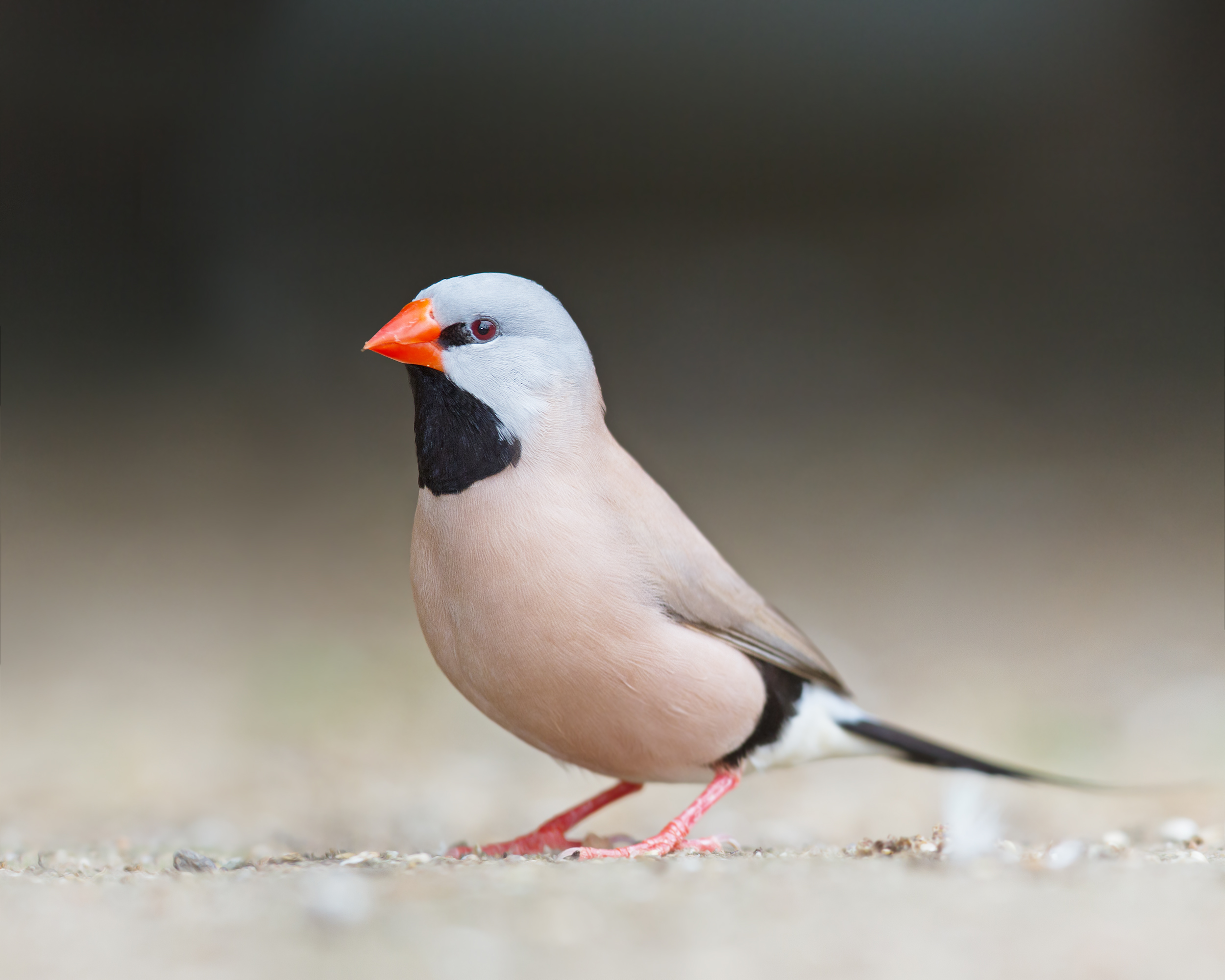
- Long-tailed finch, Poephila acuticauda

Scientific classification
- Kingdom: Animalia
- Phylum: Chordata
- Class: Aves
- Order: Passeriformes
- Family: Estrildidae
- Genus: Poephila; Gould, 1842

Type species
- Amadina acuticauda Gould, 1840

Species
- See text

= Poephila =

Genus of birds

Poephila is an Australian genus of estrildid finches.

The adults have pinkish underparts, buff or brown upperparts, a black tail and lower belly, and white rumps uppertail coverts and undertail coverts. Males and females closely resemble each other, although the male is a little larger.

These are birds of dry open grassland, occurring from the north-west to the eastern coast of Australia. They glean seed from the ground or seed-heads of grasses, occasionally supplementing their diet with insects.

== Taxonomy ==
The genus Poephila was introduced in 1842 by the English ornithologist John Gould in his The Birds of Australia in which he placed several species in the genus but did not specify a type species. In February of 1842 at a meeting of the Zoological Society in London, Gould had designated the type as Amadina acuticauda Gould, the long-tailed finch, but a report on this meeting was not published until November. The genus name combines the Ancient Greek ποιη/poiē meaning "grass" with φιλος/philos meaning "lover".

=== Species ===
The genus contains the following three species:

Image	Scientific name	Common name	Distribution
	Masked finch	Poephila personata	Northern Australia, from the Kimberley, across the Top End, the Gulf country and the southern part of Cape York Peninsula, as far east as Chillagoe
	Long-tailed finch	Poephila acuticauda	Australia, from the Kimberley region to the Gulf of Carpentaria.
	Black-throated finch	Poephila cincta	north-east Australia from Cape York Peninsula to central Queensland
