= Wangan people =

Australian aboriginal tribe of northern Queensland

The Wangan (or Babbinburra) are an Aboriginal Australian people of the Isaac Region of Central Queensland.

== Country ==
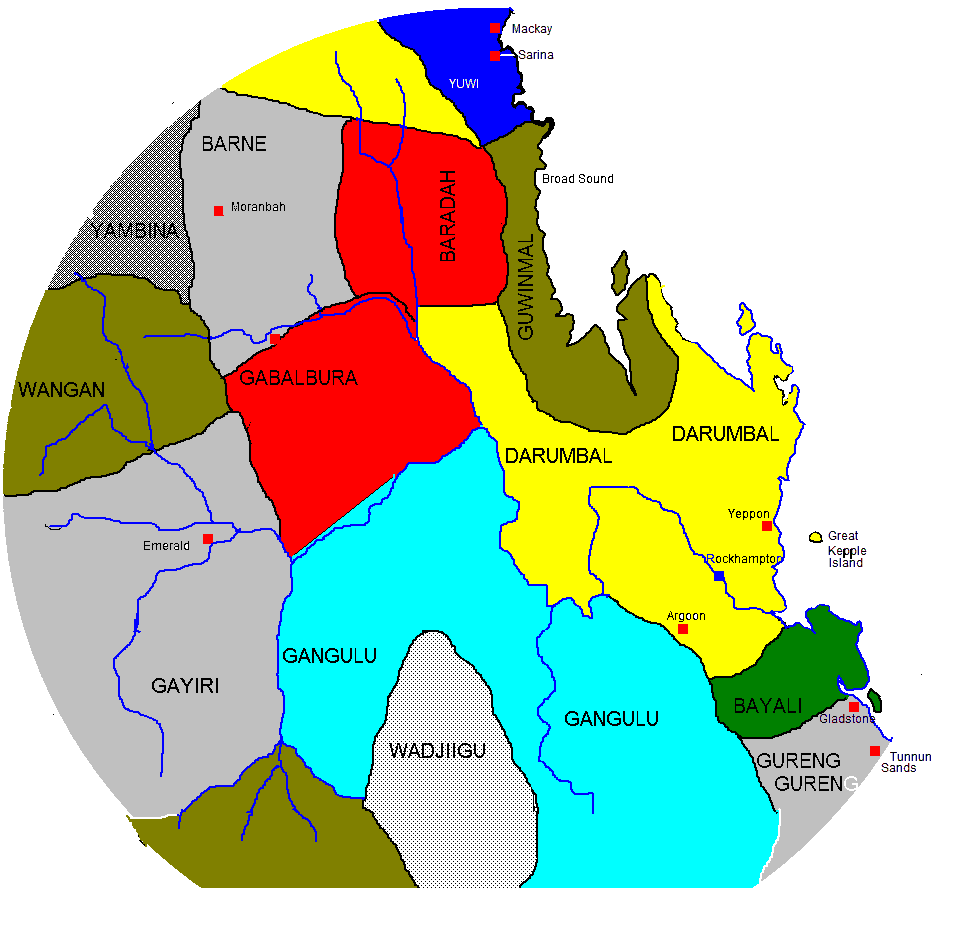
Traditional lands of tribes around Gladstone

The Wangan were estimated by Norman Tindale to have had roughly 3,000 square miles (7,800 km^{2}) of territory around Capella. These extended northwards to the vicinity of Blair Athol, and eastwards as far as the Peak Ranges. Their westward extension went as far as Drummond Range. They were also present at Peak Downs.

== Social divisions ==
One name at least survives for a clan of the Wangan, the Babbinburra, a horde that inhabited the area between Mistake Creek and Clermont. The element -burra was a suffix, meaning 'tribe, according to James Muirhead, who stated that the Babbinburra/Wangan were one of several tribes speaking the same language. (Note: The others being: (1) (K)Owanburra on the upper Belyando; (2)Wokkelburra, Lower Belyando and its junction with the Suttor; (4)Terraburra, around Alice River; (5) Mungullaburra, Fort Cooper area; (6)Koombokkaburra, on Bower Downs; (7) Muthoburra on Elgin Downs; (8)Durroburra, in Burdekin/Suttor country)

== History of contact ==
In very recent developments the descendants of the Wangan together with those of the Jagalingou have been engaged in a legal battle with the Queensland and Federal governments over the approval of the development of the Carmichael coal mine, a project run by the Adani Group.

== Notable Wangan people ==
- Adrian Burragubba, didgeridoo player.
- Raymond Stabe descendant of Apical ancestor Daisy Collins.
- Raymond Stabe autobiography book called " an understanding of me" as a stolen generation descendant and his accalaids trials and tribulations.

== Alternative names ==
- Babbinburra

== Selected vocabulary ==
- wanti (tame dog)
- aunti or woddi (father)
- yunga (mother)

== Sources ==
- "AIATSIS map of Indigenous Australia". AIATSIS. 14 May 2024.
- Brigg, Morgan; Quiggin, John; Lyons, Kristen (2017a). "Unfinished Business: Adani, the State, and the Indigenous Rights Struggle of the Wangan and Jagalingou traditional owners council" (PDF). Earthjustice.
- Brigg, Morgan; Quiggin, John; Lyons, Kristen (19 June 2017b). "The last line of defence: Indigenous rights and Adani's land deal". The Conversation.
- Muirhead, James (1887). "Belyando" (PDF). In Curr, Edward Micklethwaite (ed.). The Australian race: its origin, languages, customs, place of landing in Australia and the routes by which it spread itself over the continent. Vol. 3. Melbourne: J. Ferres. pp. 26–33.
- Tindale, Norman Barnett (1974). "Wangan (QLD)". Aboriginal Tribes of Australia: Their Terrain, Environmental Controls, Distribution, Limits, and Proper Names. Australian National University Press. ISBN 978-0-708-10741-6.
