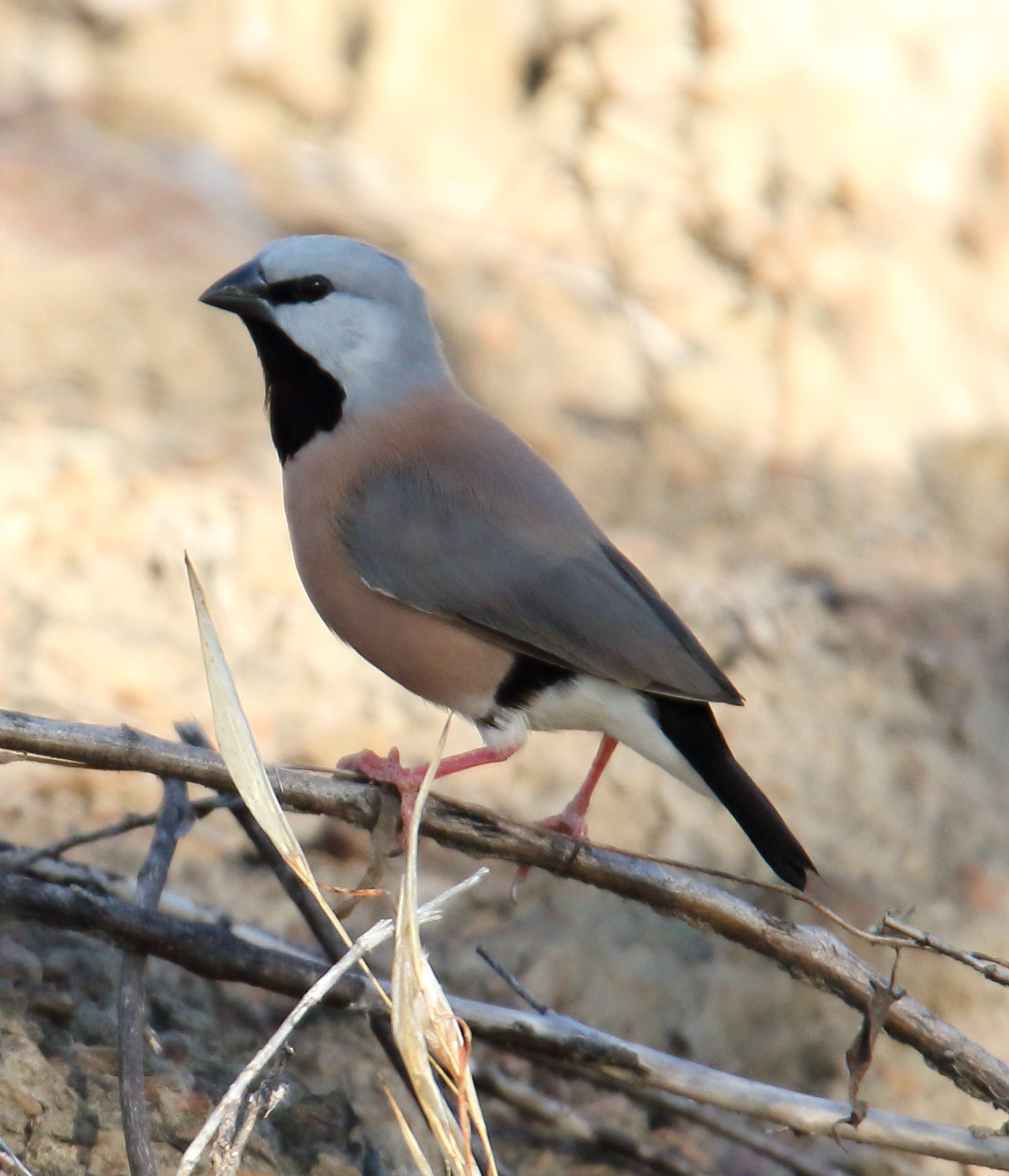
- The nominate, white-rumped southern subspecies, Poephila cincta cincta

Conservation status
- Endangered (EPBC Act)

Scientific classification
- Domain: Eukaryota
- Kingdom: Animalia
- Phylum: Chordata
- Class: Aves
- Order: Passeriformes
- Family: Estrildidae
- Genus: Poephila
- Species: P. cincta

Binomial name
- Poephila cincta (Gould, 1837)
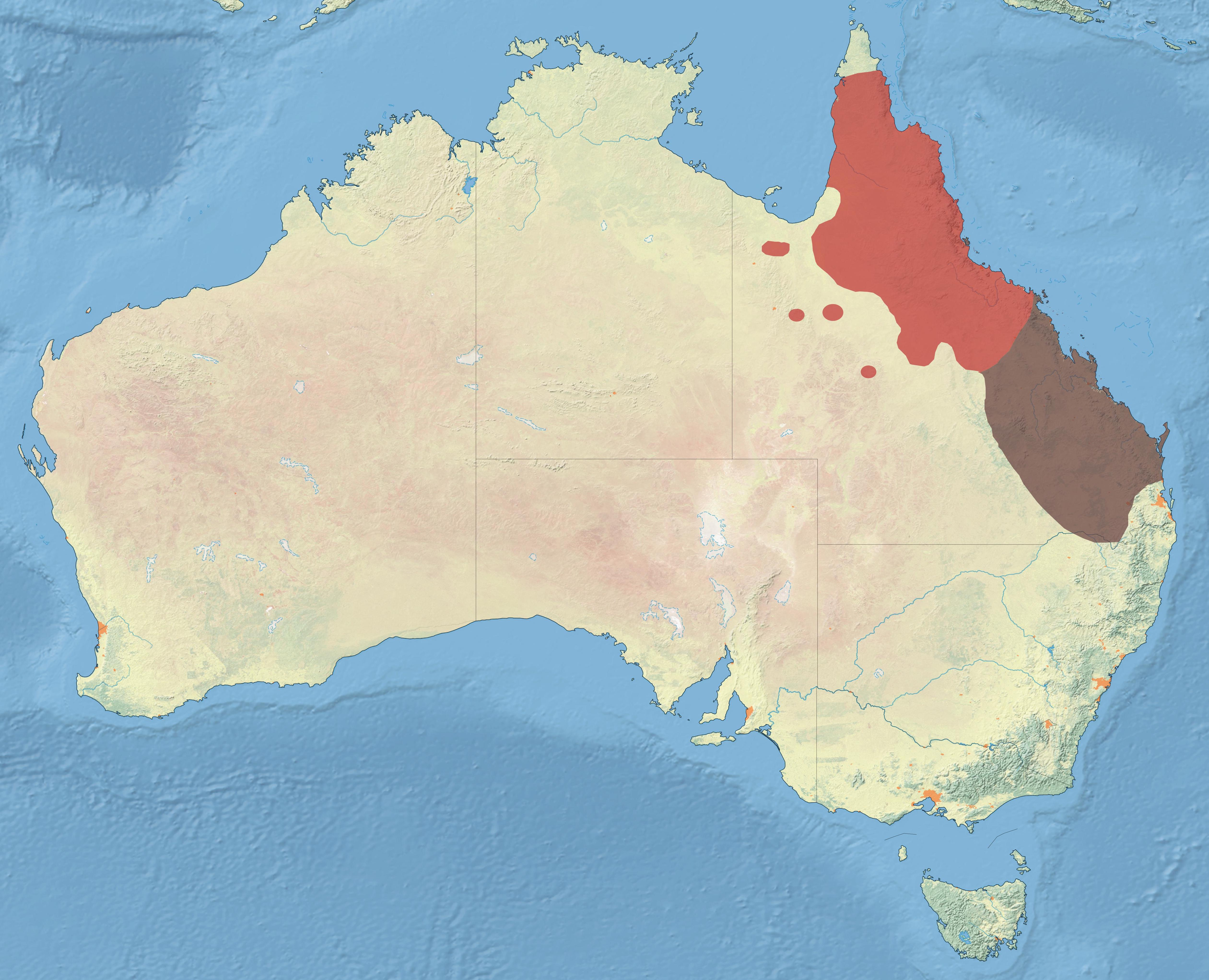
- Distribution

= Black-throated finch =

Species of Australian bird

The black-throated finch (Poephila cincta), or parson finch, is a species of estrildid finch found in grassy woodlands throughout north-east Australia from Cape York Peninsula to central Queensland. The southern black-throated finch (Poephila cincta cincta) is endangered, with a population in decline and its habitat is threatened by development, and has become extinct in New South Wales, while the northern black-throated finch (Poephila cincta atropygialis) is not listed as threatened at this point.

== Taxonomy and systematics ==
Originally described by ornithologist John Gould as Amadina cincta in 1837, its specific epithet is Latin cincta may be interpreted to mean "girdled". Gould described before his visit to Australia, using a specimen deposited at the British Museum. It is placed in the Australo-Papuan finch family Estrildidae, although this family itself was previously placed in the sparrow family Passeridae.

A genetic study published in 2005 showed that it diverged from the long-tailed finch (P. acuticauda) 600,000 years ago.

"Black-throated finch" has been designated as the official common name for the species by the International Ornithologists' Union (IOC). Parson finch is an alternative common name.

=== Subspecies ===
Two subspecies of the black-throated finch have been described, with intermediate forms between the two found in an intergrade region.

- The black-rumped subspecies, Poephila cincta atropygialis, (also known as the northern subspecies, or Northern black-throated finch) is found north of Cairns and is possibly extending its range southwards. This subspecies was described by Silvester Diggles in a report on Australian birds published first in the Brisbane Courier in 1876, and reprinted in the Transactions of the Queensland Philosophical Society.
- The white-rumped subspecies, Poephila cincta cincta, (also known as the southern subspecies, or Southern black-throated finch) is found south of Townsville.
- A third subspecies, Poephila cincta vinotincta, has been acknowledged following the description published by G. M. Mathews in 1912 (Alisteranus cinctus vinotincta). which authorities may recognise or regard as a synonym for the nominate P. cincta cincta.

== Description ==
Measuring around 10 cm (4 in) in length, the black-throated finch has a short black bill, lores, and throat, sharply delineated from the rest of the pale grey head. The wings, breast and belly are pale pinkish brown, and the short tail is black, while the rump is black in northern forms and white in southern.

The vocalisation of P. cincta is comparable to that of the sister species Poephila acuticauda, although lower in tone and slightly less simple in the harmonic structures. Up to twelve calls have been identified, and the structure and tone of these is also distinguishable by subspecies.

== Distribution and habitat ==
The black-throated finch was traditionally found from Cape York south through eastern Queensland and into north-eastern New South Wales in the vicinity of Tenterfield, however it has not been recorded in New South Wales since 1994. It is sedentary or locally nomadic. It is found in grassy open forested habitats, generally near bodies of water, such as rivers.

== Behaviour and ecology ==
The black-throated finch is found in flocks of up to 30 birds. The behaviour is similar to that of the longtail Poephila acuticauda, close pair bonds that are isolated or associating in loose groups of six or more pairs. They forage in a range that centres on the nest site, which is used for breeding or for roosting outside of the maternity season. Local and seasonal conditions may cause to pairs to join congregations at limited resources, food and especially water, and they may join large flocks to travel to water sources during drought.

=== Breeding ===
Breeding may occur from September to January in the southern parts of its range, and after the monsoon season in February onwards in the north. One or two broods are laid during this time. The nest is a round structure woven from dried grasses with tube-like entrance placed high in a eucalypt 5 metres above the ground. Four to six matte white oval eggs are laid, measuring 12 x 17 mm.

=== Feeding ===
The black-throated finch primarily eats seed from various species of grass, and also eats spiders and ants. They forage at the ground for fallen seeds of native plants, their primary diet, and select these ones after the other. As with some other estrildids, they have also been observed harvesting seed still attached to the plant. They may also occasionally bend the stem down, perhaps clasping it against the ground with their foot, to reach and select seeds from the seed-heads. Larger flocks may form to feed at recently burnt sites. The species also hunt termites who are flying during the breeding season, capturing them as they trail along the ground or when they are in flight; the immature finches eventually learns to shake the wings off before consumption. Spiders are plucked from their webs for an occasional supplement to their staple diet.

They are able to suck water by partially opening and immersing their bill, drinking in the morning or evening unless the water is readily available.

== Relationship with humans ==
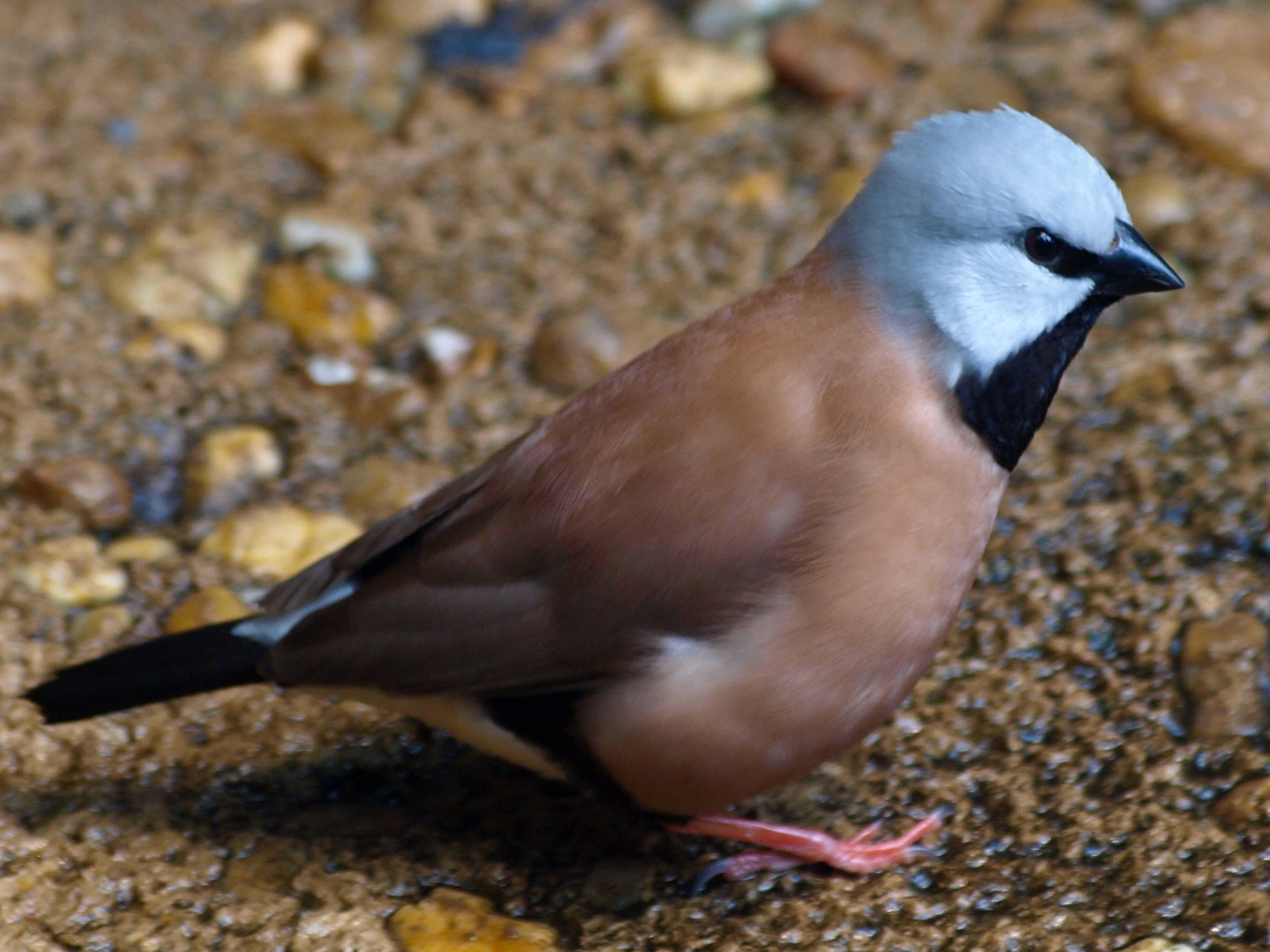
A captive individual of the white-rumped subspecies, P. c. atropygialis

The species breeds and survives readily in captivity. In 2019 it won Australian Bird of the Year in an online poll run by The Guardian Australia. It was propelled to first place over concerns of the rarity of its southern subspecies, which was down to 800 individuals as of the poll.

== Conservation status ==
For the past few decades, the population of this species has declined. While the northern subspecies (black-rumped, Poephila cincta atropygialis) has a status of "Least concern" under Queensland's Nature Conservation Act 1992, the Commonwealth status of the southern subspecies (Poephila cincta cincta) under the Environment Protection and Biodiversity Conservation Act 1999 is "Endangered". The reason for the decline in population is probably due to the spread of pastoralism, changes in fire regime, and increases in the density of native woody weeds in grassy savannahs.

A national management plan was published in 2004 by the New South Wales and Queensland governments, but records of the population density in the southern areas of its range showed declines in observed numbers from moderately common or abundant, to assessments as locally extinct or very rare by 2012.

=== NSW ===
The southern subspecies (Poephila cincta cincta) was first declared threatened in New South Wales, and in 2016 listed as "species presumed extinct" in Part 4 of Schedule 1 of the Threatened Species Conservation Act 1995. It put the extinction down to loss of habitat.

=== Queensland ===
The southern subspecies was listed as vulnerable in Queensland in 2007, having appeared to have vanished from 80% of its former range. By 2008, much of the remaining population was located near Townsville, and there were issues with development encroaching on suitable habitat. In 2020, the bird was listed as "Endangered" in Queensland, under the Nature Conservation Act 1992, and was ranked as high priority under the Department of Science "Back on Track" species prioritisation framework.

Adani Australia produced a management plan for the finch in November 2018, as the proposed Carmichael coal mine covers some of its range. It was approved in 2019 ahead of the project construction. The plan was heavily criticised by ecologists, who highlighted the plan to graze cattle on protected land and noted the land was tagged to be used for other projects. There was also criticism of a lack of transparency and consultation with experts in the field.
