= Shiploader =

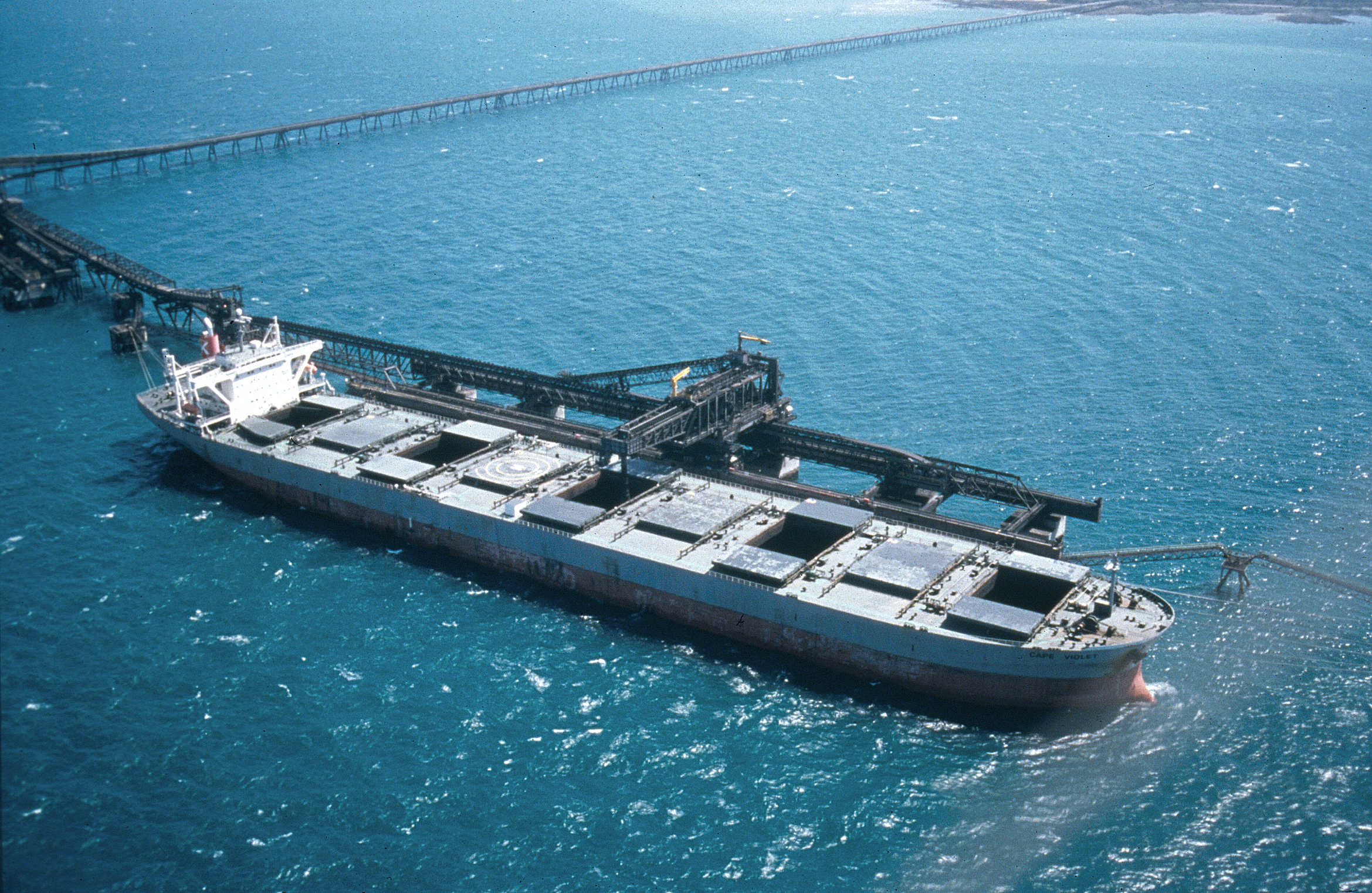
Shiploader for iron ore in Western Australia

A shiploader is a large machine used for continuously loading bulk solid materials such as iron ore, coal, fertilizers, grains and/or material in bags onto ships or barges. These machines are located in ports and jetties to facilitate bulk material exportation. Generally shiploaders are engineered to suit specific project requirements. Those requirements often include: port design, material characteristics, loading capacity, vessel type, local law, and budgetary limitations. A shiploader mainly consists of a central column, an extendable arm or boom, a belt conveyor extending out of the boom structure, a slewing mechanism, and a loading chute to transfer product from a source conveyor or feeder. The boom can move front and back, up and down by separate drives so that it can fill the whole breadth of the ship hold and adapt to the ships increasing draught while it is loaded.

The shiploader is essential to the global shipping industry. Globalization has promoted the need for international maritime ports to be equipped with efficient and durable shiploading machinery able to a handle the great variety of materials that enter into harbors within short time frames. This need for efficiency of loading and unloading has promoted advances in shiploader technologies. There are two main types of shiploaders, stationary and mobile. The distinguishing element between the two is portability versus immovability.

== Stationary shiploaders ==
Most shiploaders are stationary installations. Relative simplicity of structure combined with initial lower acquisition and maintenance costs are the greatest advantages of the stationary shiploaders. Stationary shiploaders operate within the confines of the wharf length; no costly redesign of wharf length is required. This setup comes at a cost however; the greatest disadvantages lie in its operating costs and operating efficiency. Being a fixed apparatus, the stationary shiploader requires that the vessel itself be moved then secured relative to the shiploader to allow filling of each of the different cargo holds. This process exposes the ship and the docking structure to the hazard of accidental collisions. The movement of the ship for each of the holds is both time and manpower consuming, which results in a costly low average loading rate.

== Mobile shiploaders ==
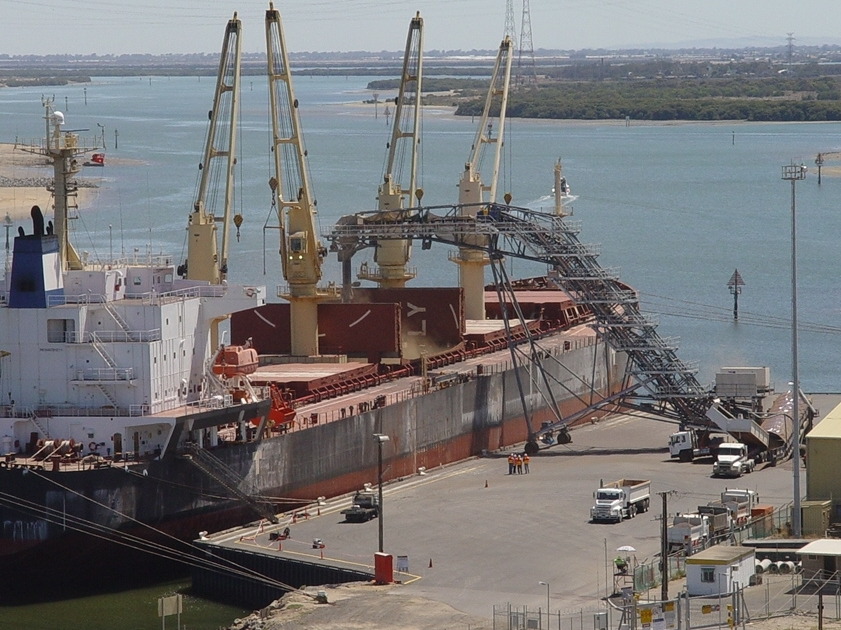
High-angle sandwich belt type shiploader.

There are two standard types of mobile shiploaders available: the partially mobile, rail-travelling shiploader and the fully mobile, wheel mounted shiploader. Both types of mobile shiploaders benefit from portability of design. This design creates a loading process much less complicated than the stationary shiploader because both rail-travelling and wheel mounted mobile shiploaders reach all ship holds for loading without the movement of the vessel. This process also significantly reduces operating costs in the form of both time expended and manpower required. The disadvantage of the mobile shiploaders is found in its space requirements. Mobile shiploaders generally require either a substantial existing wharf site length or the necessity of a wharf length extension.

The quantifying difference between the two mobile shiploaders is that the rail-travelling shiploader is relegated to linear rail lines installed along the length of the wharf, whereas the wheel mounted mobile shiploader allows for free movement. Rail-traveling loaders require the added expense of the purchase and installation of dock railings. Wheel mounted mobile shiploaders offer access to the vessel not limited by rail tracks. This increased mobility increases accessibility and flexibility. In addition, integrated tow hitches enable the storage of the unit away from the quayside when not in use.
