= GVK Industries =

Indian conglomerate company

GVK Industries Limited
- Type: Private
- Industry: Conglomerate
- Founded: 20 April 2005; 21 years ago
- Founder: G. V. Krishna Reddy
- Headquarters: Hyderabad, Telangana
- Number of locations: India, Australia, Indonesia,
- Key people: G. V. Krishna Reddy (Chairman); G. V. Sanjay Reddy (Vice-Chairman); A. Issac George (CFO)
- Products: Energy; Resources; Airports; Transportation
- Revenue: ▲₹31.363 billion (US$330 million)(2015)
- Number of employees: 50,000 (2017)
- Website: https://www.gvk.com/

GVK Industries Limited is an Indian conglomerate headquartered in Hyderabad with interests in several sectors, including energy, airports, hospitality, transportation, real estate, pharmaceuticals, and technology. After acquiring Australian coal mines in Queensland for US$1.26 billion, GVK forecasts an investment of US$10 billion in mine, rail, and port projects. Its flagship company, GVK Power & Infrastructure Limited, is listed on both the Bombay Stock Exchange (BSE) and the National Stock Exchange (NSE) as GVKPIL .

== Businesses ==
=== Energy ===
GVK's energy portfolio comprises CCPP (gas/naphtha-based), thermal (coal-based), and hydropower plants.

==== Projects under operation ====
- 469 MW Gautami CCPP, Andhra Pradesh, commenced operations in 2009.
- 228 MW Jegurupadu CCPP Phase 2 (228 MW), Andhra Pradesh, commenced operations in 2009.
- 330 MW Srinagar HEP, Uttarakhand, commenced operations in 2015.
- The 540 MW Goindwal Sahib Thermal Power Project, Punjab, commenced operations in 2016.

==== Projects under construction and development ====
- 850 MW Ratle Hydro Electric Project, Jammu and Kashmir

=== Resources ===
==== Coal ====
Australia:

GVK has secured a 79% stake each in Alpha Coal and Alpha West Coal mines and a 100% stake in Kevin's Corner mines in Queensland, Australia, for US$1.26 billion, with total resources of about 8 billion tonnes and a capacity of over 80 million tonbes per annum. When combined, these projects will create one of the largest coal mining operations in the world. GVK has also acquired 100% stake in a 500 km rail line and a 60 million tons per annum port as part of the ‘pit-to-port’ logistics solution. the project proposes a total investment of US$10 billion. This acquisition was awarded as “Asia Deal of the Year” and “Asia Outbound Investor of the Year” at the 8th Asia Mining Awards 2012, Singapore. GVK has received all pertinent approvals having reference to mine, rail and port projects from both the State and Federal Government and is in the culminating stages of project development. .

=== Airports ===
==== India ====
GVK's thrust into the aviation sector set about with the modernization of Chhatrapati Shivaji International Airport (CSIA) in Mumbai. Further, with the acquisition of Kempegowda International Airport (KIA) in Bengaluru, GVK had once become one of the largest airport operators in the country handling a combined traffic of over 60 mppa at these two airports.

Between 2016 and 2018, GVK sold its stake in Bengaluru International Airport Limited (BIAL) to Fairfax India. In 2021, GVK sold its operations at Mumbai International Airport Limited (MIAL) to the Adani Group.

==== Indonesia ====
GVK has collaborated with the Airports Authority of Indonesia, Angkasa Pura Airports (AP1), for operations, management and development of non-aeronautical commercial services at Denpasar International Airport, Bali. GVK is also developing an International greenfield airport in Yogyakarta, Special Region of Yogyakarta.

=== Transportation ===
Roads:

GVK's Jaipur – Kishangarh Expressway, Rajasthan, the first privately operated six-lane road project with 542.4 lane km. GVK's road portfolio encompasses other projects of over 900 lane km under various stages of construction and development:

==== Projects under operation ====
- Jaipur – Kishangarh Expressway (542.4 lane km), Rajasthan
- Deoli – Kota Expressway (332.16 lane km), Rajasthan

==== Projects under construction and development ====
- Badodara – Vasad Expressway (611.4 lane km), Gujarat

=== Ports ===
- GVK has signed an MoU with the Government of Gujarat, to develop a greenfield port at Okha.

=== Hospitality ===
GVK has seven TAJGVK properties across Hyderabad, Chandigarh, Chennai and Mumbai having a total key base of 1372. These include Taj Krishna, Taj Deccan, Taj Banjara and Vivanta by Taj Group in Hyderabad; Taj Chandigarh, Taj Clubhouse in Chennai and Taj Santacruz in Mumbai. It is also coming up with the Ginger brand in Andhra Pradesh to cater to the value segment.
