= Train reporting number (Australia) =

System used for identifying trains in Australia

Train reporting numbers are used on Australian railway networks to help network operators, and other users, coordinate train movements and identify trains. The numbers are used similarly to airline flight numbers, and enable a train to be identified to network controllers and other relevant authorities, and are also used by train operators for internal train management purposes.

Although Australian train reporting number systems are based on the United Kingdom system, each state has developed its own numbering system, with some similarities and differences. They generally include an indication of an origin and/or destination of a train, but differ in the way they denote the various features of the train, such as the operator, the type of train, the type of load, and whether the train is travelling in an up or down direction.

To date, there has been no significant move towards standardisation of the numbering system.

== National (ARTC) ==
The national interstate network is managed by the Australian Rail Track Corporation (ARTC), which uses a system-wide train reporting number (comprising letters and numbers) to identify trains operating on its network. The train operating number is different depending on the designated part of the network on which the train is operating. These include the Interstate Network, the Heavy Haul (Hunter Valley Coal) Network, and the ARTC-managed lines within state boundaries (Intrastate Networks). Passenger trains are sometimes numbered differently. Other systems are used for specific circumstances, such as light engines, maintenance trains, or heritage trains.

=== Interstate network numbering ===
The interstate network connects all main capital cities and uses a four-character numbering system, which applies to both freight and passenger trains.

First Digit (Day of Departure)	Second Digit (Origin)	Third Digit (Destination)	Fourth Digit (Order of Departure)
1 = Sunday; 2 = Monday; 3 = Tuesday; 4 = Wednesday; 5 = Thursday; 6 = Friday; 7 = Saturday	A = Adelaide; B = Brisbane; C = Junee/Cootamundra/Griffith; D = Darwin; F = Mudgee/Dubbo/Cowra; G = Parkes; H = Hunter Valley; J = Victoria North East; K = Victoria North West; L = Alice Springs; M = Melbourne; N = Newcastle; O = Fisherman Islands; P = Perth; Q = Moree; R = Port Pirie; S = Sydney; T = Taree – Murwillumbah; U = Broken Hill; V = Goulburn/Moss Vale/Canberra; W = NSW South Coast; X = Spencer Junction/Port Augusta; Y = Whyalla	A = Adelaide; B = Brisbane; C = Junee/Cootamundra/Griffith; D = Darwin; F = Mudgee/Dubbo/Cowra; G = Parkes; H = Hunter Valley; J = Victoria North East; K = Victoria North West; L = Alice Springs; M = Melbourne; N = Newcastle; O = Fisherman Islands; P = Perth; Q = Moree; R = Port Pirie; S = Sydney; T = Taree – Murwillumbah; U = Broken Hill; V = Goulburn/Moss Vale/Canberra; W = NSW South Coast; X = Spencer Junction/Port Augusta; Y = Whyalla	Sequentially allocated based on order of departure Number 8 is reserved for passenger services

=== Heavy haul network numbering ===
The Heavy Haul network covers both the Hunter Valley Coal network and other coal traffic in NSW.

==== Hunter Valley Coal Network ====
The Hunter Valley Coal network is one of the largest haulage networks in Australia. It uses a five-character numbering system but with three groupings of numbers to describe the train.

First and Second Digits (Load/Unload point)	Third and Fourth Digit (Destination)	Fifth Digit (Loaded Status)
AH = Ashton; AS = Austar; AT = Macquarie Generation Antiene; BC = Bulga Coal; BE = Boggabri East; BF = Bloomfield; BG = Bengalla; BO = Boggabri Coal Loading Loop; BW = Mount Arthur; CW = Camberwell; DK = Dartbrook; DR = Drayton; DS = Donaldson/Bloomfield; DU = Duralie; ER = Eraring Power Station; GD = Gunnedah; HV = Hunter Valley; JU = Wambo/United; JW = Wambo/Jerry Plains; LD = Liddell Power Station; MB = Maules Creek; MN = Mangoola; MO = Mount Owen; MP = Mount Pleasant; MR = Moolarben; MT = Mount Thorley Bin 2 MW = Warkworth Bin 2 NA = Donaldson/Bloomfield (Southern); NB = Narrabri; ND = Newdell; NM = Macquarie Generation; NW = Newstan; PW = Port Waratah; RB = Muswellbrook; RC = Rixs Creek; RV = Ravensworth; SF = Stratford; TB = Teralba; UL = Ulan; VP = Vales Point Power Station; WC = Werris Creek; WG = Wilpinjong; WH = Whitehaven Coal; WK = Warkworth Bin 1 WS = Walsh Point	100, 200, 300 Series = servicing the two Port Waratah Coal Services (PWCS) terminals in Kooragang and Morandoo; 400, 800 Series = Sydney Trains services 500 Series = Gunnedah Basin services 600 Series = North Coast services 700 Series = Macquarie Generation services 900 Series = National Coal Infrastructure Group (NCIG) terminal on Kooragang Island	Odd Number = Empty train Even Number = Loaded Train

==== South and West Coal Network ====
The South and West Coal network serves those mines not part of the Hunter Valley network, including those in the Central West and the Illawarra. It uses a slightly different five-character numbering system.

First and Second Digits (Load/Unload point)	Third and Fourth Digit (Sequential order of Departure)	Fifth Digit (Loaded Status)
AR = Airly; BB = Baal Bone; CA = Clarence; CB = Charbon; CC = Coal Cliff; CG = Cringila BHP; IH = Inner Harbour; LS = Lidsdale; LG = Lithgow; MC = Metropolitan Colliery; TM = Tahmoor Colliery; TL = Thirroul; WW = Wallerawang	From (time) 00:01 to 06:00 - Train numbers between 00 and 25; From 06:01 to 12:00 - Train numbers between 26 and 50; From 12:01 to 18:00 - Train numbers between 51 and 75; From 18:01 to 24:00 - Train numbers between 76 and 99	Odd Number = Empty train Even Number = Loaded Train

=== Intrastate network numbering ===
The ARTC operates a number of branch lines within state boundaries. These are often standard gauge lines that would otherwise be isolated, or important lines that connect different parts of the ARTC network but are not part of the Interstate or Heavy Haul networks. Depending on the line, different numbering systems are used depending on the state in which the line is located. These systems are often based on the one used by the state's own rail operator. For example, the line numbering system used in NSW is similar to the ARTC system used on NSW networks. (Refer to the state numbering systems below.)

=== Other numbering ===
Other systems are used for passenger trains, light engines, maintenance trains or heritage trains. They are detailed in the relevant Train Operating Manual, but are consistent with those used in the numbering systems of the state's own rail operator.

== New South Wales ==
There are two other rail network administrators in New South Wales: UGL for the Country Rail Network, and Sydney Trains for the metropolitan network bounded by Berowra, Emu Plains, Macarthur and Waterfall. Source for all information in this section:

=== NSW Country Rail Network ===
The NSW Country Rail Network numbering system is a continuation of the system developed over time by the NSW Government Railways and its successors. It is currently managed by UGL, though numbering remains the property of Transport for NSW.

Train numbers on the NSW Country Rail Network use a four-number system for freight trains.

First Digit (Origin)	Second Digit (Destination)	Third Digit (Operator)	Fourth Digit (Up or Down)
1 = Sydney Trains Network; 2 = Goulburn; 3 = Junee; 4 = Newcastle; 5 = Werris Creek; 6 = North Coast; 7 = Lithgow – Merrygoen; 8 = Orange; 9 = Illawarra	1 = Sydney Trains Network; 2 = Goulburn; 3 = Junee; 4 = Newcastle; 5 = Werris Creek; 6 = North Coast; 7 = Lithgow – Merrygoen; 8 = Orange; 9 = Illawarra	00 – 09 = Sydney Trains (Freight); 10 – 19 = Qube; 20 – 39 = Pacific National; 40 – 49 = Southern Shorthaul Railroad; 50 – 59 = Aurizon; 60 – 69 = Qube; 70 – 79 = Southern Shorthaul Railroad; 80 – 89 = Freightliner Australia; 90 – 99 = Sydney Rail Services	Odd numbers - Down trains Even numbers - Up trains

As with the national system, there are specific numbers for passenger trains, heritage trains and maintenance/inspection trains. Interstate trains and coal network trains are numbered as per the National Interstate network numbering above.

=== Metropolitan Network ===
Within the Sydney Trains Network, normal, in-service (passenger) services are assigned numbers consisting of four alpha-numeric characters. The number is made up of a 'run' identifier and followed by a 'trip' identifier. A train will generally keep the same 'run' identifier for the whole day and increment its 'trip' identifier. The 'run' identifier is a 1-3 digit number, with dashes (-) added to make it 3 characters long. The numbers are generally allocated in blocks by scheduled train class. For example, as of October 2019, 1-22 are allocated to B sets. An exception is the Olympic Park line, which has alpha-numeric 'run' identifiers, with the first letter representing its destination (S=Sydney Central, B=Blacktown, L=Lidcombe). The 'trip' identifier is one character, or one for shorter lines, such as the Olympic Park line. The whole train reporting number is officially referred to as the 'run number'.

Examples of Sydney Trains Run Numbers
Example	'Run' Identifier	'Trip' Identifier	Meaning
1--A	1	A	First trip of the day for train allocated run 1
15-B	15	B	Second trip of the day for train allocated run 15
48AC	48	AC	Third trip of the day for train allocated run 48
133D	133	D	Fourth trip of the day for train allocated run 133
L2AE	L2	AE	Fifth trip of the day for train allocated run L2 (shuttle service between Olympic Park and Lidcombe)

The interurban/intercity (NSW TrainLink) network is slightly less organised, with no link between each successive run performed by a train. Train numbers are four characters, beginning with a one/two letter prefix, followed by numbers. The letter identifies which region the train is operating in:

Prefix	Stands for	Lines
N	North	Central Coast & Newcastle Line
V		Hunter Line
C	Coast	South Coast Line - Trains to/from Sydney
K	Kembla	South Coast - Trains to/from Coalcliff (usually empty)
KN	Kiama-Nowra	South Coast - Kiama to Bomaderry (Nowra) Diesel Service
W	West	Blue Mountains Line
SN	Southern	Southern Highlands Line
H		Interurban trains running empty within suburban network

=== Heritage Operated Trains ===
Within the ARTC, Sydney Trains and Country Regional Networks, services operated by accredited Heritage Rail organisations have a unique four-digit train number that identifies the individual operator and the type of motive power deployed in the train consist. Numbering uses a convention of NANN.

First Digit (Operator)	Second Digit (Motive Power)	Third Digit	Fourth Digit (Up or Down)
4 = Lithgow State Mine Railway; 5 = East Coast Heritage Rail; 6 = Transport Heritage NSW; 7 = Rail Motor Society; 8 = Lachlan Valley Railway; 9 = Sydney Rail Services	D = Diesel Loco (Light Engine); E = Electric Loco; L = Diesel Loco; R = Diesel Multiple Units and Rail Motors; S = Steam Loco; X = Electric Loco (Light Engine); Z = Steam Loco (Light Engine)	0 to 9	0, 2, 4, 6, 8 (even numbers) = Up Trains; 1, 3, 5, 7, 9 (odd numbers) = Down Trains

Train movements comprising mixed locomotives that include Electric locomotive(s) are to use the letter "E” to avoid the possibility of electric locomotive being turned onto unwired roads, or sections of track from which the current has been removed. This will apply with the pantographs in the raised or lowered positions.

Heritage services retain their original number for the entire journey even when travelling in the Up or Down direction.

NSW based Heritage Operated services use this train numbering system when working on the ARTC Network in Victoria and South Australia.

== Victoria ==
Weekly Notice 4/77 (25 January 1977) advised that the "Train Describer Numbering System" was to be introduced. Originally introduced for trains in the Melbourne suburban area, it was being used state-wide by 1981. It is a four-digit system, and all trains in Victoria are allocated a train number for use in the radio communications system.

The following is a summary of how the system works.

First Digit (Origin)	Second Digit (Destination)	Third and Fourth Digit (Up or Down)
0 = City Circle, shunts, docks, light locomotives and any train not described here (see notes); 1 = Mernda and Hurstbridge (Clifton Hill Group); 2 = Alamein and Glen Waverley (Burnley Group); 3 = Belgrave and Lilydale (Burnley Group); 4 = Cranbourne, Pakenham and Frankston (Caulfield Group); 5 = Upfield and Cragieburn (Northern Group); 6 = Watergardens, Williamstown and Werribee (Northern Group); 7 = Special (used on a day-to-day basis); 8 = Country Passenger Trains; 9 = Goods Trains; R = Showgrounds and Flemington Racecourse; X = Sandringham	Electric trains 0-5 = Flinders Street direct or local shuttle services 6-9 = Trains operating via the underground loop Passenger and Goods trains 0 = Bendigo, Swan Hill, Echuca and beyond 1 = Ballarat, Maryborough, Mildura, Pinnaroo, Kulwin, Robinvale and area (inc Geelong - Ballarat); 2 = Geelong, Warrnambool Via Werribee (Only freight & special trains use this now), Melton & Bacchus Marsh 3 = North East Broad Gauge (Seymour, Albury, Tocumwal, Echuca via Toolamba); 4 = Eastern (Bairnsdale); 5 = Long Island, Stony Point and Metropolitan; 6 = North East Standard Gauge (Melbourne - Albury); 7 = Western Standard Gauge (Melbourne – Wolseley) and standard gauge branches, Hopetoun, Yaapeet, and Portland; Geelong, South Geelong, Marshall & Waurn Ponds via Wyndham Vale. 8 = Through standard gauge trains (Albury - Wolseley and v/v); Geelong, South Geelong, Marshall & Waurn Ponds (After all 87xx have been used up) Wyndham Vale, Warrnambool 9 = not used	Even numbers = Up or Through trains Odd numbers = Down trains

Notes
1. Maroona to Portland is Up
2. Through trains sometimes retain their number, e.g.:
9080 - Geelong to Swan Hill via Tottenham
9280 - Swan Hill to Geelong via Tottenham
In this case the 2nd digit is the destination line, so for the journey before Tottenham the train has a different 2nd digit for the corridor it is running on.
3. In addition to the second digit for electric trains indicating whether it runs via the underground loop, it can also be used to work out which line the train runs on (in addition to the first digit telling you what group of lines the train is on).

Direct	City Loop	Line
1000 - 1199	1600 - 1799	Mernda
1200 - 1399	1800 - 1999	Hurstbridge
2000 - 2199	2600 - 2799	Glen Waverley
2200 - 2399	2800 - 2899	Alamein
3000 - 3199	3600 - 3769	Belgrave
3200 - 3399	3800 - 3999	Lilydale
3400 - 3499	3770 - 3799	Blackburn
3500 - 3599		Empty Cars, Lilydale and Belgrave
4000 - 4099	4600 - 4699	Pakenham
4100 - 4199	4700 - 4799	Cranbourne
4200 - 4249		Pakenham (shuttles)
4250 - 4299		Cranbourne (shuttles)
4300 - 4399	4800 - 4899	Frankston
4450 - 4499		Empty Cars, Cranbourne and Pakenham
4500 - 4599		Empty Cars, Frankston and locals
5000 - 5199	5600 - 5799	Broadmeadows
5200 - 5399	5800 - 5999	Upfield
6000 - 6099	6600 - 6799	Sydenham
6200 - 6399		Williamstown (shuttles)
6400 - 6499	6800 - 6999	Werribee

4. The following special train numbers are used in certain circumstances
0000 - 0000 Movements not described
0001 - 0100 Light Locomotives
0101 - 0150 Light Locomotives to/from West Tower via Engine Flyover
0151 - 0199 Light Locomotives to/from West Tower -undescribed
0200 - 0239 Special Country Trains in suburban area (used on day-to-day basis)
0240 - 0499 Pilots in the Spencer Street Area
0500 - 0599 Light locos (in connection with metropolitan freight train movements)
0601 - 0699 Docks and shunts at out stations
0700 - 0799 City Circle (anti clockwise)
0800 - 0899 City Circle (clockwise)
0900 - 0999 Standby Trains

=== ARTC Victorian standard gauge intrastate trains ===
The ARTC has a specific numbering system for trains operating on the ARTC Standard Gauge network within Victoria that do not run into South Australia or New South Wales.

Character	Description
NNNNA	First Character – The district in which the train commenced: 1-4 / Not ARTC Network; 5 / Metropolitan broad gauge; 6 / Allocated to North East (standard gauge) (Melbourne – Albury, Benalla – Oaklands); 7 / Allocated to Western (standard gauge) (Melbourne – Wolseley, Maroona – Portland); 9 / Metropolitan standard gauge
NNNNA	Second character – The district in which the train will finish its journey: 1-4 / Not ARTC Network; 5 / Metropolitan broad gauge; 6 / Allocated to North East (standard gauge) (Melbourne – Albury, Benalla – Oaklands); 7 / Allocated to Western (standard gauge) (Melbourne – Wolseley, Maroona – Portland); 9 / Metropolitan standard gauge
NNNNA	Third character – Any odd or even number not already used
NNNNA	Fourth character Odd numbers = Down trains, away from Melbourne (or Portland to Maroona) Even numbers = Up trains, towards Melbourne (or Maroona to Portland)
NNNNA	Fifth character V = Operating within Victoria

== South Australia/Northern Territory ==
The Adelaide–Darwin railway and branch lines in South Australia are administered by Aurizon. For the Adelaide–Darwin Railway, the numbering system used resembles the ARTC one, but there are differences in some of the lettering conventions.

First Digit (Day of Departure)	Second Digit (Origin)	Third Digit (Destination)	Fourth Digit (Order of Departure)
1 = Sunday; 2 = Monday; 3 = Tuesday; 4 = Wednesday; 5 = Thursday; 6 = Friday; 7 = Saturday	A = Adelaide; D = Darwin; H = Katherine; L = Alice Springs; M = Muckaty; T = Tennant Creek U = Union Reef	A = Adelaide; D = Darwin; H = Katherine; L = Alice Springs; M = Muckaty; T = Tennant Creek U = Union Reef	Sequentially allocated based on order of departure

Branch lines are numbered in a manner consistent with the Victorian and NSW Intrastate train numbering systems.

First Digit (Origin)	Second Digit (Destination)	Third Digit (Filler digit)	Fourth Digit (Up or Down)	Fifth Digit (South Australia only)
1 = Dry Creek to Keswick, Pelican Point; 2 = Beyond Keswick to SA border with Victoria; 3 = All branch lines south of the Broken Hill line 4 = Beyond Dry Creek to Port Augusta, Port Pirie, Spencer Junction; 5 = Crystal Brook East Junction to Broken Hill; 6 = Beyond Spencer Junction to Whyalla; 7 = All branch lines north of the Broken Hill line and east of the Darwin line 8 = Beyond Spencer Junction to SA border on line to Perth; 9 = Beyond Tarcoola to SA border on line to Darwin	1 = Dry Creek to Keswick, Pelican Point; 2 = Beyond Keswick to SA border with Victoria; 3 = All branch lines south of the Broken Hill line 4 = Beyond Dry Creek to Port Augusta, Port Pirie, Spencer Junction; 5 = Crystal Brook East Junction to Broken Hill; 6 = Beyond Spencer Junction to Whyalla; 7 = All branch lines north of the Broken Hill line and east of the Darwin line 8 = Beyond Spencer Junction to SA border on line to Perth; 9 = Beyond Tarcoola to SA border on line to Darwin	Any number not yet used	Odd numbers = Down trains Even numbers = Up trains	S = Train operating in South Australia only

== Western Australia ==
=== Transperth services ===
The Transperth Suburban rail system follows a standard convention, with a 4-digit number followed by two letters, to denote each service. The first number is the line, the following three being sequentially numbered, and the two letters indicating the stopping pattern. For example, 3092AS is an all stations up service on the Yanchep line, and 6065TA is an all stations down service on the Armadale/Thornlie–Cockburn line to Thornlie.

First Digit

1. Mandurah line
2. Ellenbrook line
3. Yanchep line
4. unallocated
5. Armadale line
6. Thornlie–Cockburn line
7. Fremantle line
8. Airport line
9. Midland line

Pattern Identifiers

- Common identifiers
  - xxxxAS - All Stations
- Armadale/Thornlie–Cockburn line
  - xxxxB - Express from Claisebrook to Queens Park, stopping only at Oats Street
  - xxxxC - Express from Claisebrook to Cannington, stopping only at Oats Street (also stops at Perth Stadium on Weekends, Public Holidays & for special events)
  - xxxxTA - All Stations to Thornlie (excluding Beckenham)
- Fremantle line
  - xxxxD - Commences/Terminates at Shenton Park Station
  - xxxxW - Commences/Terminates at Claremont Station
- Yanchep line
  - xxxxK - Commences/Terminates at Clarkson Station
  - xxxxW - Commences/Terminates at Whitfords Station
  - xxxxPW - Commences at Whitfords Station and Terminates at Perth Station
- Mandurah line
  - xxxxK - Commences/Terminates at Rockingham Station
  - xxxxW - Commences/Terminates at Cockburn Central Station

== See also ==
- Train reporting number (UK)
