= Antiene, New South Wales =

Antiene
- Suburb
- Coordinates: 32°19′54″S 150°59′4″E
- Country: Australia
- State: New South Wales
- Region: Hunter
- LGA: Upper Hunter Shire
- Location: 225 km (140 mi) NNW of Sydney; 112 km (70 mi) WNW of Newcastle; 14.7 km (9.1 mi) ESE of Muswellbrook

Government
  - State electorate: Upper Hunter
  - Federal division: New England
- Elevation^{Note1}: 180 m (590 ft)
- Time zone: UTC+10 (AEST)
  - Summer (DST): UTC+11 (AEDT)
- Postcode: 2333
- County: Durham
- Parish: Savoy

Antiene (also spelled Antienne) is a rural locality of the Muswellbrook Shire local government area in the Hunter Region of New South Wales, Australia. Named after County Antrim in Northern Ireland, the locality was registered as "Antiene" because the request was made in illegible handwriting.

The Main North railway line passes through the locality and is the site of a coal unloader, used to unload coal destined for the Bayswater and Liddell power stations. Until 2007, it was the site where the Main North railway became single track, the line has now been duplicated through to Muswellbrook to the north. A railway station opened at the site in 1890 and closed in 1975, no trace of this remains today.

== History ==
Antiene Post Office opened on 1 October 1906 and closed in 1965.

== Notes ==
1. Average elevation as shown on 1:100000 map 9033 MUSWELLBROOK.
