= Lake Liddell =

Lake in New South Wales, Australia

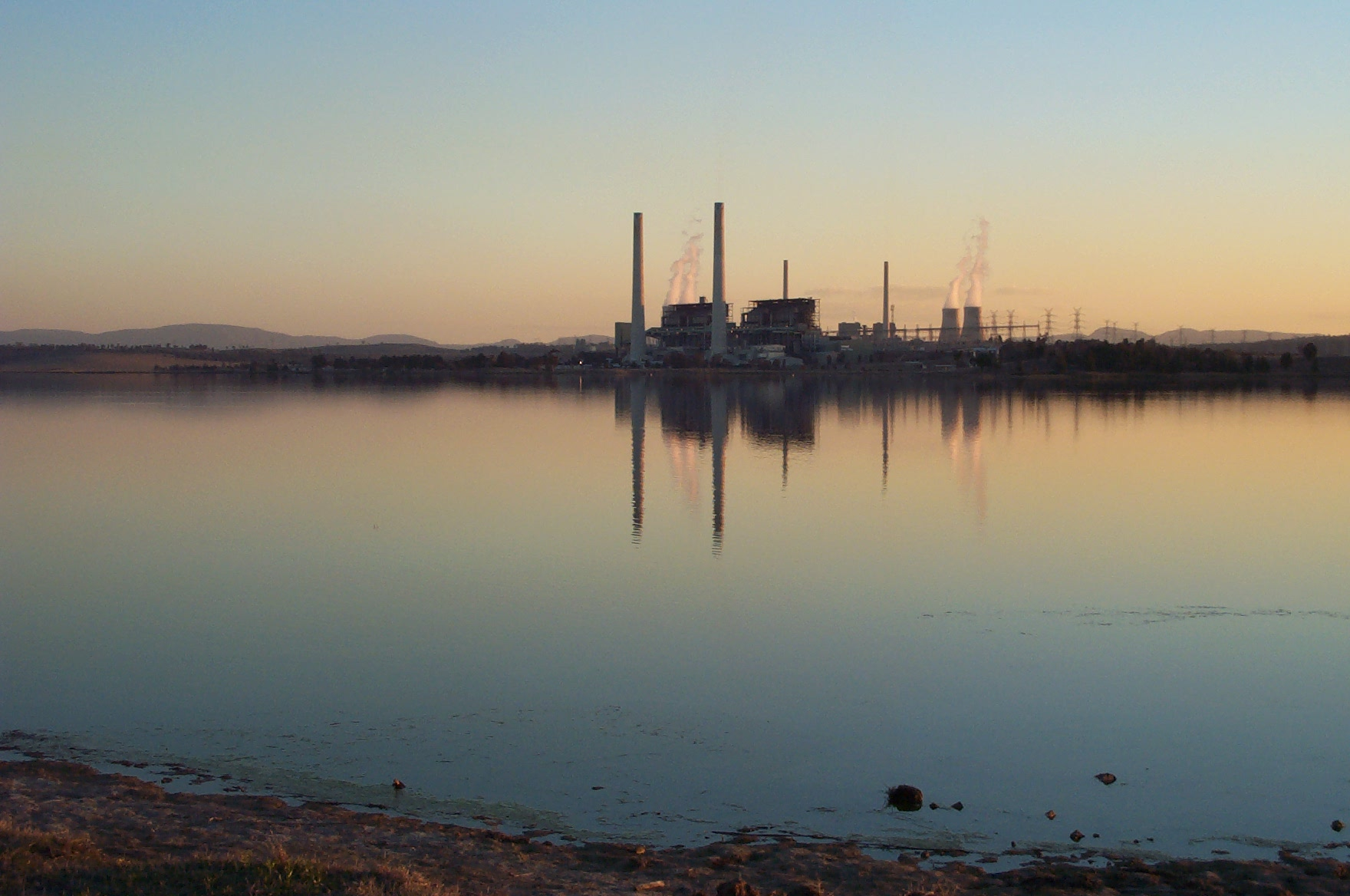
- The lake with Liddell and Bayswater power stations

- Location within New South Wales
- Location: New South Wales
- Coordinates: 32°22′S 150°59′E
- Basin countries: Australia

Lake Liddell is located between Muswellbrook and Singleton, in the Hunter Valley, New South Wales, Australia.

Lake Liddell supplied cooling water for Liddell Power Station, and was created during construction of the power station.

Lake Liddell was closed for public use in March 2016 after Naegleria fowleri, a brain-eating amoeba, was discovered in the lake. Heavy metals have been detected in Lake Liddell.
