= Grasstree railway station =

Former railway station in New South Wales, Australia

Grasstree

General information
- Location: Muscle Creek, New South Wales; Australia
- Coordinates: 32°17′16″S 150°57′54″E
- Operator: Public Transport Commission
- Line: Main North
- Distance: 281.200 kilometres from Central
- Platforms: 2 (2 side)
- Tracks: 2

Construction
- Structure type: Ground

Other information
- Status: Demolished

History
- Opened: 9 July 1877
- Closed: 29 June 1975

Services
Preceding station	Former services	Following station
Muswellbrook towards Wallangarra	Main Northern Line	Antiene towards Sydney
Location

Grasstree railway station was a railway station on the Main North line, serving the locality of Muscle Creek, New South Wales, Australia. It opened in 1877 and closed to passenger services in 1975 and was subsequently demolished. It consisted of a pair of side platforms at the site of a passing loop. No trace of the station now remains.
