= Wallan derailment =

Train derailment in Australia

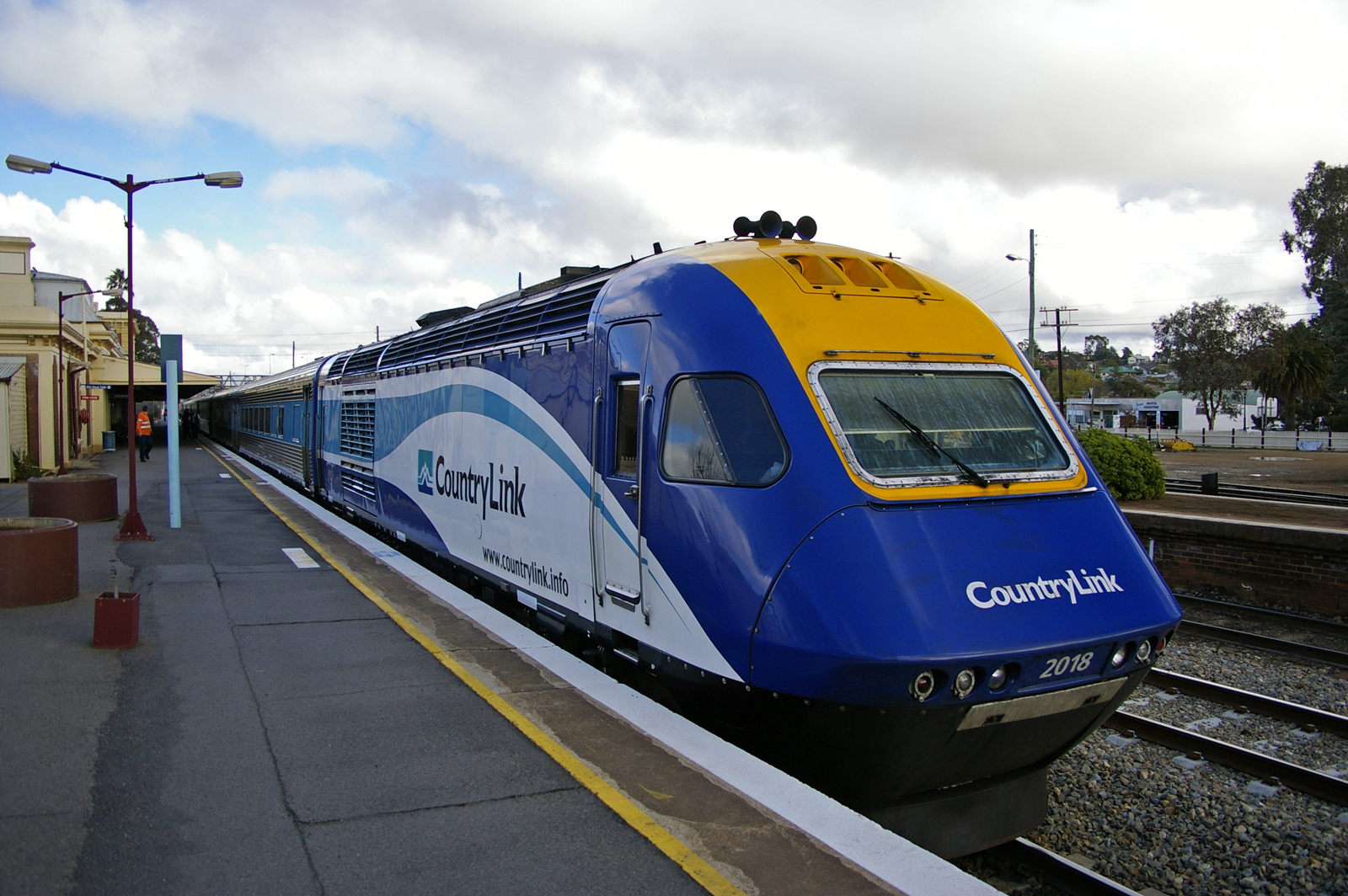
- The site, showing extensive damage to the surrounding forests XP2018, the power car that derailed in the incident, seen in 2009

Details
- Date: 20 February 2020; 19:43
- Location: Wallan, Victoria, Australia
- Coordinates: 37°24′30″S 145°00′49″E
- Line: North East
- Operator: NSW TrainLink
- Owner: Australian Rail Track Corporation
- Service: ST23 07:40 Sydney to Melbourne
- Incident type: Derailment
- Cause: Management error: Poor risk assessment procedures. Driver unaware of change of route through loop.

Statistics
- Trains: 1
- Passengers: 155
- Crew: 7
- Deaths: 2
- Injured: 61 (8 serious)
Route diagram

On 20 February 2020, a NSW TrainLink XPT passenger train derailed while passing through a turnout at Wallan, Victoria, Australia. Of the 162 total on board, there were two fatalities and 61 passengers were injured, eight of whom sustained serious injuries.

The service was running from Sydney to Melbourne and was passing through Wallan. The interim report into the accident indicated that the train was travelling at more than 115 kilometres per hour (71 mph) when it entered the turnout, which had a specified speed limit of 15 kilometres per hour (9.3 mph).

== Background ==
On 3 February 2020, a vehicle had struck overhead wiring at Wallan, leading to a fire in a signalling hut which caused extensive damage to wiring. This affected signalling on the North East line between Donnybrook and Kilmore East. Trains were signalled through the affected section using Caution Orders. On 6 February, this was changed to using Train Orders, a manual safe-working system. The points at the Wallan Loop were set to the straight ahead position and locked. No speed restriction was put in place. V/Line services in the Wallan area had been delayed in the weeks leading up to the accident due to the ongoing faults. On 20 February, trains were routed through the Wallan Loop for rail cleaning purposes. A speed limit of 15 kilometres per hour (9.3 mph) entering the loop and 35 kilometres per hour (22 mph) exiting the loop was put in place. Two V/Line trains passed through the loop before the XPT.

== Accident ==
The accident occurred at 19:43, when NSW TrainLink's 07:40 Sydney-to-Melbourne service operated by an XPT set entered a turnout near Wallan, about 45 kilometres (28 mi) north of Melbourne, and derailed. The train, comprising power car XP2018 (leading), five carriages and power car XP2000, was carrying 155 passengers and seven crew members. The train was running about two hours behind schedule at the time of the accident. As the train passed through the turnout, leading power car XP2018 and the first four carriages derailed, with one carriage and rear power car XP2000 remaining on the track. The train had entered the loop at a speed of between 114 and 127 kilometres per hour (71 and 79 mph).

The first 000 call was made at 19:45. Two people were killed: the train's driver and the pilot. Emergency services confirmed that 12 people had been taken to hospital. The injured were taken to the Kilmore Hospital, Kilmore and The Northern Hospital, Epping; one person was airlifted to the Royal Melbourne Hospital.

== Aftermath ==
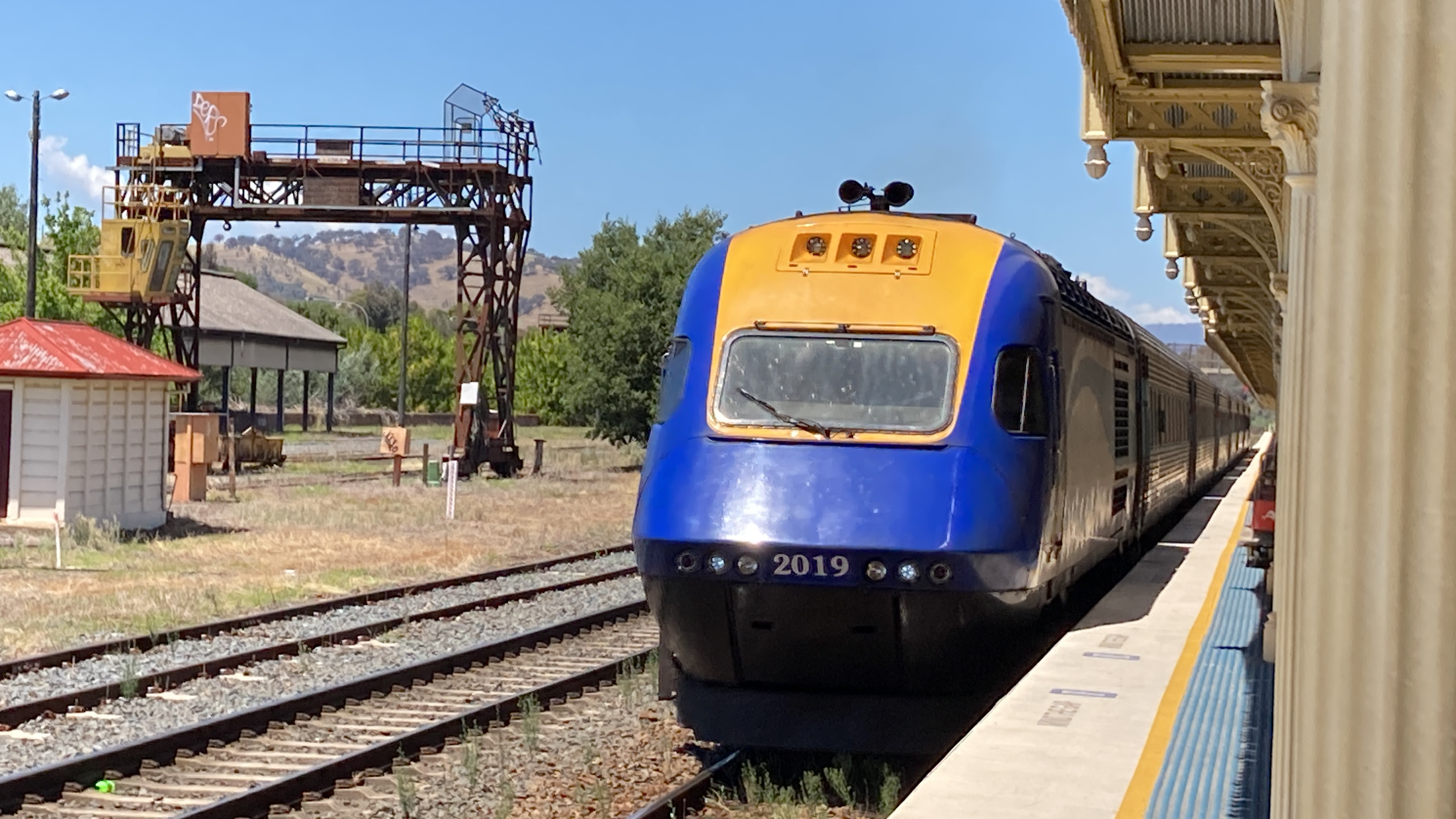
XP2018 was rebuilt as XP2019 and returned to service. This photo was taken at Albury in December 2023

The derailment caused the closure of the North East line and the adjacent broad gauge line, impacting freight services and V/Line services to Seymour, Shepparton and Albury. On 23 February, the Australian Rail Track Corporation commenced removal of the train from the rail corridor. Seymour and Shepparton V/Line services resumed on 1 March, followed by Albury services on 2 March. Major speed restrictions were in turn enforced on the North East line, with NSW TrainLink temporarily terminating services at Albury. Passengers reported that the train had been gaining speed at the time of the accident, after being stopped due to a signalling issue.

In the days preceding the accident, trains were scheduled to pass through the turnout in the straight ahead position. On that day, trains were instead diverted into a passing loop while work was carried out on the adjacent track. The Victorian branch of the Australian Rail Tram and Bus Industry Union reported that V/Line drivers were refusing to traverse through the section of track that the XPT service derailed on.

Regularly scheduled XPT services between Sydney and Melbourne resumed on 4 June. Of the two power cars, XP2000 was returned to service while XP2018 remained in store as of May 2021 at Maintrain, Auburn pending the completion of investigations.

On 24 February 2023 after being rebuilt and rail tested XP2019 (formerly XP2018) returned to revenue service operating a Sydney-to-Dubbo service. The power car was renumbered in accordance with a railway tradition of retiring the numbers of rolling stock involved in fatal accidents. Its return to service followed a rebuild and rail trial of XP2019.

== Investigations ==
=== Australian Transport Safety Bureau ===
The Australian Transport Safety Bureau (ATSB) opened an investigation into the accident on 20 February. It was led by the Victorian Government's Chief Investigator, Transport Safety, assisted by the ATSB and the New South Wales Office of Transport Safety Investigations in accordance with the Transport Safety Investigation Act 2003. The train's data logger was recovered as part of the investigation.

A preliminary report was published on 3 April. It was found that the train was travelling in excess of 100 kilometres per hour (62 mph) when it derailed. In the hours before the accident, a notice was circulated that trains on the North East line were to be routed via the Wallan passing loop, with a specified 15-kilometre-per-hour (9.3 mph) speed limit for entry into the loop. The train had approached the loop at "about the track's line speed" of 130 kilometres per hour (81 mph), and an emergency brake application was made shortly before the train entered the turnout into the passing loop.

The ATSB issued an interim report on 10 June 2021. The final report was released on 9 August 2023. The investigation concluded that the basic cause of the accident was a management error, with poor risk assessment, particularly of the change of tracks in use at the Wallan loop, meaning that the train driver was unaware that the loop was being used.

=== WorkSafe Victoria ===
WorkSafe Victoria also investigated the death of the train's pilot, a 49-year-old man from Castlemaine. In April 2024, NSW Trains and the Australian Rail Track Corporation were convicted in the Melbourne Magistrates Court and fined a total of $525,000 over the derailment.

== Bibliography ==
- Derailment of XPT ST23 Wallan, Victoria on 20 February 2020 – Preliminary (PDF) (Report). Canberra: Australian Transport Safety Bureau. 3 April 2020. RO-2020-002. Archived from the original (PDF) on 3 April 2020.
