= Nathan Tinkler =

Australian businessman (born 1976)

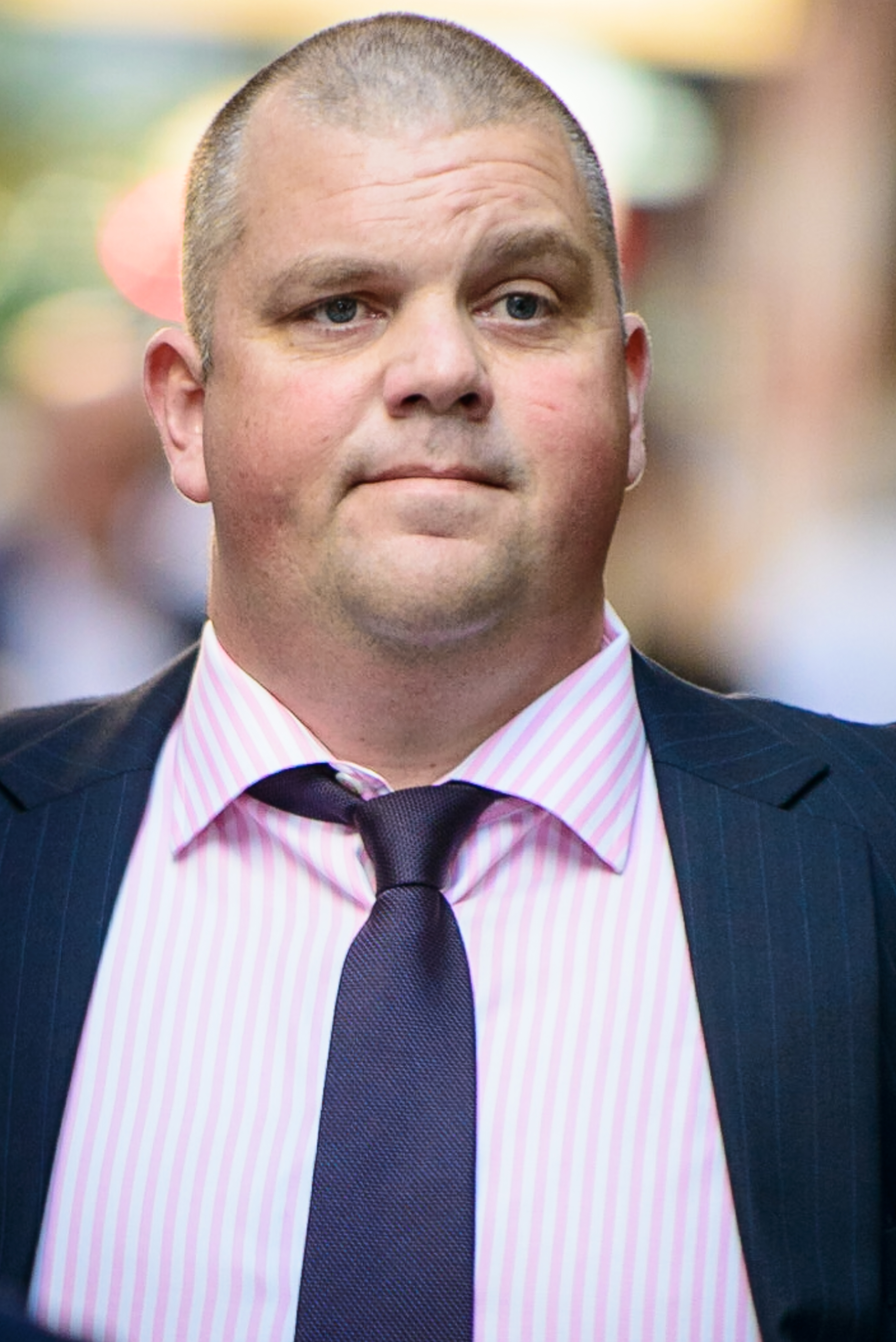
- Tinkler in 2014
- Born: 1 February 1976 (age 50); Port Macquarie, New South Wales, Australia
- Occupations: Mining Executive, electrician
- Years active: 1998−present
- Website: tinklergroup.com

Nathan Tinkler (born 1 February 1976) is an Australian mining industry executive and was previously the principal shareholder of Aston Resources and Whitehaven Coal. He started out as a mining apprentice in the Hunter Valley, in New South Wales and set up his own business at age 26. Much of his wealth was acquired from investments in the mining industry.

== Biography ==
Tinkler qualified as an electrician at the Muswellbrook TAFE and commenced his involvement in the coal industry as an apprentice electrical fitter for Bayswater Coal. At aged 26, he started his own mine machinery maintenance business called Custom Mining.

In 2006, Tinkler paid a $1 million deposit to buy the Middlemount coal mine in Central Queensland. A year later, he sold his Middlemount stake to Macarthur Coal for $275 million with the payment largely in shares. In May 2008 Tinkler sold his Macarthur shares for A$422 million in cash.

Tinkler was named by BRW magazine in September 2008 as Australia’s richest person aged 40 or less with a stated net worth of $441 million at age 32.

In 2008, Tinkler purchased the Maules Creek Mine coal deposit in New South Wales for $480 million from Rio Tinto and floated the vehicle for the deposit, Aston Resources Limited, in 2010 with a valuation of $1.2 billion.

In early 2012, Tinkler was named by BRW magazine as Australia’s youngest billionaire with a stated net worth of more than $1.18 billion.

In May 2012, Tinkler merged Aston Resources Limited and another coal mining company controlled by him, Boardwalk Resources, with Whitehaven Coal creating a leading independent coal mining company with market capitalisation in excess of $5 billion.

In June 2013, Tinkler’s shareholding in Whitehaven Coal was sold to his main financial backers.

In 2014, Tinkler was called to give evidence before the Independent Commission Against Corruption over allegations of illegal donations to New South Wales politicians. He denied any wrongdoing and no corruption finding was made against him.

Tinker was appointed Managing Director of Australian Pacific Coal Limited in 2015.

In February 2016, Tinkler was declared bankrupt by the Federal Court with his bankruptcy subsequently annulled in August 2018.

In December 2018, entities associated with Tinkler commenced proceedings in the New South Wales Supreme Court against Whitehaven Coal seeking compensation in relation to the 2012 acquisition of Boardwalk Resources Limited.

== Other business interests ==
In 2008, Tinkler established a racehorse enterprise, Patinack Farm, which became one of Australia’s largest locally owned racing organisations, experiencing tremendous success in a short period of time. This success is highlighted by eight individual Group1 winners, more than 40 stake winners and over 200 metropolitan victories.

Patinack Farm consisted of three major properties including Sandy Hollow a 3,300 acre breeding facility, a 1,000 acre training facility and stud at Canungra on the Gold Coast and 950 acres of undeveloped horse country at Monegeeta, Victoria. Patinack Farm owned as many as 600 broodmares, along with some of the highest potential stallions in Australia. Tinkler sold Patinack Farm in 2014. It was sold to a consortium of local and overseas buyers.

== Sporting interests ==
The Newcastle Jets hosted a community day at which 10,000 fans were admitted free for the clash against Melbourne Heart on 31 October 2010. Membership of the club increased to over 10,000 and the club obtained the Hunter Medical Research Institute as a new sponsor.

On 31 March 2011 Tinkler assumed ownership of the Newcastle Knights rugby league club by a landslide vote of the eligible club members. The Knights signed Wayne Bennett to a four-year coaching contract with the club, starting in 2012.

In April 2012 Tinkler handed back the Newcastle Jets A-league licence to the FFA. The Federation said that Tinkler's Hunter Sports Group could not just hand back its licence, and was breaching a binding contract by walking away from the Jets. Federation chief executive Ben Buckley refused to rule out the possibility of launching a damages claim against Tinkler that could go as high as $80 million.

In May 2015, after Newcastle Jets players and staff had not been paid for a month, Tinkler placed the Newcastle Jets into voluntary administration, listing debts of $2.7 million. That resulted in the Football Federation of Australia terminating Tinkler's A-League licence, held by Hunter Sports Group. It was the culmination of a soccer season in which the Jets recorded their worst-ever results on the way to collecting the competition's wooden spoon.

== Corruption allegations ==
At a hearing of the New South Wales Independent Commission Against Corruption (ICAC) on 28 April 2014, it was revealed that Tinkler's Patinack Farm horse stud paid $66,000 to "Eightbyfive", a slush fund set up by an advisor to the allegedly corrupt NSW politician Chris Hartcher. A few days later, text messages presented at the commission revealed that Tinkler's property development company, Buildev, had secretly paid $50,000 to produce anonymous flyers attacking Jodi McKay, the local state parliamentarian, in the lead-up to the 2011 state election, because she opposed the billion-dollar plan by Buildev to establish a coal export terminal in Newcastle.

== Financial difficulties ==
On Melbourne Cup day 2012, Tinkler's private horse racing trainer, John Thompson, revealed that Tinkler's stable of horses had been forced to go without feed because the group was unable to pay suppliers. Thompson also said that Tinkler's racing and breeding company, Patinack Farm, had been asked to leave its Hawkesbury private training facility because "the owner of the property just got sick of us being late with our rent". However a spokesman for Tinkler said Patinack Farm had never run out of feed.

In December 2012, the Australian Taxation Office filed court documents to wind up Tinkler's Hunter Sports Group. The action came two weeks after two of Tinkler's companies were placed into liquidation. Hunter Sports Group owed around A$2.7 million in unpaid taxes and was notified of this debt in September 2012.

On 18 February 2013, it was reported that the liquidator of Nathan Tinkler's private company, Patinack Farm Administration, was considering an insolvent trading claim against Tinkler and his fellow director Troy Palmer. On 2 April 2013 it was revealed that Tinkler had put his entire racing and breeding business up for sale, including stock and properties.

In May 2013, it was reported that Tinkler and his wife could be made bankrupt over A$440,000 in allegedly unpaid bills to a corporate adviser. In the same month, the BRW Rich 200 estimated that Tinkler was beset by a series of debt problems and falling asset values that devalued his 2012 net wealth of A$915 million to A$235 million.

On 19 June 2013, it was announced that Tinkler's biggest remaining asset, a 19 per cent share in coal miner Whitehaven, had been bought by his main financial backers, including Farallon Management. It was estimated that the sale price of $2.96 per share represented a substantial loss by Tinkler's backers on their loans to him. Nevertheless, the sale of his share in Whitehaven was seen as part of his struggle to repay debts accumulated by other parts of his crumbling empire. The funds raised by the sale of his Whitehaven shares enabled Tinkler to repay a $12 million debt to coal exploration company Blackwood Resources on 27 June, a day ahead of schedule.

On 3 September 2013, Tinkler's company, Aston Metals, a base metals explorer then owning five projects around Mt Isa, was placed in the hands of receivers.

On 21 May 2014, it was reported that contracts had been exchanged to sell Patinack Farm, for an undisclosed sum, to a consortium consisting of "local and overseas parties from the Middle East".

On 20 July 2015, an arrest warrant was ordered for Tinkler after he failed to appear in the Supreme Court in Adelaide to answer questions about the liquidation of his Patinack horse farm. The liquidator had taken action in the South Australian Supreme Court over unpaid debts, and asked the court to issue a warrant for Tinkler's arrest, saying he had shown a "flagrant disregard" for the court.

On 19 and 20 November of the same year, Tinkler was served with two statutory demands by the Deputy Commissioner of Taxation, alleging that his company, Aston Resources Investments, owed $6.4 million in tax, and that Tinkler Group Holdings Administration owed $3.5 million. On 9 February 2016, he was the subject of a bankruptcy hearing over a $2.8 million debt to GE Commercial Finance relating to the sale of his private jet aeroplane. Federal Court judge, Jacqueline Gleeson, ruled GE was entitled to make Tinkler, then resident in Singapore, bankrupt, but stayed the order pending an urgent appeal. On 2 March 2016, Tinkler failed to lodge an appeal in the required time and so was officially declared bankrupt. He told his bankruptcy trustee that he only had one asset, a farm near the NSW north coast town of Port Macquarie, which has caveats held on it by retailer Gerry Harvey and the local council.
