= Pete Gray (activist) =

Australian environmental activist

- Born: Peter Robert Gray; 10 May 1980; Newcastle, New South Wales
- Died: 30 April 2011 (aged 30)
- Education: University of Newcastle
- Occupation: Archivist
- Known for: Political and environmental activism

Peter Robert Gray (10 May 1980 – 30 April 2011) was an Australian environmental activist, notable for two landmark court cases, and for having thrown his shoes in public at former Prime Minister of Australia John Howard in protest over Australia's participation in the 2003 invasion of Iraq.

He was described in an obituary in the Sydney Morning Herald as "a pleasure-loving intellectual" driven by "an instinctive anti-authoritarianism bordering on the larrikin".

== Biography ==
Gray was born in Newcastle, New South Wales, and obtained a Bachelor of Arts degree, majoring in Classics, at the University of Newcastle; and then worked as an archivist in the university library. He was simultaneously a member of the Rising Tide "climate change action group", campaigning in particular against logging and coal mining.

In 2006, he took the Government of New South Wales to the Land and Environment Court over its environmental assessment of the Anvil Hill Coal Mine. The Court found in his favour, ruling that the government had failed to properly assess the greenhouse gas pollution that would be caused by the mining and subsequent use of the coal. It was described by Greenpeace as a "landmark case [...] that forced tougher scrutiny of coal mine emissions in Australia".

In 2009, he initiated what the Australian Broadcasting Corporation described as "the first ever legal action aimed at curbing greenhouse gas pollution from a coal-fired power station", by taking Bayswater Power Station owners Macquarie Generation to the Land and Environment Court. He asked the court to find that the power station had been "wilfully or negligently disposing of waste [...] by emitting carbon dioxide into the atmosphere in a manner that has harmed or is likely to harm the environment in contravention of section 115(1) of the Protection of the Environment Operations Act 1997", and sought an injunction against the station. The case, Gray and Anor v Macquarie Generation, was ongoing at the time of his death.

He was also "the original instigator of what is now an annual flotilla in Newcastle harbour, disrupting the movement of ships for a day at the world’s largest coal export port", and was arrested several times.

=== Q&A shoe-throwing incident ===
In October 2010, Gray was in the audience of a Q&A talk show episode in which members of the public were invited to ask questions to former Prime Minister John Howard. Gray asked:

"The recent releases of American military information from WikiLeaks show evidence of tens of thousands of civilian casualties as a result of the invasion of Iraq, as well as widespread abuse and torture of prisoners. There were no WMDs. Many people now regard the Iraq war as a strategic failure and think it probably incited more terrorist violence than it stopped. How should you be held accountable for Australia's participation in the war on Iraq?"

Dissatisfied with John Howard's reply, and prevented from asking a follow-up question due to host Tony Jones telling him "We've got to move on", Gray, apologising to Jones, threw both his shoes at the former Prime Minister, and shouted: "That's for the Iraqi dead". Neither of the shoes hit Howard. Partner Naomi Hodgson, who had accompanied him, left the studio with him, shouting that Howard had "blood on [his] hands". The action echoed that of Iraqi journalist Muntazer al-Zaidi, who had thrown his shoes at the President of the United States, George W. Bush, during a press conference two years earlier. Gray's action "hit the headlines" in Australia, and also received global media coverage. Australian Prime Minister Julia Gillard condemned the action, saying there was "no excuse for that kind of disrespectful conduct towards anyone", and Tony Jones described him as an "idiot", which Gray later commented "does actually hurt a bit coming from Tony Jones".

Gray himself later said that he had found the event "stressful" because it wasn't "in [his] own nature" to throw anything at anyone. He subsequently published an article in The Newcastle Herald, explaining his action:

"Political leaders must be held accountable for their actions – this is a neglected yet fundamental part of the democratic system of which we are justifiably proud – but Mr Howard’s election loss does not constitute anything like a full measure of accountability. [...] My actions on the set of Q&A upset a lot of people. Mr Howard’s actions killed a lot of people. I will remain unapologetic, and it appears he will do the same. I encourage everyone to express their own views on the wars in the Middle East, their views on Mr Howard, and their views on my actions, but I would ask that everyone take a few moments to really try to imagine the reality of war."

The following month, in November 2010, he married Naomi Hodgson. Diagnosed with bowel cancer in 2009, he died of the cancer five months later, aged 30 years.

== Legacy ==
The Australian Broadcasting Corporation had retained Gray's shoes after he had thrown them, and Gray asked that they be sold at auction, with the money to be donated to the International Committee for the Red Cross and its work in Iraq. Upon Gray's death, Howard endorsed the idea, and Jones announced it would be seen to. The online auction took place on 26 August 2011, "with all proceeds to be directed to the Red Cross's aid efforts in Iraq". The shoes were bought by Volley, the company that had made them, for A$3,650. They were intended to be displayed in the company's online museum of "well-worn Volleys", regardless the Volley Museum webpage was removed in early 2013 having never featured the shoes. It is unknown what happened to the shoes after this time.

== See also ==
- Casualties of the Iraq War
- Muntadhar al-Zaidi
- List of shoe throwing incidents
