= Catherine Hill Bay Cultural Precinct =

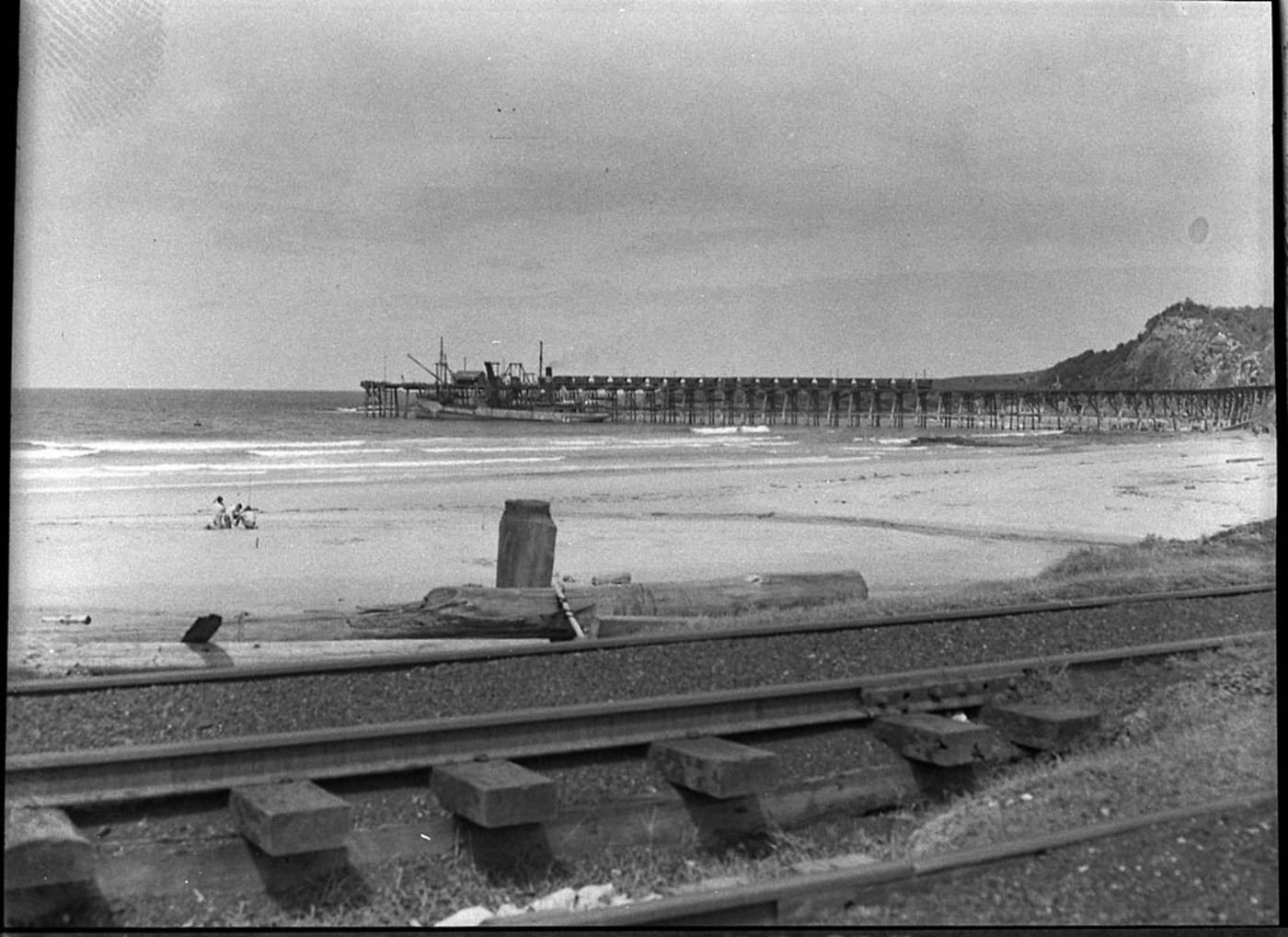
- Wharf at Catherine Hill Bay, 1957

- Location within New South Wales Location within Australia
- 33.1514°S 151.6276°E
- Location: Flowers Drive, Catherine Hill Bay, City of Lake Macquarie, New South Wales, Australia

New South Wales Heritage Register
- Official name: Catherine Hill Bay Cultural Precinct
- Type: state heritage (landscape)
- Designated: 5 November 2010
- Reference no.: 1828
- Type: Cultural Feature
- Category: Landscape – Cultural

Catherine Hill Bay Cultural Precinct is a heritage-listed company town at Catherine Hill Bay in the Hunter Region of New South Wales, Australia. It was added to the New South Wales State Heritage Register on 5 November 2010.

== History ==
Catherine Hill Bay village is the oldest collection of buildings in Lake Macquarie, retaining distinctive historical townscapes and land/seascapes, with scale, fabric and interrelationship of the features largely retained and in good condition.

Catherine Hill Bay takes its European name from the wreck of the schooner Catherine Hill, bound from the Richmond River, in 1867. In April 1865, Sydney merchants Jacob Levi Montefiore and Thomas Hale took out a mining lease on 265 acres, bordering the southern part of the bay. By the end of 1873, "splendid samples of coal" (SMH) had been mined, the original jetty, a mine manager's residence and "a number of good weatherboard shingled cottages for the workmen" were under construction in the new "Township of Cowper". In May, 1874, Thomas Hale wrote to the Postmaster General requesting a post office for the 100 people then in the township. In 1875, the company reduced miners' wages and the miners stopped work in protest, beginning a tradition of industrial disputes that was to characterise the community for a century to come. In March, 1876, the New Wallsend Coal Company, bankrupt and undercapitalised, suspended operations. By late 1880, the settlement was abandoned, many of its buildings dismantled and re-erected elsewhere.

In 1888 the Wallarah Coal Company, an English venture with strong colonial connections, purchased land including the former Cowper Township and began construction of a jetty to replace the original wharf which had burned two years before. By January 1890, the mining community was firmly re-established as "Catherine Hill Bay" and the first shipment of coal left the new jetty. A brief industrial dispute the same year was resolved in the Company's favour. By 1892, Police services, a school, and rumours, at least of "telephonic connection with Wyee", joined several churches as harbingers of a lasting settlement. In 1899, several miners challenged their eviction from company housing in Court and won. By the turn of the century, Catherine Hill Bay's reputation as a "picturesque" beauty spot had been added to its underlying identity as a scene of industrial prosperity and occasional labour unrest.

The township continued to grow and prosper through the first quarter of the 20th Century with expanding public services, a Court House, a School of Arts and a Brass Band. By 1908, miner's residences and mine-related services expanded to Middle Camp, a short distance up the bay, location of a pit-head and a large plant. In 1915, Catherine Hill Bay Public School, too, was shifted to Middle Camp, acknowledging this community as the new focus of Company development.

In August, 1917, miners at Catherine Hill Bay struck in sympathy with striking Railway workers. The Government of New South Wales replied by taking over direct control of the state's coal mines, importing strike-breaking labourers to keep them in operation. At Catherine Hill Bay, a train was deliberately derailed and the jetty dynamited. Extra police were sent to the town to protect the railway, the jetty, a nearby armaments depot and the strike-breakers. Even when relations between miners and employers were peaceful, discontent and public concern mounted over the deteriorating conditions in which Company housing obliged the miners to live. By February 1929, coal miners across NSW were once again on strike and strike-breakers were imported to work the Wallarah colliery. The worldwide economic depression followed. Jobs across the state in coal mining plummeted by some 10 000, by 1933. Increasing mechanisation of the coal industry affected Catherine Hill Bay by 1937, even as economic conditions began to improve, keeping employment precarious and fuelling the decade of industrial unrest that preceded the Second World War. In 1941, public attention focussed again on Catherine Hill Bay, when 100 Wallarah miners staged a stay-in for a record 101 hours over a penalty clause in their award. Publicity surrounding the event called attention to the squalid living conditions in the company town, noting that it was completely owned "by shareholders who live in England."

During the ensuing decade, sporadic schemes to improve housing, services and facilities in the communities of the Catherine Hill Bay Cultural Precinct stalled, failed, were indefinitely postponed or succumbed to token gestures such as the bowling green, tennis court and recreation area which graced Middle Camp in the early 50s. These modest amenities were the first substantial public works since the Public School, in 1915. They were also the last.

In 1962, Coal & Allied absorbed the J & A Brown Abermain Seaham Collieries which had taken over the Wallarah Coal Company, in 1956. In 1964 Coal & Allied decided to sell the company cottages to their occupants. While this scheme provided greater incentive for the new owners to maintain and improve their homes, dwindling employment throughout the remainder of the 20th Century saw declining population and a corresponding disappearance of community services. The Public School closed in 1985. In 1992 Coal & Allied retrenched 280 workers and, the following year sold the operation to Lake Coal which cut jobs still further in preparation for closing down the mine. The Anglican Church and the Post Office both closed in 1993.

Today, the remaining miners and descendants of miners in the Catherine Hill Bay Cultural Precinct have been joined by relatively recent arrivals, attracted by the distinctive character of the built environment and the aesthetic appeal of its setting. That environment is a rare survivor among the state's former company towns, most of which are either abandoned (Joadja, Minmi) or changed beyond recognition.

In 2000 mining began to decline due to geological issues and mining ceased in Catherine Hill Bay in 2002.

In 2008 Catherine Hill Bay Cultural Precinct was listed on the NSW State Heritage Register.

== Description ==
The Catherine Hill Bay Cultural Precinct, 26 kilometres south of Newcastle and 100 kilometres north of Sydney, located on the Wallarah Peninsula, bordered by Lake Macquarie to the west and the Pacific Ocean to the East. The precinct is set in a wider coastal landscape, now largely dedicated as a National Park, which is distinctive both for its coastal topography and which creates a natural visual catchment. The area retains its open and undeveloped character, with slowly regenerating coastal scrub. Itand is highly sensitive, visually, to any new development due to a high degree of visibility from various vantage points across the landscape. Although the varied and dramatic juxtaposition of broader sea-land landscapes, ranging from exposed ridges and cliff forms to sheltered sloping gullies, does not lie within the Cultural Precinct, this setting contributes powerfully to the sense of the built environment's modest scale.

The village's early buildings in the village are typically small, vernacular mining cottages, dating from the 1890s to the 1920s, located sporadically in, and constituting a significant part of, the open coastal landscape. Its two villages, Catherine Hill Bay and Middle Camp consist principally of modest miners' cottages lining both sides of the road through the towns. In the Cultural Precinct and its surroundings are the evident and easily accessible remnants of mining infrastructure from the 19th century to the present.

From the south, at the corner of Clarke and Montefiore Streets, the dramatic landforms of the headland and beach dominate rows of small houses stepping down the hill. From the north, along Flowers Drive through Middle Camp, the jetty and headlands are visible. Against this striking backdrop, the character of the streets derives from the low-scale built form and highly consistent pattern of predominantly single storey weatherboard cottages. This reflects the historical association with the coal company.

=== Condition ===
The Catherine Hill Bay Cultural Precinct forms the oldest collection of buildings in Lake Macquarie with scale, fabric and interrelationship of the features largely retained and in good condition. The Precinct and its surroundings are significant archaeological resources for the investigation of the area's industrial heritage.

The Catherine Hill Bay Cultural Precinct remains an exceptionally intact example of an early Australian company town.

Ongoing additions and modifications to the original building stock over time have tended to respect the prevailing scale, materials and spatial relations that characterise the Precinct.

== Heritage listing ==
The Catherine Hill Bay Cultural Precinct comprises picturesque and distinctive historic townscapes forming the oldest group of buildings in Lake Macquarie, set in land/seascapes of exceptional aesthetic and technical significance, both visually and as an archaeological resource for industrial heritage.

The boundary established by the Independent Heritage Advisory Panel for the Catherine Hill Bay Heritage Cultural Precinct encompasses the distinctive dwellings and coal mining infrastructure of the villages of Catherine Hill Bay and Middle Camp. The original buildings, most of which are small vernacular cottages dating from the 1890s to the 1920s form pleasing streetscapes evoking the settlement's origins as a nineteenth century mining village. Although few buildings belong to a recognised style or period, each is distinctive, and all display a high degree of consistency in terms of size, scale, form, setbacks, siting and materials. The urban pattern of the Catherine Hill Bay Cultural Precinct can be appreciated in its bush and coastal setting, particularly on the northern approach.

The Precinct is set in a landscape, now largely dedicated as a National Park, which is distinctive both for its coastal topography which creates a natural visual catchment and for its evidence of coal mining dating from the 1890s.

The Catherine Hill Bay Cultural Precinct is now rare, as an intact surviving example of "Company Town" development. In Lake Macquarie such developments generally evolved more informally than the company town infrastructures elsewhere in the Upper Hunter and other parts of Australia.

Catherine Hill Bay Cultural Precinct was listed on the New South Wales State Heritage Register on 5 November 2010 having satisfied the following criteria.

The place is important in demonstrating the course, or pattern, of cultural or natural history in New South Wales.

The Precinct's built environments, location and geological character are state significant because of the key role played by 19th Century company towns in the development of Australian resources. It is significant for the continuing association of the area with coal mining. This development is clearly evidenced by remnants of railways, the structures and extent in the immediate setting of untouched landscape typical of mining occupation of the foreshores. The jetty and other structures play a key role in reflecting the long term importance of CHB as a company town. The place's strong sense of history is evidenced by remnants and structures which commemorate the working activity of the town.

The place has a strong or special association with a person, or group of persons, of importance of cultural or natural history of New South Wales's history.

The Catherine Hill Bay Cultural Precinct is state significant for its associations with coal mining, organised labour, and early maritime industry in NSW. It is located on by the oldest coal mining lease in NSW, Consolidated Coal Lease 706. It is associated with the earliest examples of industrial action in NSW and with the evolution of unionised labour in the state. The Precinct's association with the Australian maritime industry is strong with regular shipping activity from the jetty stretching from its earliest days (1870s) to 2001, when shipping ceased. In 2004-5 the community subscribed $20,000 to build a memorial at the Bay for its citizens who died in war, most of whom were miners, jetty hands, seamen, or the family of those people. The Precinct is also associated with the State Heritage Register listed WWII radar station RS208, near Mine Camp, which was a key unit in Australia's war time protection and was manned in part by Catherine Hill Bay women who were members of the WAAF.

The place is important in demonstrating aesthetic characteristics and/or a high degree of creative or technical achievement in New South Wales.

The built form in Catherine Hill Bay Cultural Precinct' s two villages is aesthetically significant at a state level as a highly intact late nineteenth century company town characterised by a varied range of finishes and scale typified by simple forms of predominately one storey height. The Precinct's setting exhibits visual significance owing to the diversity of landforms, vegetation communities and waterforms. The pervasive evidence of the Precinct's industrial history is technically and archaeologically significant.

The place has strong or special association with a particular community or cultural group in New South Wales for social, cultural or spiritual reasons.

Catherine Hill Bay exhibits a significant sense of place and history through a number of monuments and memorials and through its association with the development of company towns in NSW. The community remains closely integrated despite the aging and passing of older residents who worked in the mines, and their families. Some eight movies or TV shows have used the Bay as a location in the past 25 years and these form the core of the "Catho Classics Film Festival" inaugurated in 2004 with the screening of Mel Gibson's first starring film "Summer City" and a video documentary produced by local residents which recorded the memories of residents who participated in the movie. A current project by the Progress Association to produce a social history of Catherine Hill Bay miners' cottages focusses on the domestic life and extended networks of families who lived in the cottages from the 1890s to the present.

The place has potential to yield information that will contribute to an understanding of the cultural or natural history of New South Wales.

The Precinct is an archaeological resource with potential to contribute to our understanding of the industrial heritage of Lake Macquarie and NSW. Lake Macquarie City Council's "Strategic Issues Study" on Wallarah South (1995) included a review of Aboriginal Archaeology which recommended that a field study should focus on the Middle Camp Gully. Further research and consultation are needed in order to formulate appropriate management strategies for the Aboriginal cultural heritage resource of the Precinct, its setting and the Wallarah Peninsula generally. The precinct also provides a rare living example of the scale, materials and spatial relations that typified Company Towns in NSW from the late nineteenth century onwards.

The place possesses uncommon, rare or endangered aspects of the cultural or natural history of New South Wales.

The Catherine Hill Bay Cultural Precinct is rare in NSW as coal mining company town that has retained integrity of scale, shape and size with in situ comprehensive remnants and memorials of century-long mining activity in a natural coastal location. No other mining locality contains such an intact and compact representation of 19th and 20th century coal mining, rail and sea transportation in an isolated coastal environment which remains in much the same natural state as it was in the 1880s.

The place is important in demonstrating the principal characteristics of a class of cultural or natural places/environments in New South Wales.

The Catherine Hill Bay Cultural Precinct is state significant as a documented and widely acknowledged intact representative of the era of company towns in the development of Australia's resources. The integrity and intactness of the Precinct's built environment, industrial infrastructure landscape and seascape, from the 19th Century to the present, are largely due to underground mining by coal companies which owned freehold land, thus restraining surface development for more than a century.

== See also ==
- Coastal coal-carrying trade of New South Wales
