= Donaldson coal mine =

Coal mine in New South Wales, Australia

Donaldson Coal Mine
- Location within New South Wales
- Location: New South Wales, Australia; 32°49′14″S 151°36′26″E
- Products: Coking coal
- Opened: 1999
- Closed: 2013
- Company: Yancoal
- Website: Donaldson Coal

The Donaldson Coal Mine is a coal mine located around 5 km west of Beresfield, and about 25 km from the Port of Newcastle in New South Wales. Operated by Donaldson Coal in a group of three mines, Donaldson, Abel and Tasman, the lease to operate commenced December 1999. The mine has coal reserves amounting to 827.4 million tonnes of coking coal, one of the largest coal reserves in Asia and the world. The mine had an annual production capacity of 10 million tonnes of coal. The mine was closed in 2013 and the site remediated.
