= Middlemount coal mine =

Mine in Queensland, Australia

Middlemount Coal Mine
- Location within Queensland
- Location: Queensland, Australia; 22°52′55″S 148°38′22″E
- Products: Coking coal
- Company: Peabody Energy (50%); Yancoal (50%)

The Middlemount Coal Mine is an open-cut mine located approximately 90 kilometres north-east of Emerald and some 7 kilometres west of the township of Middlemount in Queensland's Bowen Basin.

The mine produces medium-volatile pulverized coal injection (PCI) coal and semi-hard coking coal for the export market. Full scale operations at the open-cut mine commenced in November 2011. Production is expected to ramp up to approximately 3.6 Mtpa of saleable production by the middle of 2014. With JORC compliant measured and indicated resources and proved and probable ROM reserves of some 123 mt and 96 mt respectively at mine startup the current mine life is estimated to be in excess of 24 years.

Middlemount Coal is a 50/50 joint venture between Peabody Energy and Yancoal.

== History ==
Nathan Tinkler paid $11.5 million to Sennen Resources in 2006 for the undeveloped mine. In 2007, Tinkler sold a 30% share to the Hong Kong-based Noble Group for $50 million. Later that year, Tinkler sold the rest of his stake in the mine to Macarthur Coal for shares in Macarthur Coal and $57 million in cash.

In January 2013, Cyclone Oswald caused flooding in the area which resulted in the breach of levee banks. Production at the mine was halted for a number of weeks.

On 26 June 2019, 55 year old mine worker David Routledge was killed when a mining excavator he was operating was engulfed from a wall collapse.

== See also ==
- Coal mining in Australia
- List of mines in Australia
