= Cameby Downs coal mine =

Mine in Australia

Coordinates: 26°36′58″S 150°21′11″E

Cameby Downs Coal Mine
- Interactive map of Cameby Downs Coal Mine
- Location: Darling Downs, Queensland, Australia
- Products: Coking coal
- Opened: 2010
- Company: Yancoal

The Cameby Downs Coal Mine is a coal mine located 16 km south-east of Miles on the Darling Downs in Queensland. The mine has coal reserves amounting to 688 million tonnes of thermal coal, one of the largest coal reserves in Asia and the world. Coal is extracted from the Juandah Formation in the Surat Basin.

Mining operations began in 2010. The mine has an annual production capacity of 2 million tonnes of coal. It is owned by Yancoal.

Cameby Downs was one of numerous Queensland mines closed during the 2010–11 Queensland floods.

Syntech Resources, who owned the mine in 2009 and itself was owned by Goldman Sachs, announced plans for a significant expansion of production from 1.8.

Exports from the mine leave via the Port of Brisbane.

When the mine was constructed, the missing Wandoan-Moura Rail Link was expected to be completed, when Queensland Rail cancelled this, the mine was left with a much slower production rate and left to use the few remaining slots on the West Moreton Rail Corridor, Main Line railway.

== See also ==
- Coal in Australia
- List of mines in Australia
