= Antiene railway station =

Former railway station in New South Wales, Australia

Antiene

General information
- Location: Antiene Railway Station Road, Antiene, New South Wales; Australia
- Coordinates: 32°20′18″S 150°59′04″E
- Operator: Public Transport Commission
- Line: Main North
- Distance: 273.900 km from Central
- Platforms: 1 (1 side)
- Tracks: 2

Construction
- Structure type: Ground

Other information
- Status: Demolished

History
- Opened: 5 December 1890
- Closed: 29 June 1975
- Former names: Apple Tree (1890–1891); Toowong (1891–1906)

Services
Preceding station	Former services	Following station
Grasstree towards Wallangarra	Main Northern Line	Ravensworth towards Sydney
Location

Antiene railway station was a railway station on the Main North line, serving the locality of Antiene in New South Wales, Australia. It opened in 1890 as Apple Tree but was renamed Toowong on 1 January 1891. It was renamed Antiene in September 1906. The station closed to passenger services in 1975 and was subsequently demolished. No trace of the station now remains.
