= Duralie coal mine =

Stratford Duralie
- Interactive map of Stratford Duralie
- Location: New South Wales, Australia; 32°18′10″S 151°56′28″E
- Products: Coking coal
- Company: Yancoal
- Website: Stratford Duralie

Stratford Duralie is a coal mine located in the New South Wales. The mine has coal reserves amounting to 322.3 million tonnes of coking coal, one of the largest coal reserves in Asia and the world. The mine has an annual production capacity of 5 million tonnes of coal.

Stratford is preparing to finish coal extraction in 2024 and will transition to closure upon completion of mining operations. The closure of Stratford is consistent with the planned and approved life of mining for the operations. Stratford will have exhausted its approved commercial coal reserves in 2024.
