= Muscle Creek, New South Wales =

Coordinates: 32°15′54″S 150°59′4″E

Muscle Creek is a locality a part of Muswellbrook local government area in the Hunter Region of New South Wales. It is located south of Muswellbrook and gets its name from the original settlers due to he finding of many mussels along the bank. It has recently been updated by the Muswellbrook Shire Council and many changes have been made. They had included new walkways, an AR Tour of the creek and made the walk a bit more appealing to view.
