= Ravensworth railway station =

Former railway station in New South Wales, Australia

Ravensworth
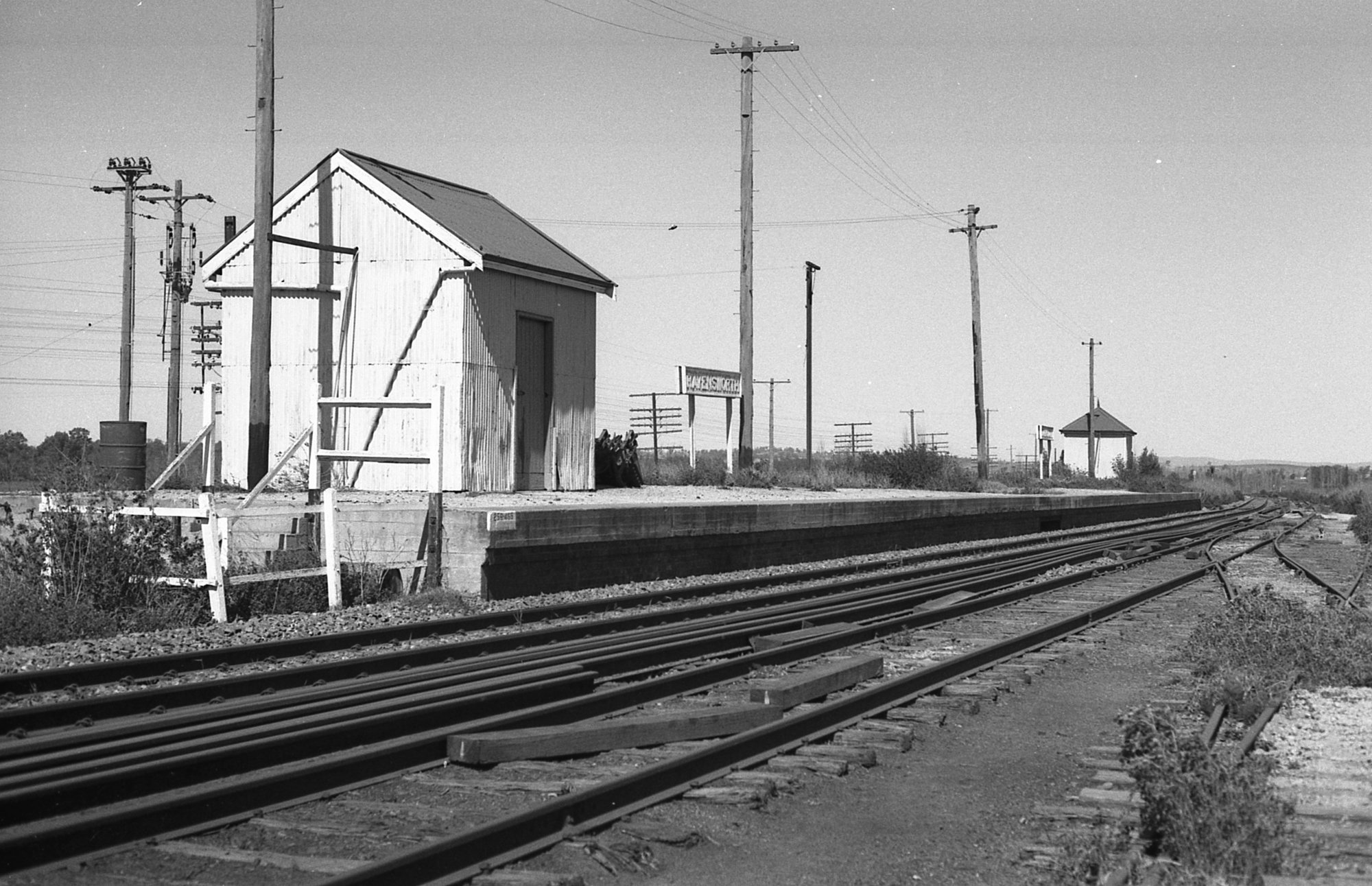

General information
- Location: Ravensworth, New South Wales
- Coordinates: 32°26′33″S 151°03′27″E
- Operator: Public Transport Commission
- Line: Main North
- Distance: 259.423 kilometres from Central
- Platforms: 2 (2 side)
- Tracks: 2

Construction
- Structure type: Ground

Other information
- Status: Demolished

History
- Opened: 1 June 1869
- Closed: 11 January 1975
- Former names: Camberwell (1869–1876)

Services
Preceding station	Former services	Following station
Antiene towards Wallangarra	Main Northern Line	Nundah towards Sydney
Location

Ravensworth railway station was a regional railway station located on the Main North line, serving the Hunter Valley town of Ravensworth.

== History ==
Ravensworth station opened in 1869 as Camberwell, and was renamed Ravensworth in 1876. The station was renamed to match that of a local homestead.

On 14 June 1939, the mutilated body of a railway fettler was found on the tracks at the railway station, wearing pyjamas. It was suspected that the man had been sleepwalking from his nearby tent, and had wandered onto the tracks before being hit by the Sydney to Glen Innes Mail service.

Ravensworth station was closed to passenger services in 1975. It was subsequently completely demolished after closure.

In November 2024, a stabbing occurred on board a Hunter line service, with the train stopping at the site of the former station to allow for police to attend to the female victim. She was transported to the local John Hunter Hospital, with the stabbing determined to be an act of domestic violence.
