= Mangoola coal mine =

Coal mine in New South Wales, Australia

Coordinates: 32°17.5′S 150°41′E

- Interactive map of Mangoola coal mine
- Location: Wybong, Australia
- Products: Thermal coal
- Opened: 2011
- Company: Glencore
- Website: www.glencore.com.au

The Mangoola coal mine, formerly known as the Anvill Hill coal mine is a coal mine in the Hunter Valley, New South Wales, Australia.

== History ==
The project was developed by Centennial Coal. The mine provides coal mostly for the production of electricity.

The proposed mine EA (environmental assessment) was provided to the Department of Planning in June 2006. On 7 June the NSW Planning Minister Frank Sartor approved the proposed mine, stating that not going ahead with the mine would make no overall difference to climate change and thus would slow down the economy of New South Wales without good reason. Additionally many local landowners where happy to accept Centennial Coal's purchase offer, and further environmental surveys showed species were found in greater abundance, further afield, than protestors had stated was the case.

That same year, however, the Land and Environment Court of New South Wales found, in a case initiated by environmentalist Pete Gray, that the government had failed to properly assess the greenhouse gas pollution that would be caused by the mining and subsequent use of the coal. This was described by Greenpeace as a "landmark case [...] that forced tougher scrutiny of coal mine emissions in Australia".

In September 2007, Centennial Coal sold the mine to Xstrata. It was included in the takeover of Xstrata to Glencore. In 2011 production commenced. In 2021 Glencore was given permission to continue mining until 2030.
