= Yancoal =

Australian coal mining company

- Type: Dual-listed
- Traded as: ASX: YAL; SEHK: 3668
- Industry: Mining
- Founded: 2004
- Headquarters: Sydney, Australia
- Products: Coal
- Revenue: $5.4 billion (2021)
- Net income: $791 million (2021)
- Number of employees: 4,500 (2021)
- Parent: Yanzhou Coal (62.5%)
- Website: www.yancoal.com.au

Yancoal is an Australian coal mining company operating mines in New South Wales, Queensland and Western Australia. A dual-listed company on the Australian Securities Exchange and the Hong Kong Stock Exchange, Yancoal is majority owned by the Yankuang Group.

== History ==
Yancoal was established in 2004 with the acquisition of the Austar coal mine in the Hunter Valley. In June 2012 it was listed on the Australian Securities Exchange. In September 2017 Coal & Allied was purchased by Yancoal from Rio Tinto. In December 2018 Yancoal became a dual-listed company when it was listed on the Hong Kong Stock Exchange.

Yancoal produced 13.9 million tonnes (31 billion pounds) of run-of-mine coal (an increase from the previous quarter’s 8.3 million tonnes or 18 billion pounds) during the June 2024 quarter with 8.6 million tonnes (19 billion pounds) in attributable coal sales.

== Assets ==
=== Current ===
==== New South Wales ====
- Ashton
- Hunter Valley Operations (49%) with Glencore
- Moolarben
- Mount Thorley Warkworth
- Stratford Duralie

==== Queensland ====
- Cameby Downs
- Middlemount (50%) with Peabody
- Yarrabee

==== Western Australia ====
- Premier Coal, purchased from Wesfarmers in September 2011

=== Former ===
- Austar
- Donaldson
