= Macarthur Coal =

Mining company in Australia, 1995 to 2012

- Industry: Mining
- Founded: October 1995
- Founder: Ken Talbot
- Defunct: 21 December 2012
- Fate: Acquired by Peabody Energy
- Headquarters: Central Queensland, Brisbane, Australia
- Area served: Worldwide
- Key people: Nicole Hollows; Chief Executive officer and Managing Director; Keith De Lacy; Chairman
- Products: Coking coal
- Net income: ▼ A$125.1 million (2010)
- Total assets: ▲ A$1,567 million (2010)
- Website: www.macarthurcoal.com.au

Macarthur Coal was a mining company based in Queensland, Australia, which was incorporated in October 1995. The company was founded by Ken Talbot, who was a former chief executive officer.

It specialised in the production of metallurgical coal from mines in the Bowen Basin, specifically low-volatile pulverised injection coal used in steel making; essentially all the coal it produced was exported from Australia.

== Assets ==
The company maintained a 73.3% ownership in all its major mine projects. As of 2010 it had open-cast mines at Coppabella, where the first coal was mined in October 1998, and 2.4 million tonnes of coal was produced from 2.9 million tonnes of material mined in 2009, and Moorvale (first coal March 2003, 2.2 million tonnes of coal from 2.9 million tonnes of material), and was opening a third mine at Middlemount with an initial target of 1.8 million tonnes of material per year. A fourth mine, Codrilla, at Valkyrie was selected for development in 2011.

== History ==
In the first half of 2010, Macarthur Coal made an offer for Gloucester Coal which was not successful; New Hope and Peabody Energy made offers for Macarthur Coal which were also rejected.

A force majeure declaration was in place for the five months preceding 28 April 2011, due to the 2010–2011 Queensland floods.

In May 2011, the company announced that it had increased coal reserves estimates by 38% to 2.26 billion tonnes.

The company was acquired by US company Peabody Energy in late 2011.

== See also ==
- Coal in Australia
