= Camberwell, New South Wales =

Camberwell
- Town
- Coordinates: 32.473650°S 151.089339°E
- Country: Australia
- State: New South Wales
- LGA: Singleton Shire

Population
  - Total: 83
- Postcode: 2330

Camberwell is a small village just off the New England Highway in the Hunter Region of New South Wales, Australia. It is 196 kilometres north of Sydney and 15 kilometres northwest of Singleton in Singleton Shire.

The village has an historic Anglican church, St Clements, which was opened in 1844. The area also has numerous open-cut mining operations. The Ashton coal mine, a coking coal mine, is located nearby.

The placename almost certainly refers to Camberwell, a district in London, England.

In the 2016 Census, there were 83 people in Camberwell.
