= Coal & Allied =

Australian coal mining company

- Type: Subsidiary
- Traded as: ASX: CNA
- Industry: Mining
- Founded: 2 May 1960
- Headquarters: Australia
- Products: Coal
- Parent: Yancoal
- Website: www.coalandallied.com.au

Coal & Allied is an Australian coal mining company. Operating mines in the Hunter Valley, it is a subsidiary of Yancoal.

== History ==
Coal & Allied was formed in 1960 when Caledonian Collieries and J & A Brown & Abermain-Seaham Collieries merged. Howard Smith owned 50%.

In December 2011, Rio Tinto Coal Australia took full ownership with Coal & Allied delisted from the Australian Securities Exchange. In September 2017, Coal & Allied was sold by Rio Tinto to Yancoal.

== Assets ==
=== Current ===
- Hunter Valley Operations mine: 67.6%
- Mount Thorley mine: 80%
- Port Waratah Coal Services: 36.5%
- Warkworth mine: 55.6%

=== Former ===
- Maules Creek coal mine, sold to Whitehaven Coal February 2010
