= Moolarben coal mine =

Coal mine in New South Wales, Australia

Moolarben Coal Mine
- Interactive map of Moolarben Coal Mine
- Location: New South Wales, Australia; 32°14′55.92″S 149°46′29.52″E
- Products: Coking coal
- Company: Yancoal

The Moolarben Coal Mine is a coal mine located in the New South Wales. The mine has coal reserves amounting to 0.5 billion tonnes of raw coking coal. The mine has an annual production capacity of 13 million tonnes of coal.
