= Ashton coal mine =

Mine in New South Wales, Australia

Ashton Coal Mine
- Interactive map of Ashton Coal Mine
- Location: Camberwell, New South Wales, Australia; 32°28′09″S 151°04′41″E
- Products: Coking coal
- Closed: 2028 (scheduled)
- Company: Yancoal
- Website: www.yancoal.com.au

The Ashton coal mine is located in New South Wales, Australia. The mine is located next to Camberwell in the Upper Hunter Valley region, 15 km northwest of Singleton and 32 km southeast of Muswellbrook. The mine has coal reserves amounting to 322.5 million tonnes of coking coal. The mine applies longwall mining and currently has an annual production capacity of three million tonnes. It is scheduled to close in 2028.

== Site services ==
The site services of the mine are mainly located at the south of the New England Highway, which include the western ventilation fans, back road fans, main gas drainage plant, nitrogen plant and three borehole pumps.
