= Liddell Power Station =

Coal-fired power station in Australia

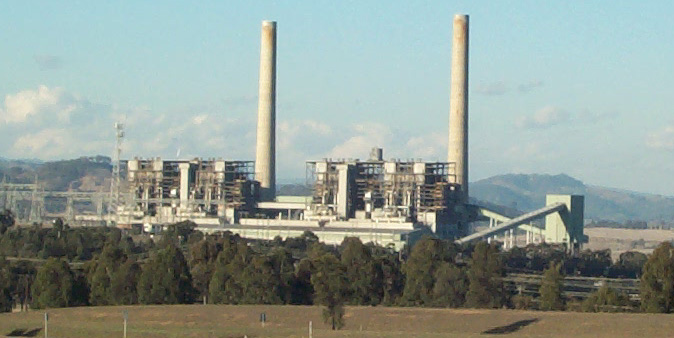
- Liddell Power Station in 2006
- Country: Australia
- Location: near Muswellbrook, New South Wales
- Coordinates: 32°22′19″S 150°58′38″E
- Status: Decommissioned
- Commission date: 1971–1973
- Decommission date: 28 April 2023
- Owner: AGL Energy

Thermal power station
- Primary fuel: Coal
- Secondary fuel: Oil
- Turbine technology: Steam turbine; Gas turbine
- Cooling source: Lake Liddell

Power generation
- Make and model: English Electric Company
- Units decommissioned: 4 × 500 megawatts (670,000 hp); 2 × 25 megawatts (34,000 hp); 1 × 0.85 megawatts (1,140 hp) mini-hydro
- Nameplate capacity: 2051 MW
- Capacity factor: 51.02% (average 2017–2021)
- Annual net output: 8,938 GW·h (average 2017–2021)

External links
- Commons: Related media on Commons

Liddell Power Station is a decommissioned coal-fired thermal power station that had four 500 megawatts (670,000 hp) EE steam-driven turbine alternators, providing a combined electrical capacity of 2,000 megawatts (2,700,000 hp).

Its operating capacity was assessed at 1,680 megawatts (2,250,000 hp) in April 2018. Commissioned between 1971 and 1973, the station is located adjacent to Lake Liddell, near Muswellbrook in the Hunter Valley of Australia.

Unit 3 was taken out of service on 1 April 2022. Subsequently, Unit 4 was decommissioned on 24 April 2023, followed by Unit 2 on 26 April 2023. The last unit, Unit 1, was removed from service on 28 April 2023.

== History ==
In September 1964, the Government of New South Wales announced its intention to construct the Liddell Power Station and create a lake for cooling, Lake Liddell. The first of four generators was completed in 1971, two more in 1972, and the fourth in 1973. At the time of completion, Liddell was the most powerful generating station in Australia. It was also the first major power station in New South Wales to be built inland, using fresh water for cooling instead of the more abundant saltwater used in coastal power stations. To accommodate this change, Lake Liddell was created to provide cooling, requiring an 11-kilometre section of the Main Northern railway line to be rebuilt on a new alignment. The completion of Liddell aided in the retirement of power stations in Sydney, such as Balmain and Bunnerong.

Originally, the plant was fitted with the then-standard electrostatic precipitators for dust collection, and the more efficient fabric filters (similar to those used at Eraring, Munmorah units 3 and 4, Vales Point 5+6, Bayswater, and Mount Piper) were retrofitted in the early 1990s, reducing particulate emissions to a barely visible level. Much of the coal was supplied by overland conveyors from mines it shared with the nearby Bayswater Power Station.

In 2007, a project commenced at Liddell to replace some of the station's boiler feed-water with hot water from a solar thermal array. By March 2007, the project had reached a second-stage prototype but had not been connected to the power station. Subsequently, a 9 MW solar section was added to the Liddell coal-fired generator, but it has now effectively been closed. Analysts say that the incentive to use the solar boost was reduced by the removal of the carbon price and excess coal supply.

Liddell Power Station was owned by the Electricity Commission of New South Wales, with ownership transferred to Macquarie Generation in 1996. In September 2014, Liddell was included in the sale of Macquarie Generation by the New South Wales government to AGL Energy.

== Alternative fuel sources ==
In addition to the coal-fired steam turbines, Liddell Power Station also operates two GEC 25 MW oil-fired gas turbines and a 0.85 MW mini-hydroelectric generator. The power station is also "licensed to co-fire plant biomass and coal to produce electricity," allowing it to utilize sawdust and wood shavings from the nearby timber industry as a portion of its fuel, replacing up to 5% of its coal requirements. However, in practice, biomass accounts for only about 0.5% of Liddell's total output.

== Greenhouse emissions ==
According to estimates from Carbon Monitoring for Action, Liddell Power Station emits approximately 14.70 million tonnes of greenhouse gases annually due to burning coal. In 2010, the Australian Government introduced a Carbon Pollution Reduction Scheme to combat climate change. This scheme has had an impact on emissions from power stations. The National Pollutant Inventory provides details of various pollutant emissions, including carbon monoxide, which was estimated to be 1,000,000 kilograms (2,200,000 lb) for the year ending 30 June 2011. A Freedom of Information request in 2018 revealed that Liddell is permitted to emit three times more nitrogen oxide than the amount allowed under best practice guidelines.

== Operations ==
The generation table uses eljmkt nemlog to obtain generation values for each year. Records date back to 2011.

Liddell Power Station generation (MWh)
Year	Total	LD01	LD02	LD03	LD04
2011	8,298,580	2,505,649	2,005,141	938,923	2,848,867
2012	7,865,039	2,462,253	2,132,226	1,264,696	2,005,864
2013	6,919,912	2,202,551	1,307,724	2,957,380	452,257
2014	7,585,713	1,794,219	1,615,699	1,923,304	2,252,491
2015	8,561,448	814,969	2,468,106	2,306,802	2,971,571
2016	9,037,331	2,409,097	2,087,540	2,361,397	2,179,297
2017	8,212,654	1,884,395	1,333,847	2,619,564	2,374,848
2018	9,147,807	2,634,806	2,413,888	1,214,612	2,884,501
2019	10,789,224	2,825,008	2,710,277	3,057,329	2,196,610
2020	8,350,728	2,044,901	1,410,233	2,230,925	2,664,669
2021	8,189,336	2,139,589	2,245,543	1,570,906	2,233,298

== Closure and site rehabilitation ==
AGL announced in 2015 and confirmed in 2017 that it intended to close the Liddell Power Station in 2022. The closure of this and other coal-burning power stations in Australia led the Prime Minister Malcolm Turnbull to seek advice from the Australian Energy Market Operator on extending the life of a number of them, to head off anticipated future electricity shortages. Turnbull said the government had been advised that if the Liddell plant were to close in 2022, there would be a 1000 MW gap in base load, dispatchable power generation. The Turnbull government asked AGL to keep Liddell open beyond 2022, or to sell the Liddell Power Plant to Alinta Energy. In August 2019, AGL announced that three of the turbines would be able to be kept running until April 2023, to ensure reliable power supply to New South Wales during the 2022–23 summer. In December 2018, a proposed upgrade to the Bayswater Power Station was approved to be completed around the same time as the proposed closure of Liddell. Both are owned by AGL Energy and consume coal from the same mine. The upgrade approval did not impose tighter air emission controls, however AGL claimed that the closure of Liddell would result in a net improvement in air quality.

The demolition process was expected to commence in early 2024 and take approximately two years. Work will include removal of all main structures (boilers, chimneys, turbine houses, coal plant) and ancillary buildings, and levelling of the site using recovered crushed concrete. More than 90 per cent of the materials in the power station are expected to be recycled during demolition, including 70,000 tonnes of steel, more than the total weight of steel works for the Sydney Harbour Bridge. Critical infrastructure, such as transmission connections, will be retained to support the ongoing use of the site as an industrial energy hub, helping provide employment and essential economic activity for the region. Planning approval has already been granted for a 500 MW/2 GWh grid-scale battery.

Unit 3 was removed from service on 1 April 2022. Unit 4 was removed from service on 24 April 2023. Unit 2 was removed from service on 26 April 2023. The last unit, Unit 1, was removed from service on 28 April 2023. Since April 2022, Liddell has typically been generating 750 MW on average.

There is a 200-hectare dam containing 39 million tonnes of coal ash at the Liddell site, and heavy metals have leached into Lake Liddell. AGL has earmarked $1.5 billion for cleanup of the Liddell, Bayswater, Torrens Island and Loy Yang A sites.

Construction of a 500 MW / 1,000 MWh grid battery at the site started in 2025.

As part of decommissioning the power station, the two 169 meter chimneys at Liddell were demolished with 260 kg of explosives each, in May 2026.

== See also ==
- Energy in Australia
