= Macquarie Generation =

Australian Energy Company

- Company type: subsidiary
- Industry: Energy
- Founded: 1996
- Headquarters: Newcastle, Australia
- Area served: National Electricity Market, Australia
- Key people: Anthony Fowler (Group General Manager ) Scott Thomas (General Manager)
- Products: Electricity generation
- Services: Public utility
- Revenue: ▼ A$1,019m (2011)
- Operating income: ▼ A$1,004m
- Net income: ▼ A$126m
- Total assets: ▼ A$4,034m
- Total equity: ▼ A$1,864m
- Owner: AGL Energy
- Number of employees: 628
- Website: www.macgen.com.au

Macquarie Generation is an electricity generation company in New South Wales, Australia, owned by AGL Energy, and has a portfolio of generating sites using predominantly thermal coal power. The company now trades as AGL Macquarie and generates electricity for sale under contract.

AGL Macquarie supplies approximately 12% of the National Electricity Market and 30% of the New South Wales electricity market. In early stages, Macquarie has commenced development of solar thermal power as a renewable source of energy.

== History ==
Macquarie Generation was established by the Government of New South Wales in 1996 under the State Owned Corporations Act, 1989 (NSW) and the Energy Services Corporation Act, 1995 (NSW) as part of the split up of the Electricity Commission of New South Wales.

In September 2014, the NSW Government sold Macquarie Generation to AGL Energy for $1.5 billion. Macquarie Generation's assets included the 2,640 MW Bayswater Power Station, the 2,000 MW Liddell Power Station, the 50 MW Hunter Valley Gas Turbines and the Liddell Solar Thermal Project.

The Liddell Power Station closed in April 2023.

== Generation portfolio ==
Macquarie Generation owns and operates the following power stations:

Name	Fuel	Type	Location	Maximum Capacity (MW)	Commissioned
Bayswater	Black coal with a 5% biomass maximum blend	Steam turbines	Muswellbrook, Hunter Valley	2,640	1985
Liddell	Black coal with a 5% biomass and a 5% recycled oil maximum blend	Steam turbines	Muswellbrook, Hunter Valley	2,000	1971
Liddell	Solar panels	Solar thermal energy	Muswellbrook, Hunter Valley		
Liddell	Oil-fired	Gas turbines	Muswellbrook, Hunter Valley	50	
Liddell	Mini-Hydro	Turbo	Muswellbrook, Hunter Valley	0.85	
