= Bayswater Power Station =

Coal-fired power station in New South Wales, Australia

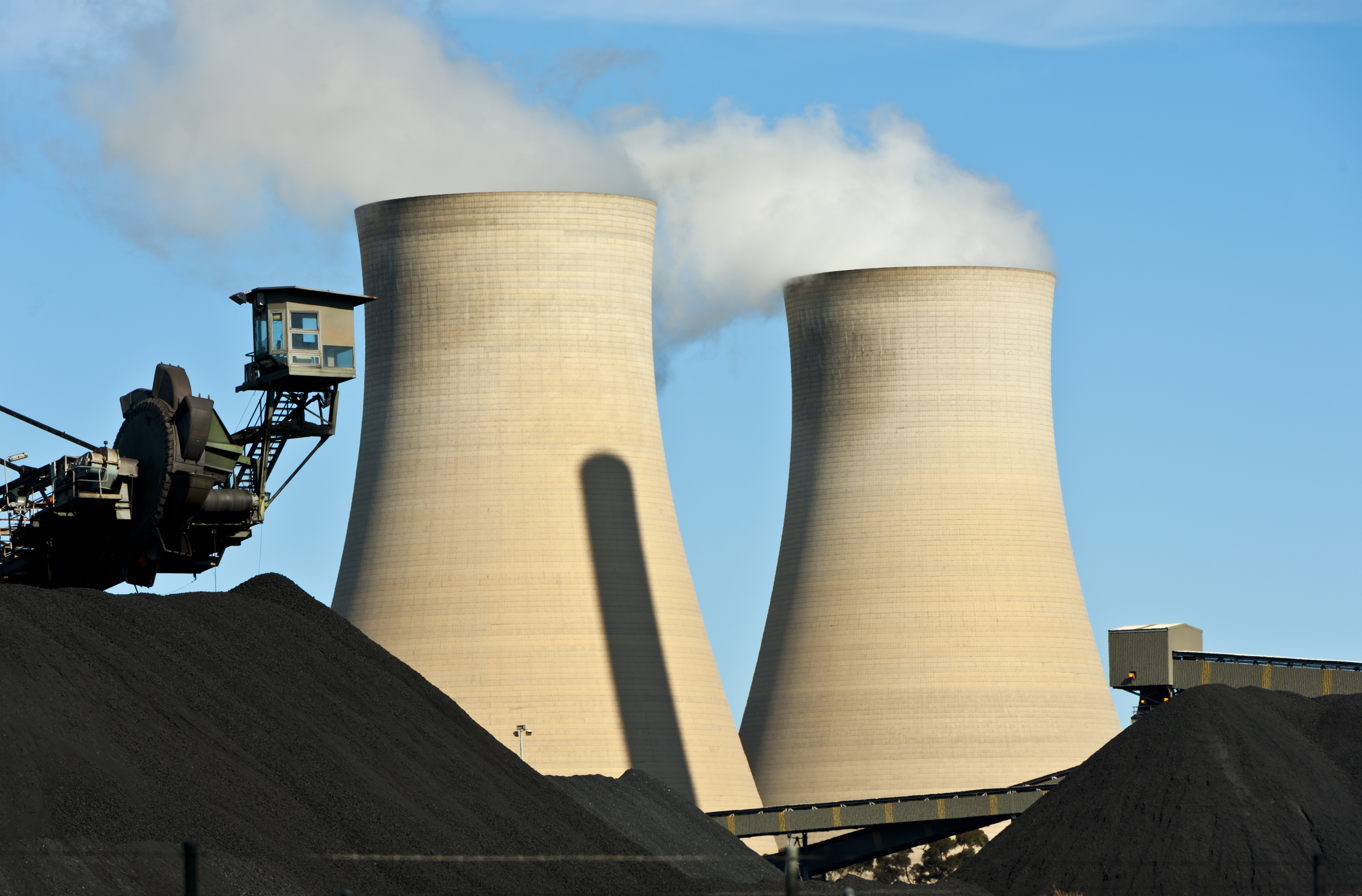
- Bayswater Power Station with coal
- Country: Australia
- Location: Hunter Valley, New South Wales
- Coordinates: 32°23′45″S 150°56′57″E
- Status: Operational
- Commission date: 1985–1986
- Owner: AGL Energy
- Employees: 1000 (500 employees and 500 contractors)

Thermal power station
- Primary fuel: Coal
- Turbine technology: Steam turbine - Subcritical
- Cooling source: Hunter River

Power generation
- Units operational: 1 × 660 MW (890,000 hp); 3 × 685 MW (919,000 hp)
- Make and model: Tokyo Shibaura Electric (Japan)
- Nameplate capacity: 2,715 MW
- Capacity factor: 66.52% (average 2017–2021)
- Annual net output: 15,383 GW·h (average 2017–2021)

External links
- Website: www.agl.com.au
- Commons: Related media on Commons

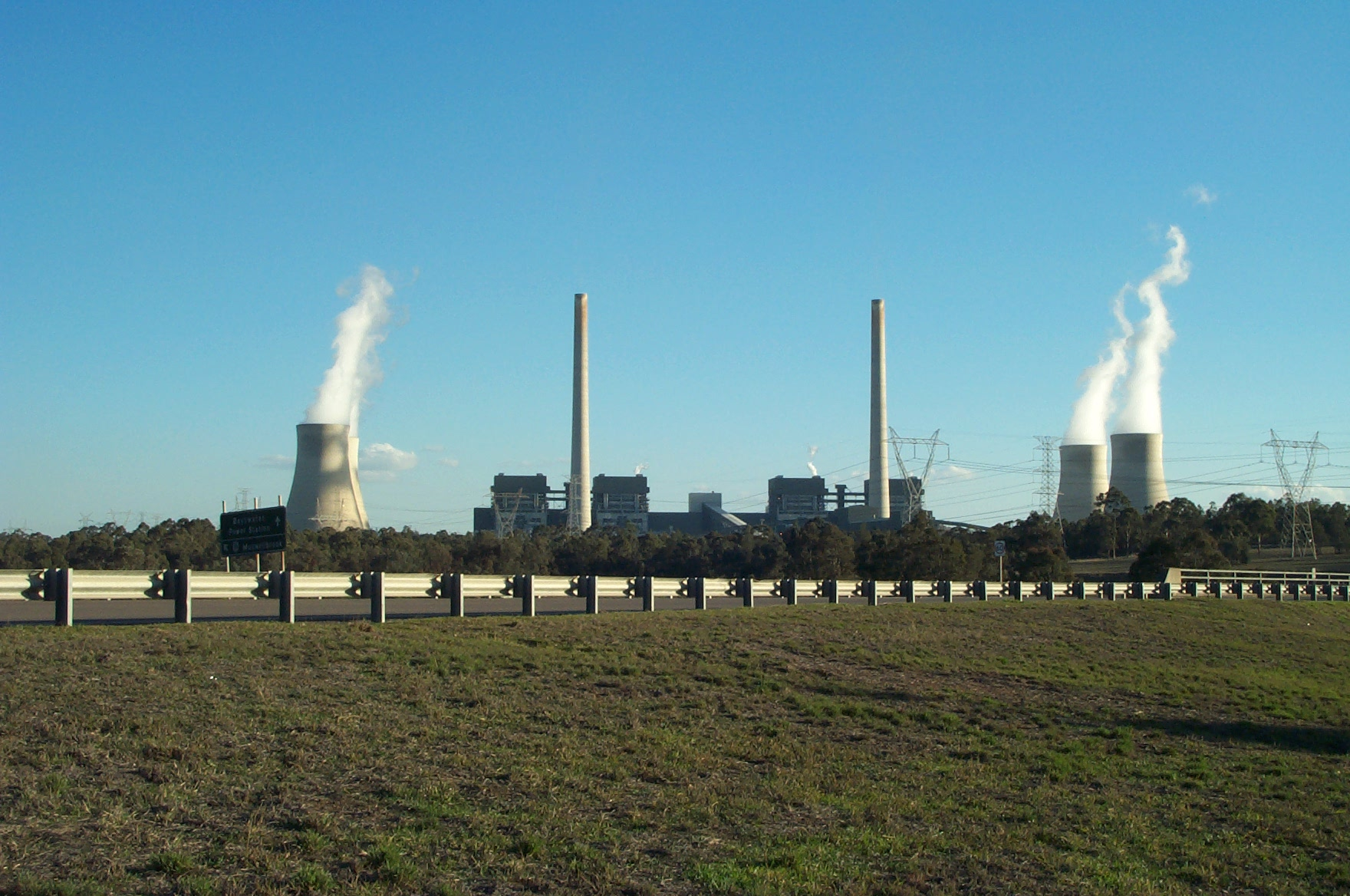
Bayswater Power Station

Bayswater Power Station is a bituminous (black) coal-powered thermal power station with one 660 MW (890,000 hp) and three upgraded 685 MW (919,000 hp) Tokyo Shibaura Electric (Japan) steam driven turbo alternators for a combined capacity of 2,715 MW (3,641,000 hp). Commissioned between 1985 and 1986, the station is located 16 km (10 mi) from Muswellbrook, and 28 km (17 mi) from Singleton in the Hunter Valley of New South Wales, Australia.

Bayswater Power Station was owned by Government of New South Wales power producer Macquarie Generation. It was included in the sale of Macquarie Generation to AGL Energy in September 2014.

== History ==
The first generator was completed in 1985, and the remaining three generators progressively that same year and throughout 1986.

Bayswater draws its cooling water from the Hunter River under water entitlements negotiated with the Government of New South Wales. The Barnard River Scheme also allows Bayswater and Liddell to transfer water from the upper Manning River catchment into the Hunter River for their use, however in recent years this system has not been utilised. All coal is supplied via the Antiene Train Unloader situated on the west side of Lake Liddell and transported to Bayswater's stockpiles by a 5.5 km (3.4 mi) long overland conveyor.

Coal consumption is around 8 Mt (8,800,000 short tons) per annum and produces around 17,000 GWh (61,000 TJ) of electricity a year. This is enough power for 2 million average Australian homes and families.

== Greenhouse emissions ==
Carbon Monitoring for Action estimates this power station emits 19.80 million tonnes of greenhouse gases each year as a result of burning coal. In 2010 the Australian Government announced the introduction of a Carbon Pollution Reduction Scheme to help combat climate change. It is expected to impact on emissions from power stations. The National Pollutant Inventory provides details of a range of pollutant emissions, including CO, estimated at 1,800 t (2,000 tons) for the year ending 30 June 2024.

In 2009, the power station was the subject of "the first ever legal action aimed at curbing greenhouse gas pollution from a coal-fired power station". Environmental activist Pete Gray went to the Land and Environment Court of New South Wales, asking it to find that the power station had been "wilfully or negligently disposing of waste [...] by emitting carbon dioxide into the atmosphere in a manner that has harmed or is likely to harm the environment in contravention of section 115(1) of the Protection of the Environment Operations Act 1997", and sought an injunction against the station. The case, Gray and Anor v Macquarie Generation, was ongoing at the time of Gray's death from cancer in April 2011.

== Mid-life upgrade ==
In December 2018, a proposed upgrade to the Bayswater Power Station was approved to be completed around the same time as the proposed closure of the Liddell Power Station in 2022. Liddell Power Station closed in April 2023. Both are owned by AGL Energy and consume coal from the same mine. The upgrade approval did not impose tighter air emission controls, however AGL claimed that the closure of Liddell would result in a net improvement in air quality. The upgrade increased the rated capacity of three turbines on the four generating units, increasing the capacity of each unit by 25 MW (34,000 hp) whilst slightly decreasing the amount of coal consumed. As the OEM for AGL's Bayswater Power Station in the New South Wales Hunter Valley, Toshiba supplied and installed upgraded turbine steam path equipment and completed generator rewinds at Bayswater to increase output by 25 MW per unit. The upgrade was completed on three out of the four units with Unit 1 remaining at its original 660 MW (890,000 hp) capacity.

By 2025, the station adjusted its output down to 20% (or zero in the weekend) by morning and up again by evening daily, due to low mid-day power prices.

== Planned closure ==
AGL Energy has announced that Bayswater Power Station will close in 2033.

== Plant information ==
=== Boilers ===
- Steam pressure: 16.55 MPa (2,400 psi)
- Steam temperature: 540 °C (1,004 °F)
- Height: 80 m (260 ft)

=== Turbine & Turbo alternators ===
- Number in use: 4
- Manufacturer: Tokyo Shibaura Electric Company, (Toshiba) Limited, Japan.
- Operating speed 3,000 rpm
- Alternator voltage: 23 kV
- Rating:
  - 1x 660 MW (890,000 hp)
  - 3x 685 MW (919,000 hp)
- Length: 50 m (160 ft)
- Weight: 1,342 t (1,479 short tons)
- Stages on each turbine:
  - 1x High Pressure Turbine
  - 1x Intermediate Pressure Turbine
  - 2x Low Pressure Turbines

=== Turbine house ===
- Length: 510 m (1,670 ft)
- Height: 38 m (125 ft)
- Width: 40 m (130 ft)

=== Emission stacks ===
- Height: 248 m (814 ft)
- Diameter at base: 23 m (75 ft)
- Diameter at top: 12 m (39 ft)

=== Cooling towers ===
- Height: 132 m (433 ft)
- Diameter at base: 100 m (330 ft)
- Diameter at top: 52 m (171 ft)

== Operations ==
Bayswater Power Station Generation (GWh)
Year	Total	BW01	BW02	BW03	BW04
2011	17,668	4,437	4,343	4,570	4,317
2012	15,510	4,384	3,562	3,805	3,757
2013	16,849	4,199	4,457	3,905	4,286
2014	16,152	4,255	4,148	4,077	3,671
2015	18,629	4,540	4,328	4,752	5,008
2016	16,687	4,446	3,484	4,272	4,483
2017	16,180	3,738	4,485	3,766	4,190
2018	14,830	2,472	3,717	4,529	4,111
2019	15,985	4,255	4,048	4,678	3,002
2020	15,463	4,359	4,282	3,718	3,103
2021	14,453	3,970	2,623	3,930	3,929
2022	14,430	4,032	4,504	2,463	3,429
