= Myuna Bay =

- Suburb
- Coordinates: 33°03′43″S 151°32′46″E
- Country: Australia
- State: New South Wales
- LGA: City of Lake Macquarie
- Location: 8 km (5.0 mi) NE of Morisset

Government
  - State electorate: Lake Macquarie
  - Federal division: Hunter

Population
  - Total: 0 (2021 census)
- Postcode: 2264
- Parish: Awaba
Suburbs around Myuna Bay
Awaba	Awaba	Arcadia Vale
Awaba	Myuna Bay	Wangi Wangi
Eraring	Eraring	Lake Macquarie

Myuna Bay is a suburb of the City of Lake Macquarie in New South Wales, Australia, and is located west of Lake Macquarie near Wangi Wangi.

Myuna Bay is largely undeveloped. It has a rest area on Wangi Road, dating back to when Wangi Road was the main road along the western shoreline of Lake Macquarie before the completion of the Sydney-Newcastle Freeway.

Myuna Bay was home to the government of New South Wales Myuna Bay Sport and Recreation Centre until its closure in 2019.
