= South Hetton =

Village in County Durham, England

Coordinates: 54.80°N 1.41°W

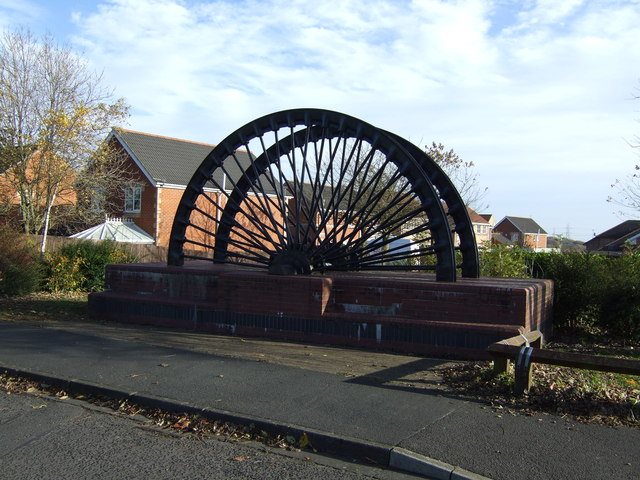
- Mining monument

- Location within County Durham
- Population: 3,032 (2011)
- OS grid reference: NZ375455
- Civil parish: South Hetton
- Unitary authority: County Durham
- Ceremonial county: Durham
- Region: North East
- Country: England
- Sovereign state: United Kingdom
- Post town: DURHAM
- Postcode district: DH6
- Dialling code: 0191
- Police: Durham
- Fire: County Durham and Darlington
- Ambulance: North East
- UK Parliament: Easington

South Hetton is a former mining village in the County Durham district of the ceremonial county of County Durham, England. It is situated 6 miles (9.7 km) to the east of Durham and 7 miles (11 km) to the south of Sunderland. It had a population of 2,618 according to the 2001 Census, rising to 3,032 at the 2011 Census, with the latest estimate being 3,036 in 2019

== History ==
=== South Hetton Colliery ===
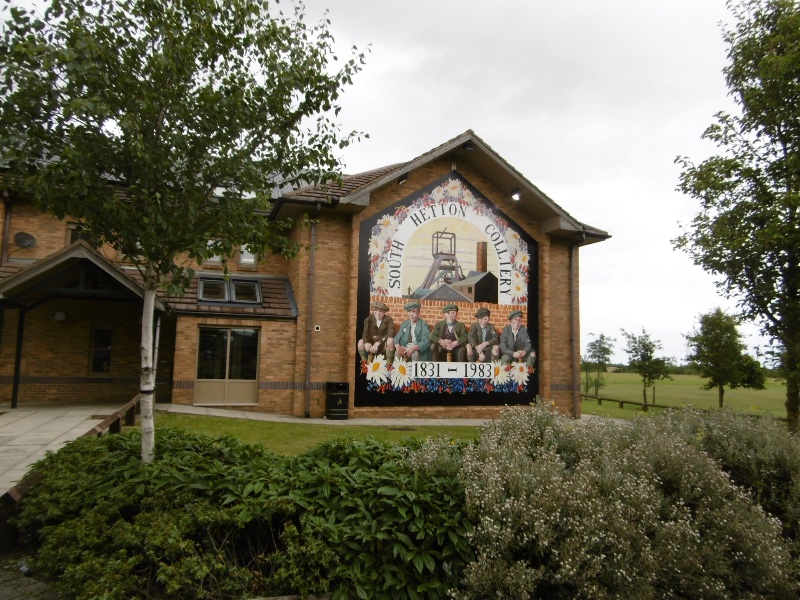
Mural at South Hetton Colliery

The history of South Hetton is closely related to South Hetton Colliery. The South Hetton Coal Company, owned by Colonel Thomas Bradyll, first sank shafts in 1831. Large scale production began two years later and corresponded with a large increase in population. Employment peaked in the 1930s when over 1400 people worked at the colliery. However, activity declined in the latter half of the twentieth century with the colliery ceasing operations in 1982. (This colliery is not to be confused with its namesake, the other South Hetton Colliery, at Coal Point on Lake Macquarie, NSW, Australia.)

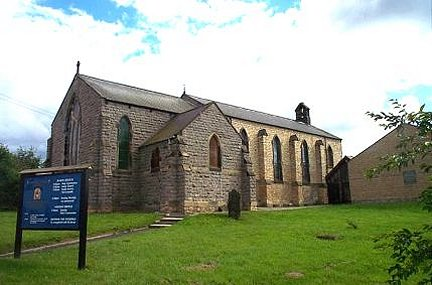
Holy Trinity Church (built 1838)

=== Angus Sibbet Murder ===
The village came to the attention of the nation in January 1967 when the body of fruit machine magnate employee Angus Sibbet was found murdered in his Jaguar car under Pesspool Bridge. Dennis Stafford and Michael Luvaglio were later convicted of the crime. There have been ongoing campaigns to clear both names, but all appeals (including to the House of Lords) have failed due to a proven but unexplained collision between the cars of Sibbet and Stafford & Luvaglio, although Stafford and Luvaglio at their trial denied seeing or meeting up with Sibbet during the vital hours surrounding the murder. The killing inspired the 1970s gangster film Get Carter starring Michael Caine.

== Notable people ==
Steph Houghton, footballer (Sunderland, Leeds United, Arsenal, Manchester City and England)

== Sports ==
South Hetton Cricket Club currently play in the Durham Senior League and have a strong link within the community with the goal of developing sport in the area.
