= Rathmines, New South Wales =

Rathmines
- Suburb
- Coordinates: 33°02′35″S 151°35′46″E
- Country: Australia
- State: New South Wales
- City: Lake Macquarie
- LGA: City of Lake Macquarie
- Location: 15 km (9.3 mi) NE of Morisset; 6 km (3.7 mi) S of Toronto; 34 km (21 mi) SW of Newcastle; 131 km (81 mi) N of Sydney; 52 km (32 mi) N of The Entrance
- Established: 1840

Government
  - State electorate: Lake Macquarie
  - Federal division: Hunter
- Elevation: 7 m (23 ft)

Population
  - Total: 2,076 (2021 census)
- Postcode: 2283
- Parish: Awaba
Suburbs around Rathmines
| Toronto | Kilaben Bay | Kilaben Bay |
| Awaba | Rathmines | Coal Point |
| Buttaba | Balmoral | Fishing Point |

Rathmines is a suburb of the City of Lake Macquarie in New South Wales, Australia on the western shore of Lake Macquarie between the towns of Toronto and Morisset.

== History ==
The Aboriginal people, in this area, the Awabakal, were the first people of this land.

Rathmines was first settled by Europeans at around 1840. It was named after the town of Rathmines in Ireland. Orchards, vineyards and cattle were the early industries. The first school opened in 1941. A RAAF base operated in Rathmines from 1939 to 1963. The artist Sir William Dobell was at one time responsible for the camouflage of the base.

Rathmines is home to many sporting teams, most notably Westlakes Wildcats FC who play out of Rathmines Oval.

Rathmines is home to Lake Macquarie's first disc golf course, located in park lands at Styles Point.

=== Heritage listings ===
Rathmines has a number of heritage-listed sites, including:

- Dorrington Road: RAAF Base Rathmines
