= Arcadia Vale =

Suburb in New South Wales, Australia, on Lake Macquarie

- Suburb
- Coordinates: 33°03′43″S 151°35′13″E
- Country: Australia
- State: New South Wales
- LGA: City of Lake Macquarie
- Location: 14 km (8.7 mi) ENE of Morisset; 34 km (21 mi) SW of Newcastle; 133 km (83 mi) N of Sydney; 25 km (16 mi) SW of Charlestown; 50 km (31 mi) N of The Entrance
- Established: 1878

Government
  - State electorate: Lake Macquarie
  - Federal division: Hunter
- Elevation: 20 m (66 ft)

Population
  - Total: 1,431 (2021 census)
- Postcode: 2283
- Parish: Awaba
Suburbs around Arcadia Vale
Awaba	Buttaba	Buttaba
Awaba	Arcadia Vale	Lake Macquarie
Myuna Bay	Wangi Wangi	Wangi Wangi

Arcadia Vale is a suburb of the City of Lake Macquarie in New South Wales, Australia between the town centres of Toronto and Morisset on the western shore of Lake Macquarie. It had a population of 1,431 in 2021, down from 1,518 in 2006.

== History ==
The Awabakal people are the first people of the area.

Arcadia Vale was subdivided in 1922. During the Great Depression, many out-of-work miners and their families moved into boatsheds on the waterfront. The first school opened in 1958.
