= Marmong Point =

- Suburb
- Coordinates: 32°58′55″S 151°37′05″E
- Country: Australia
- State: New South Wales
- LGA: City of Lake Macquarie
- Location: 23 km (14 mi) WSW of Newcastle; 5 km (3.1 mi) NNE of Toronto
- Established: 1836

Government
  - State electorate: Lake Macquarie
  - Federal division: Hunter

Area
  - Total: 0.7 km^{2} (0.27 sq mi)

Population
  - Total: 765 (2021 census)
  - Density: 1,090/km^{2} (2,830/sq mi)
- Postcode: 2284
- Parish: Awaba
Suburbs around Marmong Point
Booragul	Booragul
Woodrising	Marmong Point	Lake Macquarie
Woodrising	Woodrising

Marmong Point is a suburb of the City of Lake Macquarie in New South Wales, Australia north-north-east of the town of Toronto on the western shore of Lake Macquarie. Marmong is an Aboriginal word meaning low water or swampy water.

== History ==
The Aboriginal people, in this area, the Awabakal, were the first people of this land.

Early industry included a market garden, a sawmill, and an abattoirs.
