= Balmoral, New South Wales (Lake Macquarie) =

Balmoral
- Suburb
- Coordinates: 33°03′14″S 151°34′55″E
- Country: Australia
- State: New South Wales
- City: Lake Macquarie
- LGA: City of Lake Macquarie
- Location: 14 km (8.7 mi) NE of Morisset; 7 km (4.3 mi) S of Toronto; 33 km (21 mi) SW of Newcastle; 135 km (84 mi) N of Sydney; 51 km (32 mi) N of The Entrance

Government
  - State electorate: Lake Macquarie
  - Federal division: Hunter
- Elevation: 12 m (39 ft)

Population
  - Total: 730 (2021 census)
- Postcode: 2283
- Parish: Awaba
Suburbs around Balmoral
Rathmines	Rathmines	Rathmines
Buttaba	Balmoral	Rathmines
Buttaba	Buttaba	Fishing Point

Balmoral is a suburb of the City of Lake Macquarie in New South Wales, Australia, and is located on the western shore of Lake Macquarie between the towns of Toronto and Morisset.

It has a boat ramp providing access to Secret Bay and Eraring Bay on Lake Macquarie.

People who live in this town have Balmoral (Rathmines) on their license and any post they get due to Balmoral being a town already in NSW in Lower North Shore of Sydney.

== See also ==
- 2013 New South Wales bushfires
