= Fishing Point =

- Suburb
- Coordinates: 33°03′25″S 151°35′46″E
- Country: Australia
- State: New South Wales
- LGA: City of Lake Macquarie
- Location: 16 km (9.9 mi) NE of Morisset; 9 km (5.6 mi) S of Toronto

Government
  - State electorate: Lake Macquarie
  - Federal division: Hunter

Population
  - Total: 1,105 (2021 census)
- Postcode: 2283
- Parish: Awaba
Suburbs around Fishing Point
Balmoral	Rathmines
Buttaba	Fishing Point	Lake Macquarie
	Lake Macquarie

Fishing Point is a suburb of the City of Lake Macquarie in New South Wales, Australia, and is located on the western shore of Lake Macquarie on a peninsula south of Rathmines.
