= Buttaba =

- Suburb
- Coordinates: 33°03′04″S 151°35′06″E
- Country: Australia
- State: New South Wales
- LGA: City of Lake Macquarie
- Location: 14 km (8.7 mi) NE of Morisset; 8 km (5.0 mi) S of Toronto; 34 km (21 mi) SW of Newcastle; 134 km (83 mi) N of Sydney; 49 km (30 mi) N of The Entrance

Government
  - State electorate: Lake Macquarie
  - Federal division: Hunter
- Elevation: 17 m (56 ft)

Population
  - Total: 1,204 (2021 census)
- Postcode: 2283
- Parish: Awaba
Suburbs around Buttaba
Awaba	Rathmines	Balmoral
Awaba	Buttaba	Fishing Point
Arcadia Vale	Arcadia Vale	Lake Macquarie

Buttaba is a suburb of the City of Lake Macquarie in New South Wales, Australia on the western shore of Lake Macquarie between the towns of Toronto and Morisset, near Rathmines.
