= Fennell Bay =

- Suburb
- Coordinates: 32°59′38″S 151°35′53″E
- Country: Australia
- State: New South Wales
- City: Greater Newcastle
- LGA: City of Lake Macquarie
- Location: 3 km (1.9 mi) N of Toronto
- Established: 1882

Government
  - State electorate: Lake Macquarie
  - Federal division: Hunter

Area
  - Total: 3.8 km^{2} (1.5 sq mi)

Population
  - Total: 1,780 (2021 census)
  - Density: 468/km^{2} (1,213/sq mi)
- Postcode: 2283
- Parish: Awaba
Suburbs around Fennell Bay
Teralba	Teralba	Booragul
Fassifern	Fennell Bay	Woodrising
Blackalls Park	Lake Macquarie	Bolton Point

Fennell Bay is a lakeside suburb of the City of Lake Macquarie, Greater Newcastle in New South Wales, Australia north of the town of Toronto on a bay of the same name, on the north western shore of Lake Macquarie.

== Geological history and anthropology ==
The Aboriginal people, in this area, the Awabakal, were the first people of this land. Fennell Bay is the first place of Reservation to preserve fossil forests in Australia, and via the missionary-recorded early stories of native inhabitants, this fossil forest also holds significance to geological and Aboriginal history alike. The forest is of Permian age, composed of the same trees as formed the nearby coal seams (coal being subsequently mined on the western side of the Bay, in the Southern Pacific Colliery). The trees, now silicified and still upstanding, are believed to have been buried in volcanic ash erupted from a volcano somewhere east of the present day coastline.

The Fennell Bay fossil forest was first recorded in 1834, in the writings of a famous missionary, the Reverend L.E. Threlkeld. The record is in his "An Australian Grammar: comprehending the principles and natural rules of the language, as spoken by the Aborigines in the vicinity of Hunter’s River, Lake Macquarie, &c., New South Wales" (Stephens & Stokes, Sydney, 1834, 131pp.). The following note on the fossil forest is contained therein on page 51: "Kurra-kurran, the name of a place in which there is almost a forest of petrifications of wood, of various sizes, extremely well defined. It is in a bay at the north-western extremity of Lake Macquarie. The tradition of the aborigines is, that formerly it was one large rock which fell from the heavens and killed a number of blacks who were assembled there; they had gathered themselves together in that spot by command of an immense iguana, which came down from heaven for that purpose; the iguana was angry at their having killed lice by roasting them in the fire; those who had killed the vermin by cracking them, had been previously speared to death by him with a long reed from Heaven! At that remote period, the moon was a man named Pontobug; and hence the moon is called he to the present day; but the sun, being formerly a woman, retains the feminine pronoun she. When the iguana saw all the men were killed by the fall of the stone, he ascended up into Heaven, where he is supposed to be now."

In 1842 the fossil forest was visited by the pastor of Parramatta, the Reverend W.B. Clarke (a.k.a. to some as "The Father of Australian Geology") who was highly impressed by it and wrote a paper on it. This paper, "On a Fossil Pine Forest at Kurrur-Kurran, in the inlet of Awaaba [Lake Macquarie], East Coast of Australia" was communicated to London, the then centre of the English-speaking geological world. It represents one of the very earliest serious geological deliberations to have come out of Australia. He communicated the matter to British colleagues via his patron at Cambridge University, Adam Sedgwick. Clarke sent two large sections of the silicified trees to England with his paper, and wrote in his covering note "I think you will not be displeased with this my first contribution from Australia".

At a time when evolution was not a terribly old or accepted theory, particularly within the religious fraternity, the Fennel Bay forest had a large impact on Reverend Clarke's mind, as he wrote the words "The train of thought which is excited by this scene is highly curious, and in few places in the world can the quiet and daily processes of natural growth and decay, the forms of living and dead things, and the successive changes and reproductions of matter, owing to the operations of most powerful though secretly evolving causes, be so prominently displayed, as in this singular picture of the past and the present".

== European history ==
The area was subdivided in 1882. Early industry included a sawmill and a mine. The first school opened in 1959, and the school today maintains an Aboriginal interpretative and cultural centre.
