= Cockle Creek Power Station =

Power station in New South Wales, Australia

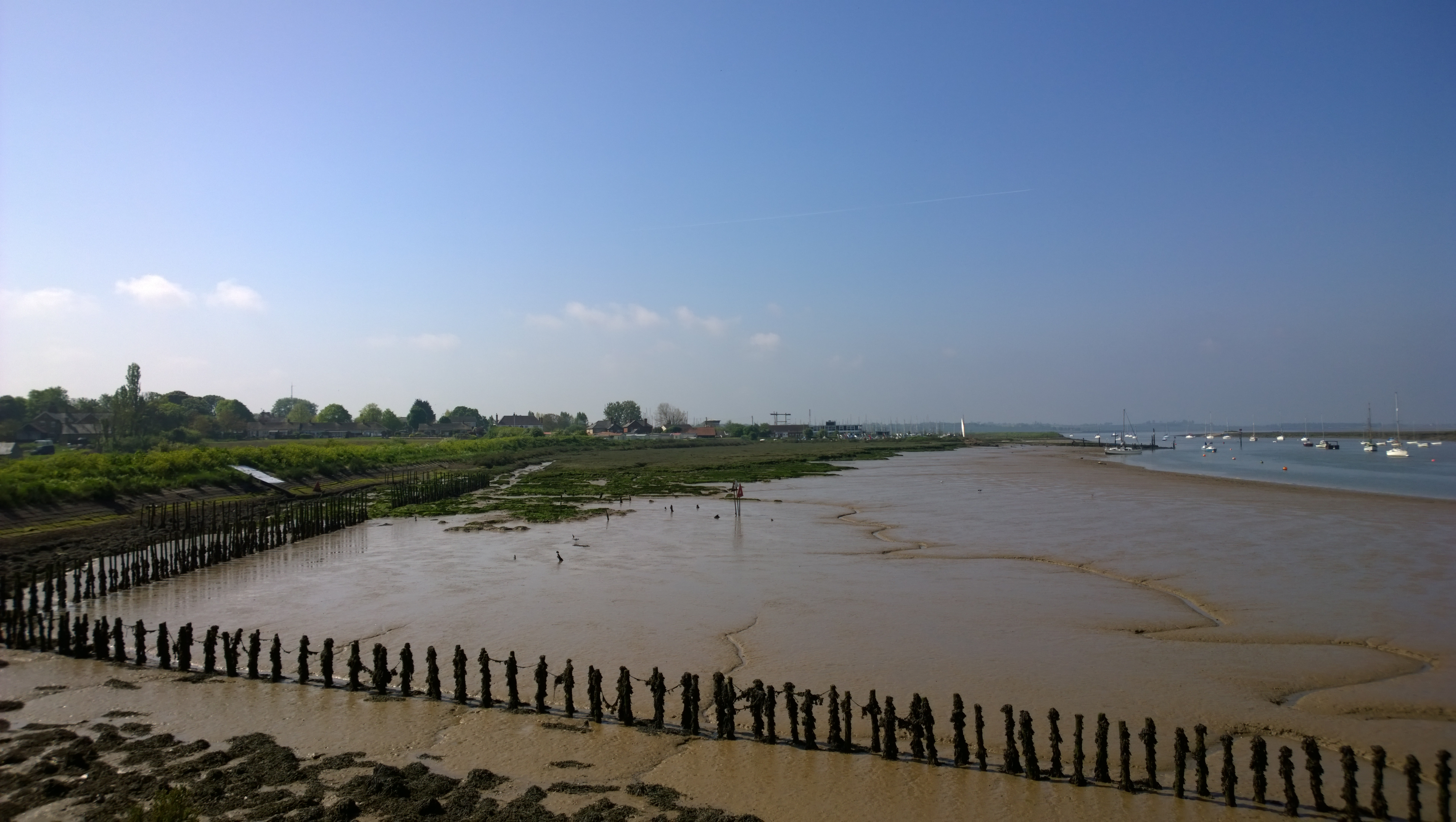
- Country: Australia
- Location: Teralba, New South Wales
- Coordinates: 32°56′30″S 151°36′23″E
- Status: Dismantled
- Commission date: 11 March 1927
- Decommission date: March 1976
- Owners: Caledonian Collieries Ltd (Coal & Allied from 1960)

Thermal power station
- Primary fuel: Coal

Power generation
- Make and model: Brown Boveri; Babock & Wilcox
- Units decommissioned: 3
- Nameplate capacity: 13.222 MW (peak capacity)

Cockle Creek Power Station was located in Teralba, New South Wales, Australia, on the banks of Cockle Creek. The power stationed operated from 11 March 1927 until March 1976.

== Description ==
The Cockle Creek power station was built by Caledonian Collieries Limited between 1925 and 1927 to use low grade coal to provide power to Caledonian Collieries mines and the surrounding townships in both the Lake Macquarie and Cessnock areas. A weir at Barnsley along Cockle Creek was constructed to supply cooling water for the power station.

The initial plant installed at the power station consisted of two Brown Boveri 5 MW turbo alternators with two Babock & Wilcox cross type marine water tube boilers. The two water tube boilers ran at a steam pressure of 215 pounds per square inch (1,480 kPa) with a capacity of 55,000 pounds (25,000 kg) of steam per hour each and were each fed by two Babock & Wilcox chain grate stokers. The power station building was constructed of brick except for one end wall which was clad in galvanised sheeting to allow for future expansion.

By 1936 with an increase in load requiring extra steam generating plant, a third boiler was ordered. This boiler was also built by Babcock & Wilcox and was a single drum cross type water tube boiler and ran at a steam pressure of 215 pounds per square inch (1,480 kPa) with a capacity of 38,000 pounds (17,000 kg) of steam per hour and was fed by a single chain grate stoker. By 1938 the load on the power station had increased to the stage where a third generator set was required. An order was placed with British-Thomson Houston for a 3.222 MW turbo alternator which was then numbered No.3 and was placed into service in March 1939.

Due to a failure at the Department of Railways New South Wales power station at Zaara Street in Newcastle in July 1941 the Department of Railways constructed a transmission line to join with the overland transmission line to Cessnock to allow Cockle Creek to supply power to the Railway's transmission grid.

With increased demand for power during the 1950s, a fourth boiler was ordered. This boiler was also built by Babcock & Wilcox and was a bi-drum radiant type water tube boiler and ran at a steam pressure of 415 pounds per square inch (2,860 kPa) with a capacity of 50,000 pounds (23,000 kg) of steam per hour and was fed by a single Babcock "Detroit" Rotograte stocker.

At its peak the power station had a capacity of 13.222 MW and provided electricity to 17 mines and to Teralba, Barnsley, Estelville, Wakefield, West Wallsend, Killingworth and Cessnock.

In May 1960 Caledonian Collieries amalgamated with J & A Brown and Abermain Seaham Collieries Ltd, with the new company being named Coal & Allied Industries Ltd. Soon afterwards a connection with the J & A Brown Richmond Main to Hexham transmission line was made to interconnect the output of the two power stations.

The power station was closed in March 1976 and was soon demolished.

== See also ==
- List of power stations in New South Wales
