= Teralba =

- Suburb
- Coordinates: 32°57′54″S 151°36′04″E
- Country: Australia
- State: New South Wales
- City: Greater Newcastle
- LGA: City of Lake Macquarie
- Location: 22 km (14 mi) WSW of Newcastle; 8 km (5.0 mi) N of Toronto
- Established: 1831

Government
  - State electorate: Lake Macquarie
  - Federal division: Hunter

Area
  - Total: 4.4 km^{2} (1.7 sq mi)

Population
  - Total: 2,652 (2021 census)
  - Density: 603/km^{2} (1,561/sq mi)
- Postcode: 2284
- Parish: Teralba
Suburbs around Teralba
Killingworth	Bolton Point	Argenton
Wakefield	Teralba	Speers Point
Fassifern	Woodrising	Booragul

Teralba is a town and suburb of Greater Newcastle, City of Lake Macquarie in New South Wales, Australia, between the towns of Speers Point and Booragul on the northern shoreline of Lake Macquarie. The town first came into being with the construction of the Homebush to Waratah Railway in the early 1880s.

== History ==
The Awabakal are the traditional people of this area.

Early industries included coal mining, gravel quarries and market gardens. Teralba railway station opened in 1887. The first meeting of the Lake Macquarie Shire Council was held in Teralba Court House in 1906.

A company called the Great Northern Coal Company was formed in the 1880s which leased 2,000 acres (8.1 km^{2}) which became known as the Great Northern Coal Company mine. It went through two more name changes before, finally, in 1914 becoming the Pacific Colliery.

Teralba Public school was opened in 1884. At the centre of the school was a school bell stolen on 24 April 2018. It had been used since the end of the 19th century. The bell was located in a memorial garden for Kevin Lester Peterson, opened by acting principal Mr Tattersal and Kevin Peterson's family. Kevin Peterson was the Principal of Teralba Public School from 1974 to 1986 and organised the school Centenary celebrations in 1984.

The hill to the south of Teralba is Billy Goat Hill. The area around Victoria Street was known as Monkey Town until the 1940s, supposedly due to a local resident possessing a pet monkey. The area around Rhondda Road was originally known as the "Gravel Pits".

Notable buildings in Teralba include the old mine manager's home at the top of Rodgers Street Teralba, A large house on Railway Street with the initials AS (Andrew Sneddon – Killed in action in World War I). This home was owned by the Frith family prominent local business family until the late 1990s. The Teralba Public school main building, built in 1898 for Teralba Colliery. On the waterfront at the corner of Anzac Parade is a large pale brick building now divided into small flats. This building was originally timber and called The Lake Maquarie Hotel until 1972 when it was clad and renovated.

The original Teralba grave yard (now in Booragul) is located on Billy Goat hill on the southern (bush side) of the railway station. Notable locals such as James Cherry, accidentally killed at Teralba Colliery. (Cherry's Bridge at Barnsley is named after this family). Members of the Sager family are also buried in this cemetery. Very little remains of the cemetery today.

Teralba main road was originally part of the main road from Toronto to Newcastle. The original Watkins Bridge was made of timber and crossed Cockle Creek from Race Course Road to Boolaroo via First, and later Second Street, Boolaroo . Some original piers are still visible. The name Watkins (local mayor) is now only remembered through a very small bridge near Blair Street and Watkins Lane off Railway Street.

Race Course Road is named after the race course that originally was located on the road near the weir on the way to Barnsley. The Aviator Kingsford Smith made an emergency landing on the race course. The first person on the scene was local boy Ernest (Ernie) Eade.

The weir between Teralba and Barnsley over Cockle Creek was built to support the Cockle Creek Power Station in the 1920s. The power station provided electricity to Teralba, Barnsley, Estelville (now Cameron Park), Wakefield, West Wallsend and Killingworth. The Power station was closed in 1976. The weir and the mine manager's home, the first house on the left on the way into Teralba after crossing the weir, are all that remain. The power station was located on the Teralba side of the creek on the right-hand side on the way in to Teralba.

The power station received its coal from the Rhondda coal mine by rail. The remains of this railway line can still be followed. The track has been removed and the original locomotives were taken away in the 1980s. However the bridge still exists and the track can be followed from the waste treatment plant (now all that exists in Rhondda – town demolished in the 1950s after mine closure) to the site of the old power station. Caution should be taken in this area, and the track should not be left if exploring due to dangerous mine subsidence.
