= Booragul =

- Suburb
- Coordinates: 32°56′S 151°37′E
- Country: Australia
- State: New South Wales
- City: Greater Newcastle
- LGA: City of Lake Macquarie
- Location: 21 km (13 mi) WSW of Newcastle
- Established: 1829

Government
  - State electorate: Lake Macquarie
  - Federal division: Hunter

Area
  - Total: 1.2 km^{2} (0.46 sq mi)

Population
  - Total: 1,415 (2011 census)
  - Density: 1,180/km^{2} (3,050/sq mi)
- Postcode: 2284
- Parish: Awaba
Suburbs around Booragul
Teralba	Teralba	Lake Macquarie
Fennell Bay	Booragul	Lake Macquarie
Woodrising	Marmong Point	Marmong Point

Booragul is a suburb of the City of Lake Macquarie, Greater Newcastle in New South Wales, Australia, and is located north-northeast of the town of Toronto on the western shore Lake Macquarie.

Booragul railway station is on the Central Coast & Newcastle Line.

== History ==
The Aboriginal people, in this area, the Awabakal, were the first people of this land.

A slaughterhouse was among the early industries of Booragul. Booragul Public School opened in 1955. Booragul High opened in 1958. Post World War 2, 72 houses in Ellesmere Street, Primrose Street, Farlow Street and Gainford Street were constructed for migrant accommodation. Some of these houses were later used as married quarter accommodation for the Australian Army and Royal Australian Air Force. This housing was sold off in the late 1970s and early 1980s.
