= Dobell House =

- Location within New South Wales Location within Australia
- 33°04′16″S 151°35′05″E
- Location: 47 Dobell Drive, Wangi Wangi, City of Lake Macquarie, New South Wales, Australia

History
- Built: 1925–1970

New South Wales Heritage Register
- Official name: Dobell House; Allawah
- Type: State heritage (complex / group)
- Designated: 3 February 2017
- Reference no.: 1985
- Type: Other - Residential Buildings
- Category: Residential buildings
- Builders: Robert Dobell

Dobell House is a heritage-listed former residence and now house museum at 47 Dobell Drive, Wangi Wangi in the Hunter region of New South Wales, Australia. It was built from 1925 to 1970 by Robert Dobell, the father of noted Australian artist, William Dobell. The house is also known as Allawah and was added to the New South Wales State Heritage Register on 3 February 2017.

== History ==
The original section of the house (Allawah) was built as a weekender in 1924 by William Dobell's father, Robert. William Dobell, a trained architect, designed the building and his brother helped their father construct it. Due to limited overland access, the majority of building materials was transported to the site by boat. Gravel from the lakeshore was used in the concrete mix. William Dobell purchased the house from his father's estate in 1942 and lived in the house until his death in 1970.

William Dobell was born in Newcastle in 1899, and studied technical drawing in Newcastle before being articled to an architect in 1916. He moved to Sydney in 1929, where he studied art, attending evening classes. That year he won the Artists Travelling Scholarship and went to England and Europe for further study, returning to Australia in 1938. Dobell worked as a war artist for the Australian Government during World War II. A portrait, Mr Joshua Smith, of Joshua Smith, a colleague with whom he shared a tent during the war, was entered in the Archibald Prize, winning in 1943. It was a controversial result. Two artists from Victoria took legal action against Dobell and the Art Gallery of New South Wales, claiming that the painting was a caricature and not within the traditional guidelines of the competition.

The final Supreme Court finding was in the artist's favour, but the lengthy proceedings had an effect on Dobell's health, and he retired to Wangi Wangi (commonly called Wangi) to recuperate. He kept a flat at Kings Cross until around 1950, and at this time the house at Wangi became his permanent home. Dobell began painting again at Wangi, and as he preferred to paint in privacy he added a second storey studio to the house, in 1946. This kept his working environment separate from visitors, whose numbers increased as he became more famous.

From around 1950, until his death in 1970, Dobell painted entirely at his home in Wangi. Making sketches and photographing the people or scenes he wished to paint, he returned to his studio to do the painting. Dobell painted landscape scenes of Wangi, which include The Westerly Breeze, The Narrows Beach and Storm Approaching Wangi (1948). The latter was of a view from the patio of his house, across the water of Lake Macquarie, and won the Wynne prize for landscape in 1948. The artist won two further Archibald Prizes in 1948 and 1959, one with a portrait of fellow artist, Margaret Olley, and the other with a painting of his surgeon, Dr McMahon. He also painted two works for Prince Phillip's Royal Collection. Dobell received a knighthood in 1966.

Although he had plans for further additions, Dobell had done little to maintain the house and at the time of his death it was in a poor state of repair.

"He used the crowded studio to store his paintings and only painted in his living room, near his front door. Lighting was poor and the facilities were minimal reflecting the simple life that its occupants had preferred. There were few power outlets although the house did have a wall air conditioner in the southern sunroom and strip heaters in the living areas and bathroom. There was no insulation and large areas of glass resulted in extremes of heat and cold across the seasons. The timber floors were bare boards with a few carpet pieces, or covered with degraded vinyl-asbestos tiles."

— Elizabeth Donaldson and Robert Donaldson, William Dobell, His Life, Art and Home. 2011, p122.

Dobell had been popular with the local community while living at Wangi, and had involved himself in community activities. After his death in 1970, members of the Wangi community formed the "Sir William Dobell Memorial Committee", and raised the money necessary to purchase Dobell's house, which has been open to the public since 1971 as a house museum.

== Description ==
Dobell House is an eclectic building with a series of additions to the original two-room holiday house. The primary facade is oriented north to take advantage of views to Lake Macquarie. The rear of the house and garage address Dobell Road.

The original portion of the house (Allawah) was a vernacular bungalow with Federation/Interwar stylistic features. A prominent gable with decorative frieze was supported on bracketed, dwarf posts, in turn resting on masonry verandah piers. A low, masonry wall extended between verandah piers. All walls were finished with a roughcast render. The gable and verandah remain as the most recognisable features of the early building. The gable end is filled with profiled metal sheeting, which replaced the earlier battened sheeting.

The walls of the original bungalow are interesting as an early use of slipform (jump-form) concrete. thirty centimetres (twelve inches) boards were used as formwork, taken apart when the concrete had set, and reassembled at the next level. Evidence of this construction technique is now covered up, however it was noted and recorded during installation of a chemical damp-proof course, by architect Robert Donaldson in 2003–4. Shell, seaweed and fishbones were found in the concrete walls confirming that sand and gravel from lakeshore was used in the construction.

The additions at the rear (south) comprise the 1930s ground floor living area with kitchen and the 1946 second storey studio space. The ground storey is constructed of rendered brickwork and it is likely that it was built by Robert Dobell and his sons. The studio is timber-framed and clad in asbestos-cement sheet. The structure of the fireplace rising from the ground floor allowed a fireplace to be added to the studio level . The studio has a collection of windows of differing shapes and sizes that were designed to allow the amount and type of light Dobell needed for his painting: a large, aluminium sliding sash window facing south; a strip of fixed glazing on the east wall, located below eye level at desk height; corner pair of timber, sliding sash windows on southeast corner; two small, top-hinged casement windows to the north.

The existing pitched roof of the studio, clad in corrugated steel, was installed c 1958, replacing the original flat roof with parapets. The gable ends are filled with horizontal boarding and the street-facing gable is decorated with a carved timber embellishment that seems out of place with the otherwise austere lines of the studio.

The western addition of 1952, is timber-framed and lined with asbestos-cement sheeting and contained sister Alice's bedroom, a bathroom and kitchen. Interesting features of the western addition are the 1950s fitout of the bathroom and kitchen.

The garage incorporates a 1960s metal carport that was, soon after, enclosed with timber-framing and profiled fibro sheeting. The roof is clad in corrugated iron.

The garden contains a number of mature trees, including a prominent Jacaranda. The southern garden includes plant material that Dobell brought back from New Guinea in 1947. These are now substantial trees and include an Irish Strawberry Tree, Guava, Feijoa and a number of Frangipani.

Rendered brick retaining walls surround the property on three sides, with four different types of railings and balustrades used. The rendered walls and railings have all been introduced since the 1950s, replacing the original timber picket fence that is extant in photographs from the 1950s.

The plain white colour scheme of the house/studio, garage and boundary walls serves to unify the somewhat incongruous forms, materials and details of the whole ensemble.

The contents of the house were removed at the time of Dobell's death but many items have since been returned. They include various cane chairs and table, a cane peacock chair and various brass and wooden items. The studio houses several of Dobell's easels, bed, paint boxes, tubes and brushes, secretaire and other paraphernalia. Other items in the house include Dobell's Brinsmead grand piano, his photographic equipment, household items such as china and glassware, personal effects and memorabilia. There is also a small collection of original Dobell works: sketches, studies, Christmas cards and cartoons drawn for friends. The Dobell House Archive, housed in the garage serving as committee office, includes reference material such as books, articles, photographs, scrapbooks kept by relatives, colour slides and film.

The door between Alice's bedroom and the adjoining bathroom was decorated by Dobell with a number of randomly arranged small paintings: a rose, pansy, butterflies, pomegranates. The lack of cohesion of the separate paintings on the door reflects the disjointed quality in the design of the building additions. This is unlike the composition and balance evident in Dobell's portraits and landscape.

=== Condition ===
As at 12 January 2016, the house appears to be structurally sound and watertight. The quality of the construction is variable, the earlier fabric appearing to be of a better quality of construction than the later fabric. Some of the later works carried out during Dobell's ownership are of inferior quality and have a somewhat haphazard appearance in the way the materials are put together. There is potential in these areas for the fabric to fail.

At the time of his death, Dobell had done little to maintain the house and it was in a poor state of repair. Extensive repairs and reconstruction have been carried out since 1970 by the Sir William Dobell Memorial Committee, primarily to waterproof the building and replace damaged elements. The simple and well-worn quality of the interiors has been retained.

=== Modifications and dates ===
- 1930s – southern addition including kitchen.
- 1946 – second storey studio addition.
- 1960s – western addition.
- c. 1958 – flat roof with bituminous membrane replaced with pitched roof clad in corrugated steel; timber fencing replaced by rendered, masonry walls.
- 1960s western addition.
- c. 1965 – earlier steel-framed carport structure was converted to a garage, incorporating a laundry space. A southern balcony was added to the studio.
- 1971-2 – internal stair to studio replaced; electrical wiring and guttering renewed; and the house repainted.
- 1999 – studio roof replaced.
- 2000 – re-roofing of the house and garage; waterproofing and re-tiling of the studio balcony.
- 2003-4 – chemical damp-proofing of the 1925 walls. Replacement of northern boundary wall, northern pergola and western Fernery structure.
- 2004 – redevelopment of the southern garden.
- 2008 – repainting, using original colour scheme.

== Heritage listing ==
As at 11 July 2016, Dobell House is of state significance for its strong association with prominent Australian artist William Dobell and his work. As well as being Dobell's home from 1942 to 1970, it was also the place where he painted numerous works including Storm Approaching Wangi, Dr McMahon and series of portraits of cosmetician Helena Rubenstein.

Dobell House is significant as the centre of the artist's creative work, as he rarely painted away from his home. From 1950 until his death, virtually all his paintings were made here. The house, studio and garden frame the views that inspired his landscape paintings. Views from the place appear as the subject or background in paintings, including, The Westerly Breeze (1948), Wynne prize-winning Storm Approaching Wangi (1948) and Wangi Scene (1949). Elements of the building and its contents, such as the verandah and the cane furniture, also appear in his paintings. Much of Dobell's furniture, which reflects his travels and his work as a painter, remains in the house.

Dobell House is further associated with the artist, having been designed by Dobell, originally as a two-room weekender, then modified by him, through the series of additions which included the second-storey studio.

Dobell House was listed on the New South Wales State Heritage Register on 3 February 2017 having satisfied the following criteria.

The place has a strong or special association with a person, or group of persons, of importance of cultural or natural history of New South Wales's history.

Dobell House and studio is of state significance for its strong association with seminal Australian artist William Dobell. The house was Dobell's home and studio from 1942 to 1970. It was where he produced his later works, including Storm Approaching Wangi, 1948 (Wynne Prize for Landscape); Dr E. G. McMahon, 1959 (Archibald Prize), and the series of portraits of cosmetician, Helena Rubenstein.

Dobell used two studios for a period of time, Dobell House and the Kings Cross flat but he surrendered the lease to the Sydney flat in 1950 and from that time Wangi became his permanent address. The flat has been remodelled by later occupants, leaving Dobell House as the only studio that remains in much the same form as when last used by the artist.

The artist's reluctance to paint in public meant that his home was the centre of his creative work. During an interview with Garth Nettheim Dobell said, "I've never been able to go out and paint. I've never liked drawing or painting in public. I can't bring myself to do that. So anything that I've done in the way of landscapes has been from memory or rapid little pencil drawings on the spot."

Views from the house became the subject or background to many of Dobell's later works. He painted scenes of Lake Macquarie and landscapes of the Wangi area, as they appeared from his house and studio. Elements of the building and contents, such as the verandah and the cane furniture were incorporated in his paintings.

Dobell House is further associated with the artist having been designed by Dobell, initially as a two-room weekender, then modified by him through a series of additions which included the second-storey studio.

The place has a strong or special association with a particular community or cultural group in New South Wales for social, cultural or spiritual reasons.

The place is significant to the contemporary community of Wangi Wangi for its association with William Dobell. The place strengthens the sense of place held by the residents of Wangi. A group of Wangi Wangi residents formed the "Sir William Dobell Memorial Committee" after Dobell's death and raised the money to purchase the house and run it as a house museum.

Dobell House meets this criterion at a local level.

The place has potential to yield information that will contribute to an understanding of the cultural or natural history of New South Wales.

Dobell House is of state significance for its potential to yield further information about Dobell, hence contribute to a greater understanding of the cultural history of Wangi Wangi and NSW.

Dobell House is not notable for aesthetic or artistic merit. Its haphazard, sometimes inferior construction and its degraded finishes have the potential to give some insight to the character of the artist who chose to live simply, with minimal facilities and comforts.

The elegant composition and balance evident in Dobell's portraits and landscapes, when contrasted with the disjointed nature of the building additions he designed for Dobell House and elements such as the disparate quality of the individual paintings on Alice's bedroom door, may have the potential to shed light on the nature of Dobell's artistic talent.

The place, including the house, studio and garden, is a source for aspects of the artist's life that are not available in other records or his body of work and which could assist in the ongoing discussion and assessment of his contribution to Australian Art.

== See also ==
- Australian residential architectural styles
- Storm Approaching Wangi
- Mr Joshua Smith
