= Carey Bay =

- Suburb
- Coordinates: 33°01′44″S 151°36′36″E
- Country: Australia
- State: New South Wales
- LGA: City of Lake Macquarie
- Location: 2 km (1.2 mi) SE of Toronto

Government
  - State electorate: Lake Macquarie
  - Federal division: Hunter

Area
  - Total: 0.5 km^{2} (0.19 sq mi)

Population
  - Total: 865 (2021 census)
  - Density: 1,730/km^{2} (4,500/sq mi)
- Postcode: 2283
- Parish: Awaba
Suburbs around Carey Bay
Kilaben Bay	Toronto	Lake Macquarie
Kilaben Bay	Carey Bay	Lake Macquarie
	Coal Point	Coal Point

Carey Bay is a suburb of the City of Lake Macquarie in New South Wales, Australia, and is located on a peninsula southeast of the town of Toronto on the western side of Lake Macquarie.

The spelling "Cary Bay" was gazetted on 31 August 1973, but was gazetted and signed "Carey Bay" on 31 May 1991 when the boundaries were determined. In 2001, the Lake Macquarie City Council voted to use the latter name for the suburb.

Carey Bay was named after William Cary of the Excelsior Land Investment and Building Company and Bank Limited.

Excelsior Land was an early property developer of the Toronto district in Lake Macquarie releasing subdivisions from 1887. William Cary was a director of the company for twelve years from 1880.

Originally named "Cary Bay" and describing only a geographical feature of the coastline of Lake Macquarie, the growth of the area lead to the creation of the suburb of the same name with a change of spelling to "Carey Bay", gazetted as such in 1991.

Dewey Point is located at the north-eastern corner of Carey Bay and forms the boundary between the suburbs of Carey Bay and Toronto.
