= Teralba railway station =

Railway station in New South Wales, Australia

Teralba
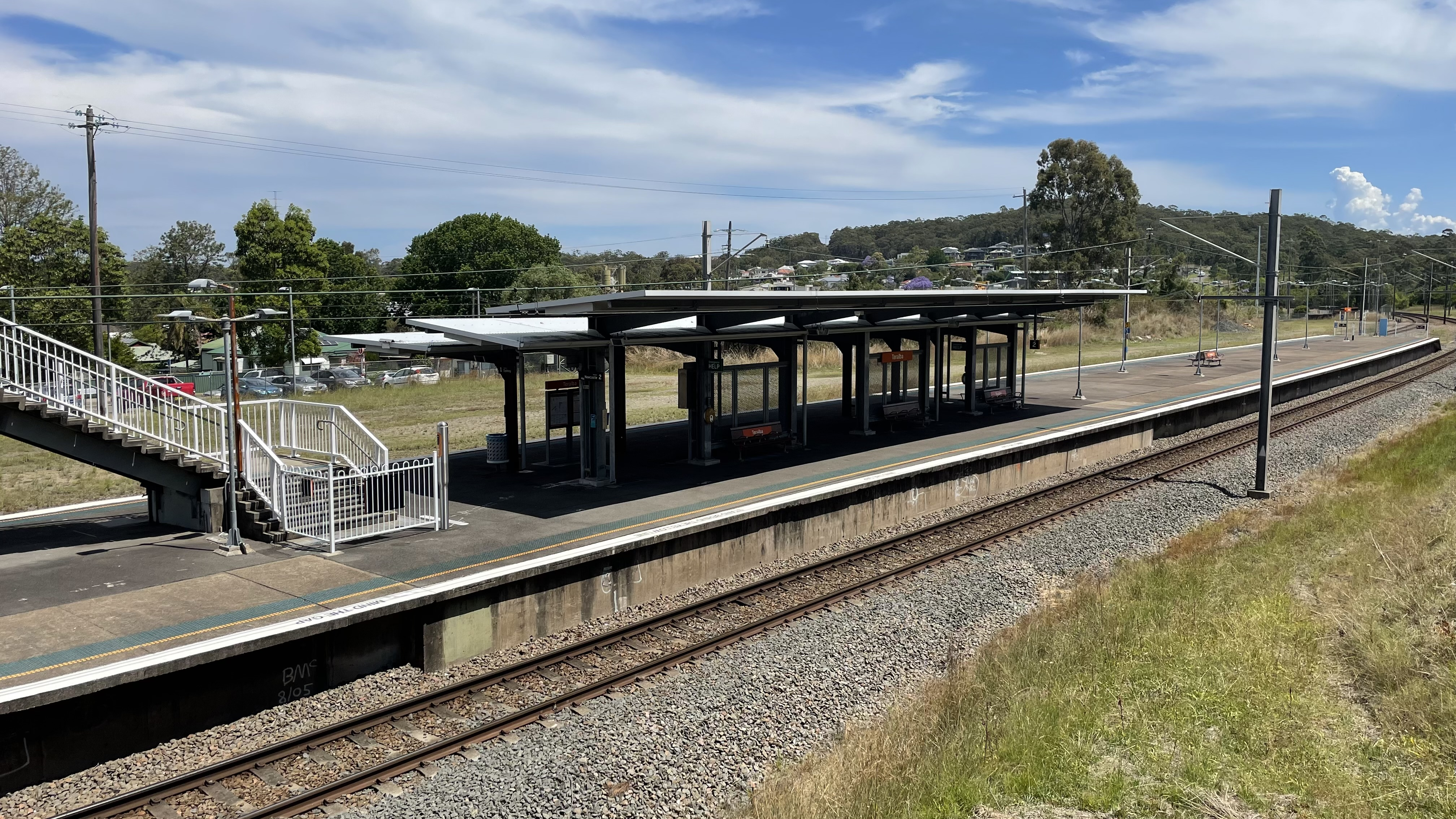
- South-west bound view of the station platforms, November 2023

General information
- Location: William Street, Teralba; Australia
- Coordinates: 32°57′45″S 151°36′12″E
- Owner: Transport Asset Manager of New South Wales
- Operator: Sydney Trains
- Line: Main Northern
- Distance: 147.57 km (91.70 mi) from Central
- Platforms: 2 (1 island)
- Tracks: 2
- Connections: Bus

Construction
- Structure type: Ground
- Accessible: No

Other information
- Station code: TBR
- Website: Transport for NSW

Passengers
- 2025: 24,469 (year); 67 (daily) (Sydney Trains, NSW TrainLink)

Services
Preceding station	Intercity Trains	Following station
Cockle Creek towards Newcastle Interchange	Central Coast & Newcastle Line	Booragul towards Central
Location

Teralba railway station is located on the Main Northern line in New South Wales, Australia. It serves the City of Lake Macquarie suburb of Teralba.

As part of the electrification of the line in the early 1980s, the northbound platform was removed and the southbound platform converted to an island platform to allow the line south of the station to be realigned for faster speeds. The prominent signal box on top of the island platform was removed at the same time. In 2011, the station building was demolished and replaced by a waiting shed.

== Platforms and services ==
Teralba has one island platform with two faces. It is serviced by Sydney Trains Intercity Central Coast & Newcastle Line services travelling between Sydney Central, Gosford and Newcastle.

Platform	Line	Stopping pattern	Notes
1	CCN	Services to Gosford & Sydney Central	
2	CCN	Services to Newcastle	

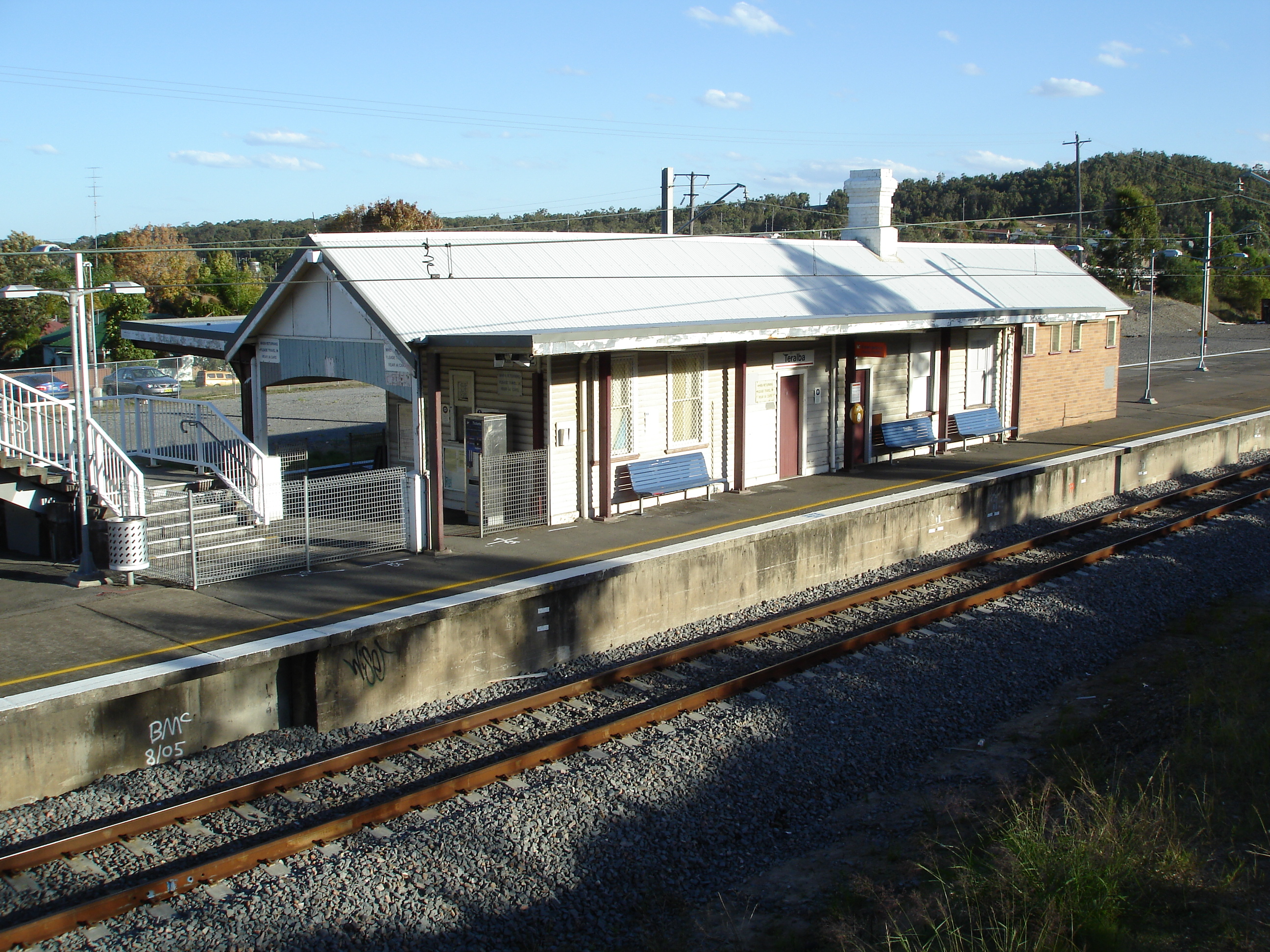
Previous station building in May 2006

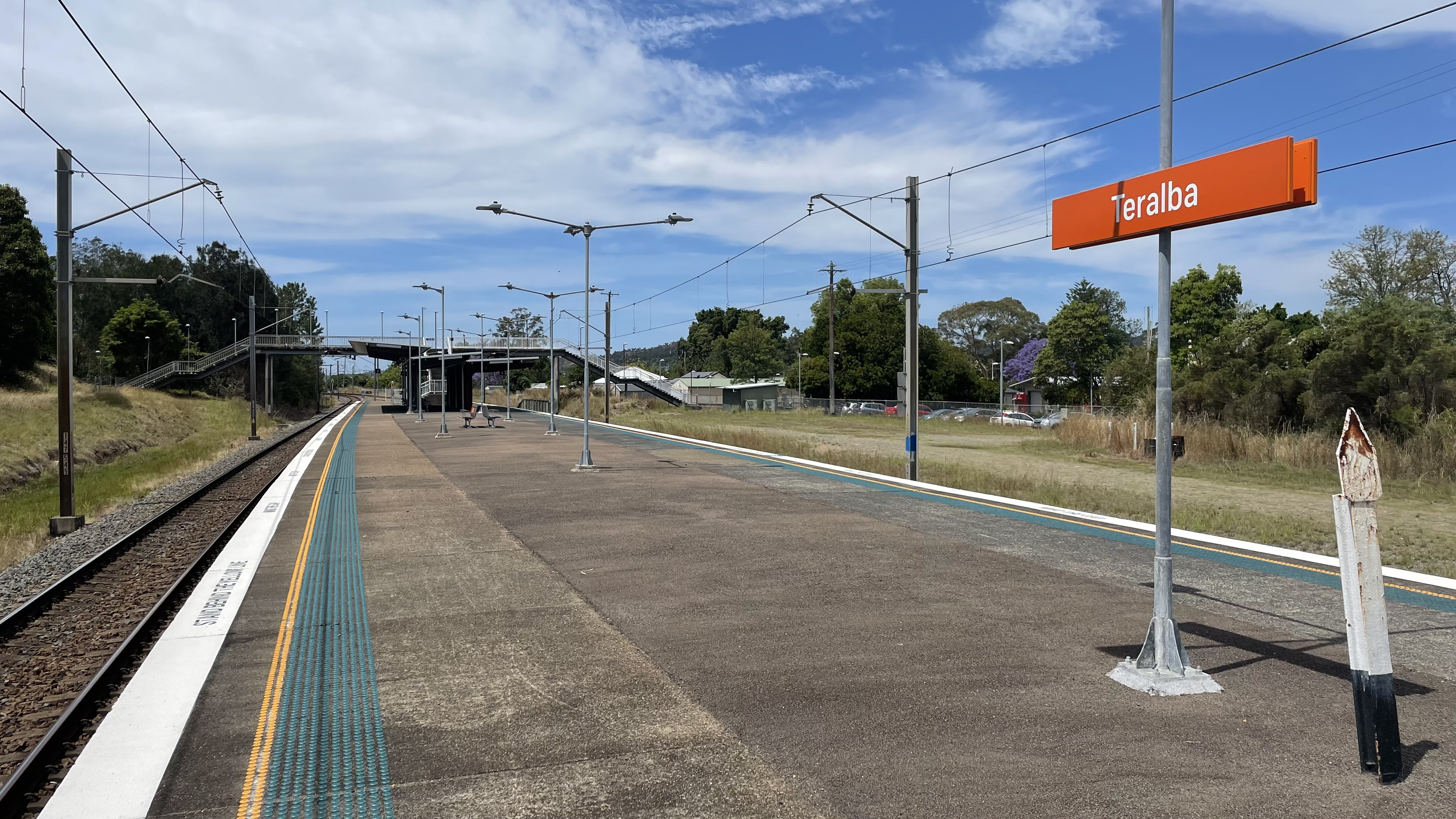
Northbound view from platforms

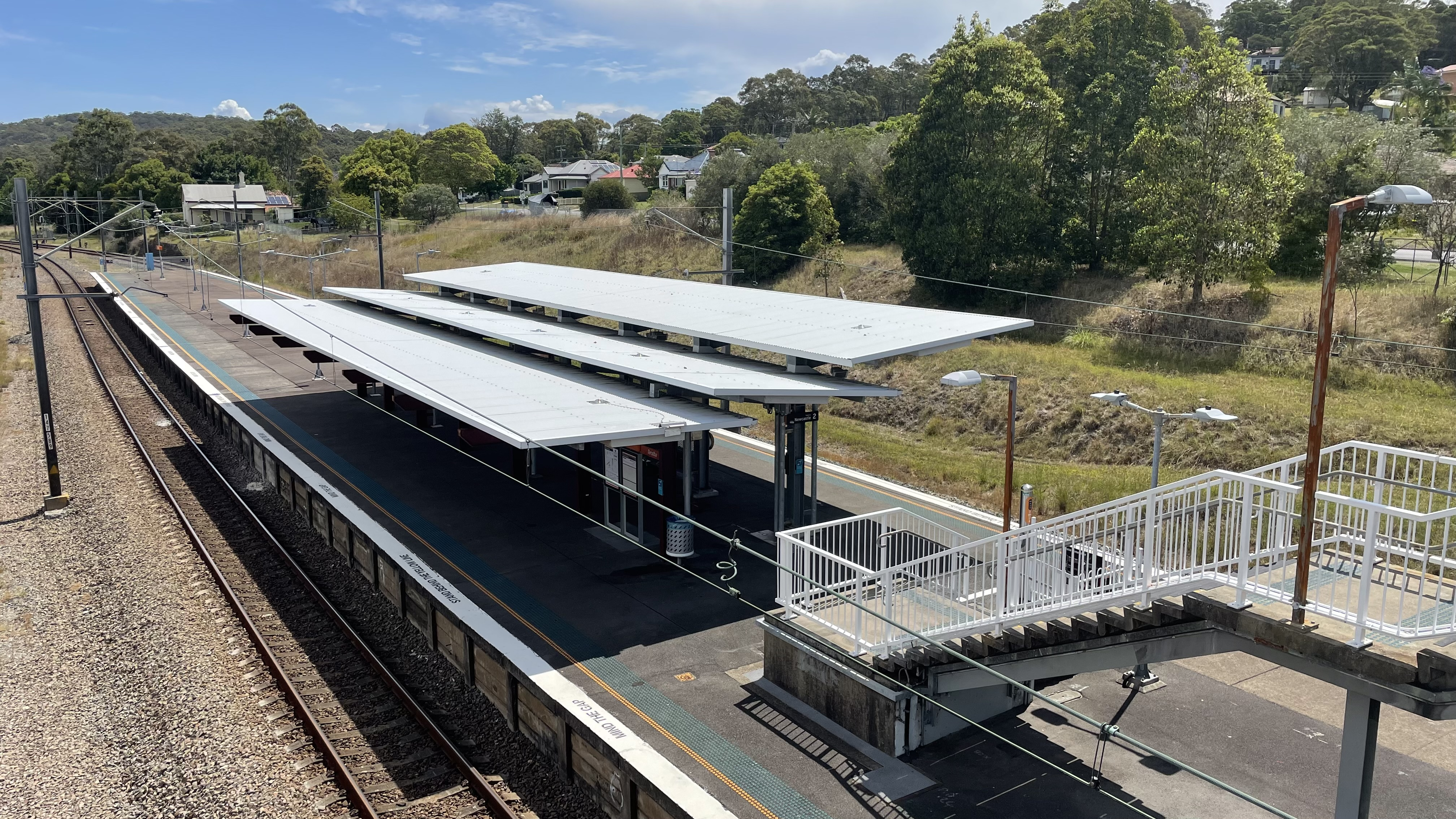
View from footbridge to island platforms

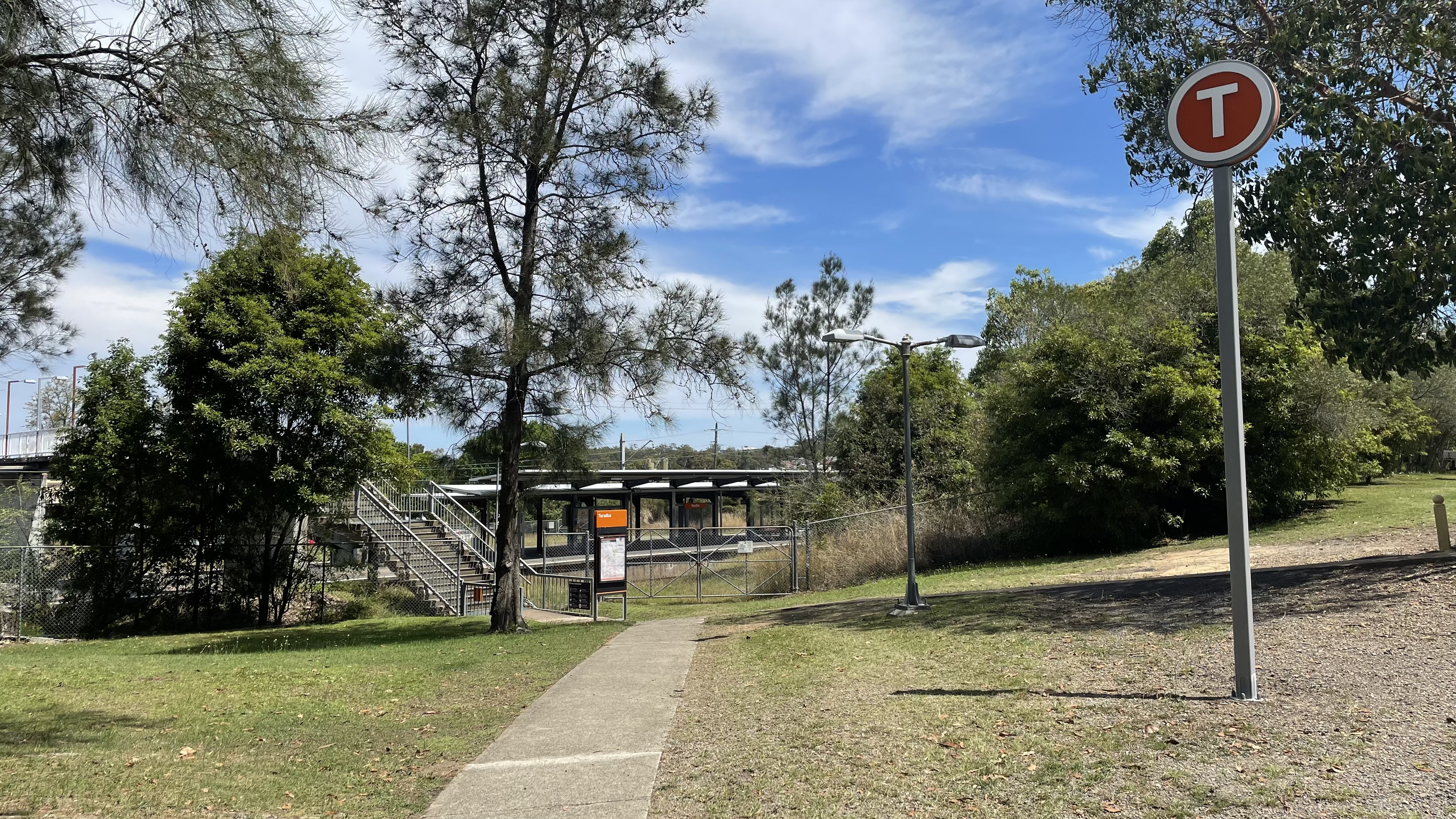
Entrance from Railway Street

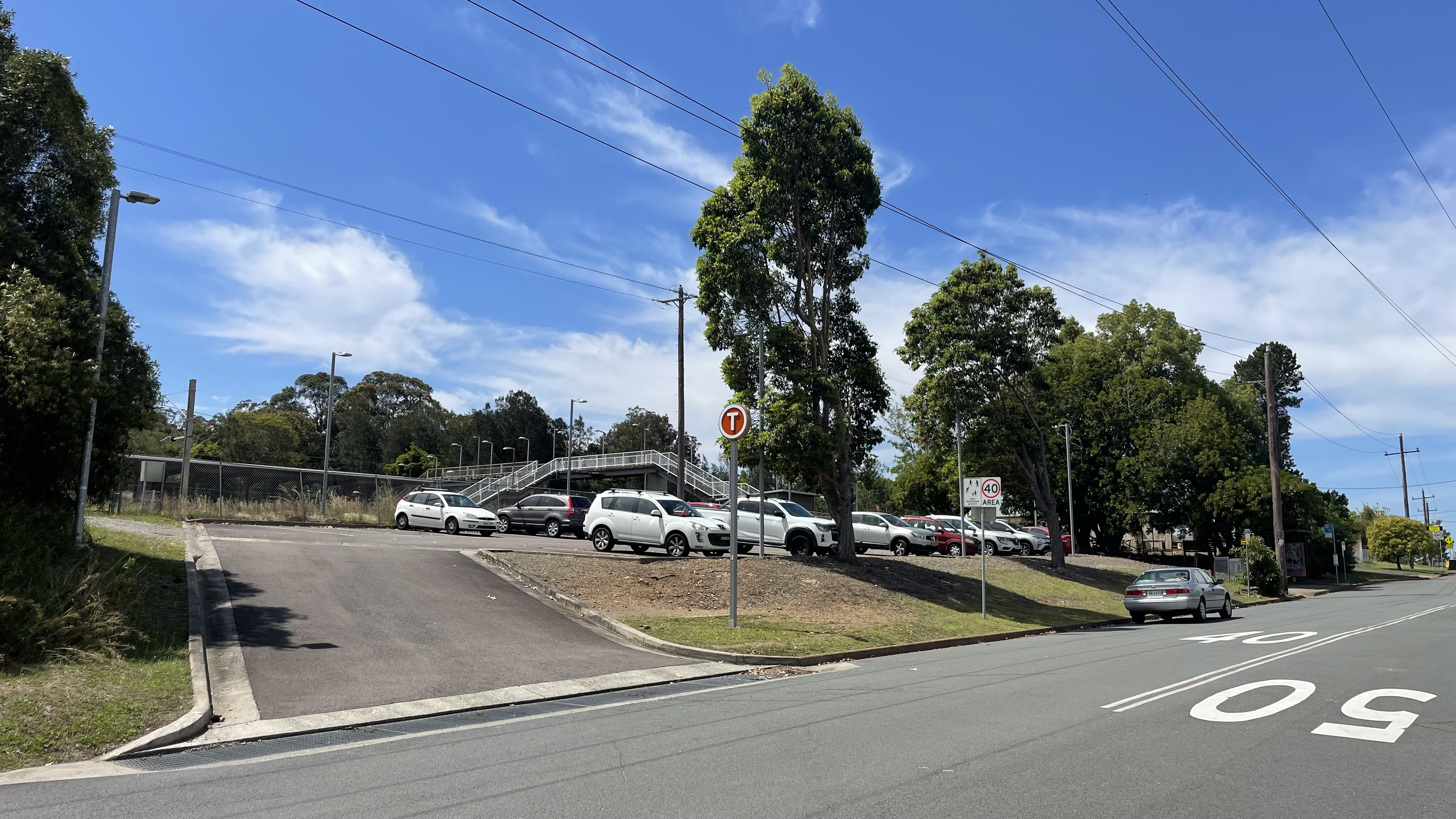
Entrance from William Street

== Transport links ==
Hunter Valley Buses operates two bus routes via Teralba station, under contract to Transport for NSW:

- 270: Toronto West to University of Newcastle
- 271: Toronto to Stockland Glendale
