= Lake Macquarie Petrified Forest =

Petrified pine tree forest in Australia

Coordinates: 33.087838°S 151.665144°E

The Lake Macquarie Petrified Forest is a petrified pine tree forest at Fennell Bay, Lake Macquarie, New South Wales, Australia. Geologically it is located in the Permo-Carboniferous strata. The nearest town is Swansea.

The petrified forest was first referred to in print (as Kurrur Kurran) within a grammar of the local Aboriginal people published in Sydney in 1834 by missionary minister Lancelot Threlkeld. The scientific aspects of the site were first addressed in detail by the geologist priest William Clarke, who visited the area in 1842 and prepared a detailed report which was subsequently presented to the Geological Society of London and published in its proceedings for 1843.

The fossil forest (Kurrur Kurran) was in 2009 nominated to the State Government as being State significant heritage, but has not yet been listed as such. In the meantime, the best available scientific collection of silicified wood from the fossil forest (itself listed as local heritage) passed to the care of the City of Lake Macquarie which, after keeping it for some time, disposed of it into the lake without notifying any of the geologists interested in or studying the fossil tree horizon.

The fossil tree horizon extends at least as far as the coast, where it can be found a little to the south of Catherine Hill Bay. Work continues trying to trace if this might be a very extensive horizon traceable right across the preserved Sydney Basin (e.g. to Marrangaroo in the west).

It has been generally accepted that the trees were both killed and buried (preserved) by ash from a volcanic eruption, likely occurring somewhere well off the present eastern coastline.
