= Wangi Power Station =

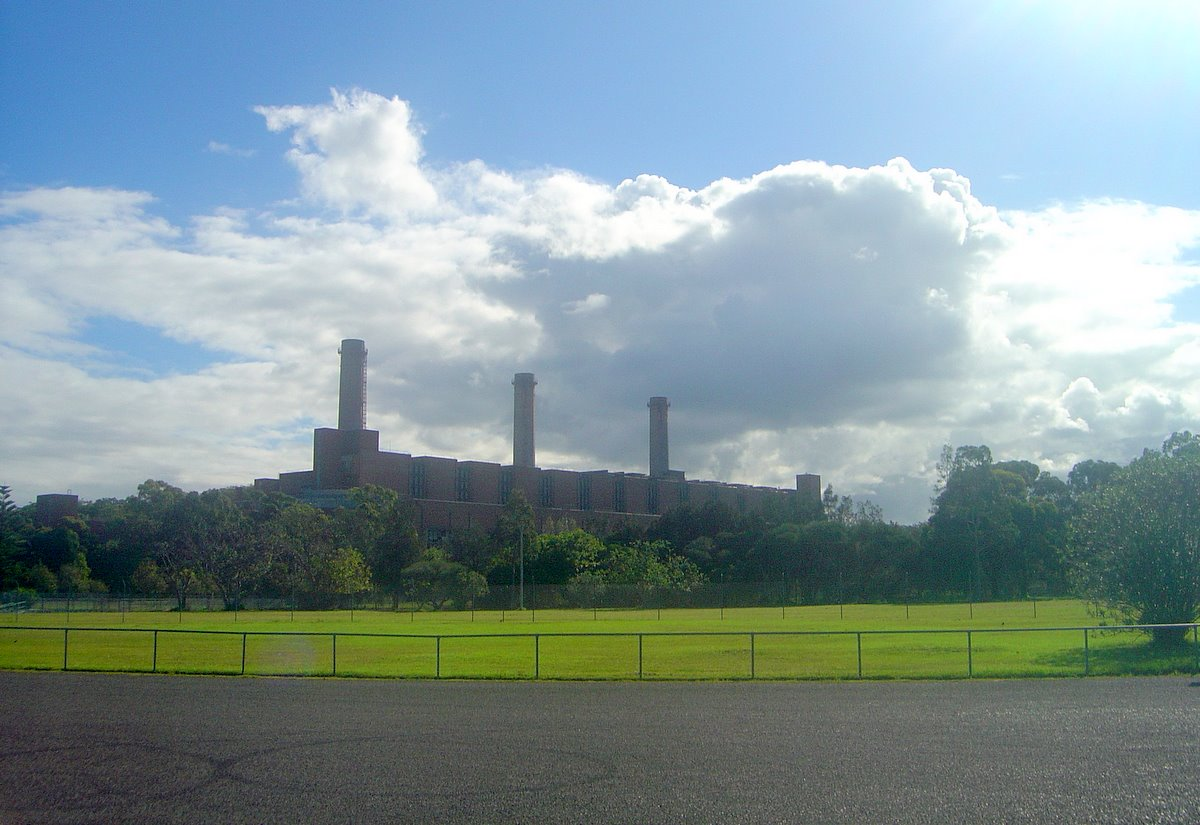
- Wangi Wangi Power Station, 2007

- Location within New South Wales Location within Australia
- 33.0632°S 151.5708°E
- Location: Wangi Wangi, City of Lake Macquarie, New South Wales, Australia

History
- Built: 1949–1960

Site notes
- Architect(s): Railways NSW architect (unknown) & Colin Smith of CH Smith & Johnson Architects
- Owner: Centennial Fassifern Pty Ltd; Department of Trade & Investment, Regional Infrastructure & Services; IJ McDonald Pty Ltd; National Parks and Wildlife Service

New South Wales Heritage Register
- Official name: Wangi Power Station Complex
- Type: state heritage (built)
- Designated: 2 April 1999
- Reference no.: 1014
- Type: Electricity Generator/Power Station - coal/gas/oil
- Category: Utilities - Electricity
- Builders: several

Wangi Power Station is a heritage-listed former coal-fired power station at Wangi Wangi, City of Lake Macquarie, New South Wales on Lake Macquarie. The power station operated between 1956 and 1986 and supplied electricity to New South Wales. It was once the largest in the state. The 12,000-square-metre (130,000 ft^{2}) building was listed on the New South Wales State Heritage Register on 2 April 1999.

== History ==
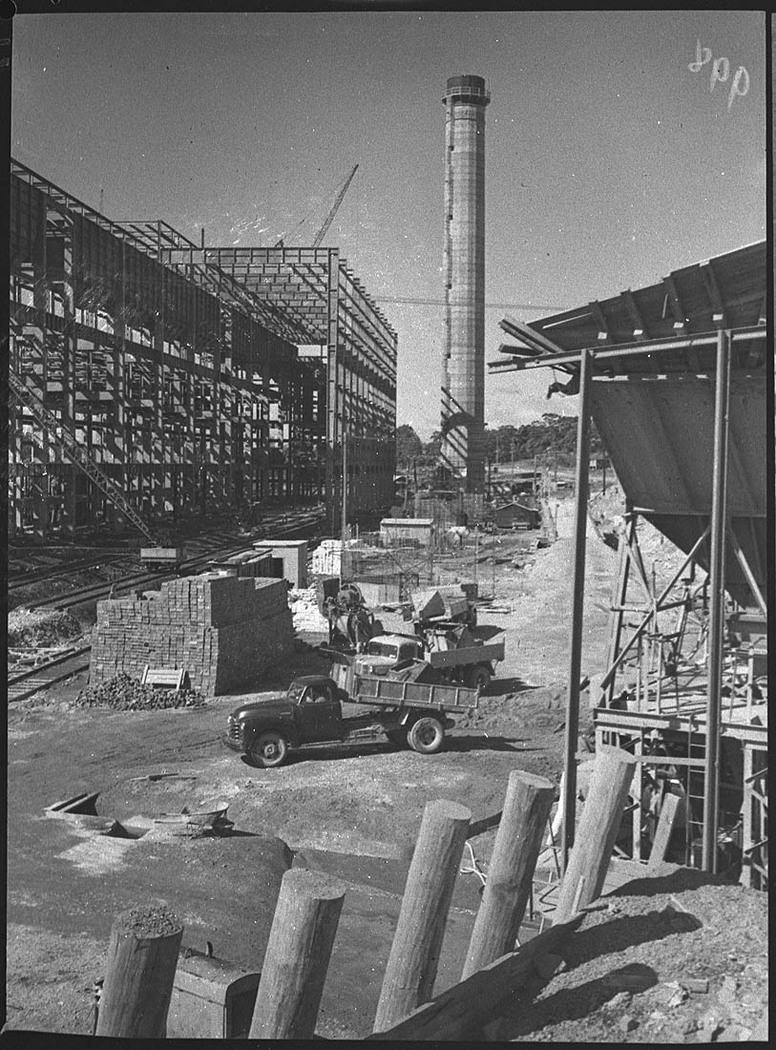
The power station under construction

In 1946, the New South Wales Government approved the construction of the power station on Lake Macquarie at Wangi Wangi by the New South Wales Government Railways. Wangi Wangi was chosen for its proximity to a large body of water and coalfields. The power station was officially opened on 7 November 1958 by the NSW Premier, Joseph Cahill, after ten years of construction and two years of progressive commissioning of the six turbo-alternators from C. A. Parsons and Company, which gave it a capacity of 330 MW. One thousand men camped in Wangi Wangi during the peak construction period.

Wangi Power Station played an eminent part in relieving New South Wales of drastic power shortages during the late 1950s and playing a major role in restoring power supply to New South Wales after the total state power shutdown of 10 June 1964. Wangi Power Station was decommissioned in 1986, approximately thirty years after the first turbo-alternator commenced operation. The greater part of the generating equipment was removed by the early 1990s.

While the generating equipment has been removed, the main buildings and emission stacks still stand as of 19 May 2019. The site has been subject to proposals for redevelopment into residential and retail properties since the 1990s.

=== 'A' Station - 150 MW ===
Wangi 'A' Station consisted of three 50 MW Parsons turbo-alternators. Steam was supplied at 650PSI and 840degF from six spreader-stoker coal-fired Babcock & Wilcox (UK) (now Babcock International) cross drum boilers. The firing system consisted of the Spreader Stoker and Babcock & Wilcox Detroit Rotograte. Rapidly rotating blades of the spreader feeder unit flung coal of the required size onto the rotograte, with a large percentage igniting before landing on the grate. The amount of coal feed could be regulated by varying the length of the stroke of the pusher plate supplying fuel to the coal feeder. There were two rotogrates fitted which consisted of two endless chains carrying transverse grate bars in a revolving action. Eight coal feeder units controlled through Reeves variable speed control drive. Each boiler had an output of 180,000 lb/h. It was a project of New South Wales Government Railways, but control was transferred before its completion to the Electricity Commission of New South Wales, which was formed in 1950.

=== 'B' Station - 180 MW ===
The later 'B' Station, a modified product of the Electricity Commission of New South Wales, had three 60 MW Parsons units. Steam was supplied by 3 Babcock & Wilcox boilers that burnt pulverised coal. Steam pressure was 950PSI and steam temperature was 950 deg F. It was unit type plant and each boiler supplied 550,000 lb/h of steam to one turbine only.

To reduce visible emissions, the electrostatic precipitators of 'A' Station were upgraded to shaker-type fabric filters, and those of 'B' Station were upgraded to high pressure pulse jet bag filters, in 1976. The shaker-type fabric or bag filter has since become a standard feature of power stations in New South Wales.

== Heritage listing ==
The Wangi Power Station has highest level State heritage Significance for its association with leading the evolution of coalfields - sited power stations and power generation in New South Wales. It has similar level significance for being the largest power station in NSW for at least its first five years of operation. Its pre-eminent part in relieving NSW from the drastic power shortages and blackouts during the late 1950s and playing major roles in restoring power supply to NSW after the total state power shutdown of 10 June 1964. Wangi Power Station was the last of the Railway's power stations to be built, and the last one to close, and represents the transition from Railways to Elcom as the predominant power generation authority in NSW.

Wangi Power Station Complex was listed on the New South Wales State Heritage Register on 2 April 1999 having satisfied the following criteria.

The place is important in demonstrating the course, or pattern, of cultural or natural history in New South Wales.

The Wangi Power Station has highest level State heritage Significance for its association with leading the evolution of coalfields - sited power stations and power generation in New South wales. It has similar level significance for being the largest power station in NSW for at least first five years of operation. Its pre-eminent part in relieving NSW from the drastic power shortages and blackouts during the late 1950s and playing a major roles in restoring power supply to NSW after the total state power shutdown of 10 June 1964. Wangi Power Station was the last of the Railway's power stations to be built, and the last one to close, and represents the transition from Railways to Elcom as the predominant power generation authority in NSW.

The place is important in demonstrating aesthetic characteristics and/or a high degree of creative or technical achievement in New South Wales.

Wangi Power Station has highest level State significance being: aesthetically distinctive, showing creating and technical innovation, associated with the creative accomplishments of an eminent Architect and for continuing to act as a prime exemplar of a particular style of Architectural expression. Wangi Power Station is significant for its intended position as the "showpiece" of power generation in the state. Its position as a show piece was evidenced by the excellence of its architectural design, by the high quality of workmanship in the brick cladding, and in the outstanding appearance and quality of design and materials used.

The place has a strong or special association with a particular community or cultural group in New South Wales for social, cultural or spiritual reasons.

Wangi Power Station has regional social significance.

The place has potential to yield information that will contribute to an understanding of the cultural or natural history of New South Wales.

Wangi Power station has state level technical significance because it has unique potential to reveal worthwhile historical and scientific information unavailable elsewhere and it is a major reference in the state.

The place possesses uncommon, rare or endangered aspects of the cultural or natural history of New South Wales.

Wangi Power Station is significant as a rare example in Australia of industrial architecture. The building is significant for its rarity as a modern power station designed and built with its architectural appearance, as an integral part of its landscape and environment to the forefront of its design parametres, rather than using purely technological and economic factors to dictate the design.

Wangi Power Station is one of the last major buildings in Australia to have a structural frame of riveted steel. Further it is significant for its construction method, which incorporated an early use of the "fast tracking idea", whereby one end of the building was in full production before the other was fully erected.

== See also ==
- List of coal fired power stations in Australia
