= Blackalls Park =

- Suburb
- Coordinates: 33°00′04″S 151°35′13″E
- Country: Australia
- State: New South Wales
- City: Greater Newcastle
- LGA: City of Lake Macquarie
- Location: 2 km (1.2 mi) NW of Toronto
- Established: 1870

Government
  - State electorate: Lake Macquarie
  - Federal division: Hunter

Area
  - Total: 3.1 km^{2} (1.2 sq mi)

Population
  - Total: 2,812 (2021 census)
  - Density: 907/km^{2} (2,350/sq mi)
- Postcode: 2283
- Parish: Awaba
Suburbs around Blackalls Park
Awaba	Fassifern	Fennell Bay
Awaba	Blackalls Park	Toronto
	Toronto

Blackalls Park is a suburb of the City of Lake Macquarie, Greater Newcastle in New South Wales, Australia to the immediate north-west of the town of Toronto on a bay west of Lake Macquarie.

== History ==
Early industries were farming and broom-making.

Blackalls Park was named after the first family to live in the area, the Blackall family. Thomas Blackall and his father were pharmacists and dentists. Thomas was mayor. Ruby Blackall was a leading campaigner for the Adult Deaf and Dumb Society of New South Wales.

Blackalls Park was originally named Blackall Platform due to the, now unused, rail station in the area. The name was changed to Blackalls but then changed to Blackalls Park due to mail being sent to a town with a similar town, Blackall, Queensland.

In 1891, a tramway between Fassifern and Toronto opened. Due to the Blackall family being the only people boarding the platform, the area was to become known as Blackall Platform. This became the Toronto railway line, but was later replaced by a bus service in the 1990s.

The public primary school was opened in 1954 and services about 245 children (December 2012). It is a feeder school for Toronto High School, approximately 1.5 km to the south.

Blackalls Park is located on an inlet of Lake Macquarie. Small creeks also are found near the lake – Stoney Creek in the south-east separating Blackalls Park from Toronto, and LT Creek just 70 metres north-east of Fassifern Railway Station at the northern extremity of Blackalls Park's suburban limit.

In the mid-1980s, Blackalls Park acquired a small shopping village with a hardware store, a combined newsagency/post-office, a pharmacy, a mini-mart (small general store), a hot-bread shop, a hot food takeaway shop and a hairdresser. This was on the corner of Faucett Street and the main road connecting Toronto with Fassifern and Fennell Bay.

By 1989, a second smaller collection of shops opened at the corner of Centre Street and the main road. It had a large bottle shop (liquor store), a Chinese restaurant, a hairdressing salon and a small shop that sold toys and was later a Beany Babies (TM) outlet when that fad was at the peak of its popularity.
