= Kilaben Bay =

- Suburb
- Coordinates: 33°01′34″S 151°35′34″E
- Country: Australia
- State: New South Wales
- Region: Hunter
- City: City of Lake Macquarie
- LGA: City of Lake Macquarie
- Location: 131 km (81 mi) N of Sydney; 27 km (17 mi) SW of Newcastle; 10 km (6.2 mi) S of Speers Point

Government
  - State electorate: Lake Macquarie
  - Federal division: Hunter

Area
  - Total: 1.6 km^{2} (0.62 sq mi)
- Elevation (Note: Kilaben Bay is primarily flat however it does have some elevated areas. Average elevation of the suburb as shown on 1:100000 map 9232 NEWCASTLE.): 0 m (0 ft)

Population
  - Total: 1,516 (2021 census)
  - Density: 836.2/km^{2} (2,166/sq mi)
- Postcode: 2283
- County: Northumberland
- Parish: Awaba
Suburbs around Kilaben Bay
Toronto	Toronto	Toronto
Toronto	Kilaben Bay	Toronto, Carey Bay
Kilaben Bay	Kilaben Bay	Coal Point

Kilaben Bay is a suburb of the city of Lake Macquarie in the Hunter Region of New South Wales, Australia.

== History ==
The Aboriginal people, in this area, the Awabakal, were the first people of this land. It is named for the bay of the same name that lies to the south of the suburb. The suburb's western boundary is heavily forested. Kilaben Bay is one of many suburbs that ring Lake Macquarie, Lake Munmorah, and Tuggerah Lake. Kilaben Bay is part of the West Ward of the City of Lake Macquarie local government area. For telephone call charges, Kilaben Bay is within the local call zone of the City of Newcastle.
