= Black Rock Motor Resort =

Race track under construction in New South Wales, Australia

- Location: 282 Rhondda Road, Wakefield, New South Wales, Australia
- Coordinates: 32°57′42.16″S 151°34′33.71″E
- Opened: Under construction
- Length: 5.409 km (3.361 mi)
- Turns: 23

Black Rock Motor Resort is a permanent race track and resort under construction 20 km south-west of Newcastle, New South Wales, Australia. The circuit will be the second private motorsport venue in New South Wales after The Farm on the Central Coast.

== History ==
Situated in bushland on the site of a former colliery in western Lake Macquarie, construction of the venue – the second in the region after Circuit Italia in Port Stephens – began in March 2024. Designed by Tilke to FIA Grade 2 standards, the venue is intended to be a club-only circuit similar to Circuito Ascari and Bilster Berg with leaseable villas, holiday accommodation and recreational and dining facilities. In December 2024, Managing Director Tony Palmer claimed in a press conference with circuit ambassador Toby Price that circuit preparations were complete and that the first stage of construction would be finished in June 2026.
