= Fassifern, New South Wales =

Suburb in New South Wales, Australia

Fassifern
- Suburb
- Coordinates: 32°59′13″S 151°35′06″E
- Country: Australia
- State: New South Wales
- City: Greater Newcastle
- LGA: City of Lake Macquarie
- Location: 4 km (2.5 mi) NNW of Toronto

Government
  - State electorate: Lake Macquarie
  - Federal division: Hunter

Area
  - Total: 0.8 km^{2} (0.31 sq mi)

Population
  - Total: 586 (2021 census)
  - Density: 730/km^{2} (1,900/sq mi)
- Postcode: 2283
- Parish: Awaba
Suburbs around Fassifern
Wakefield	Teralba	Teralba
Teralba	Fassifern	Fennell Bay
Awaba	Blackalls Park	Blackalls Park

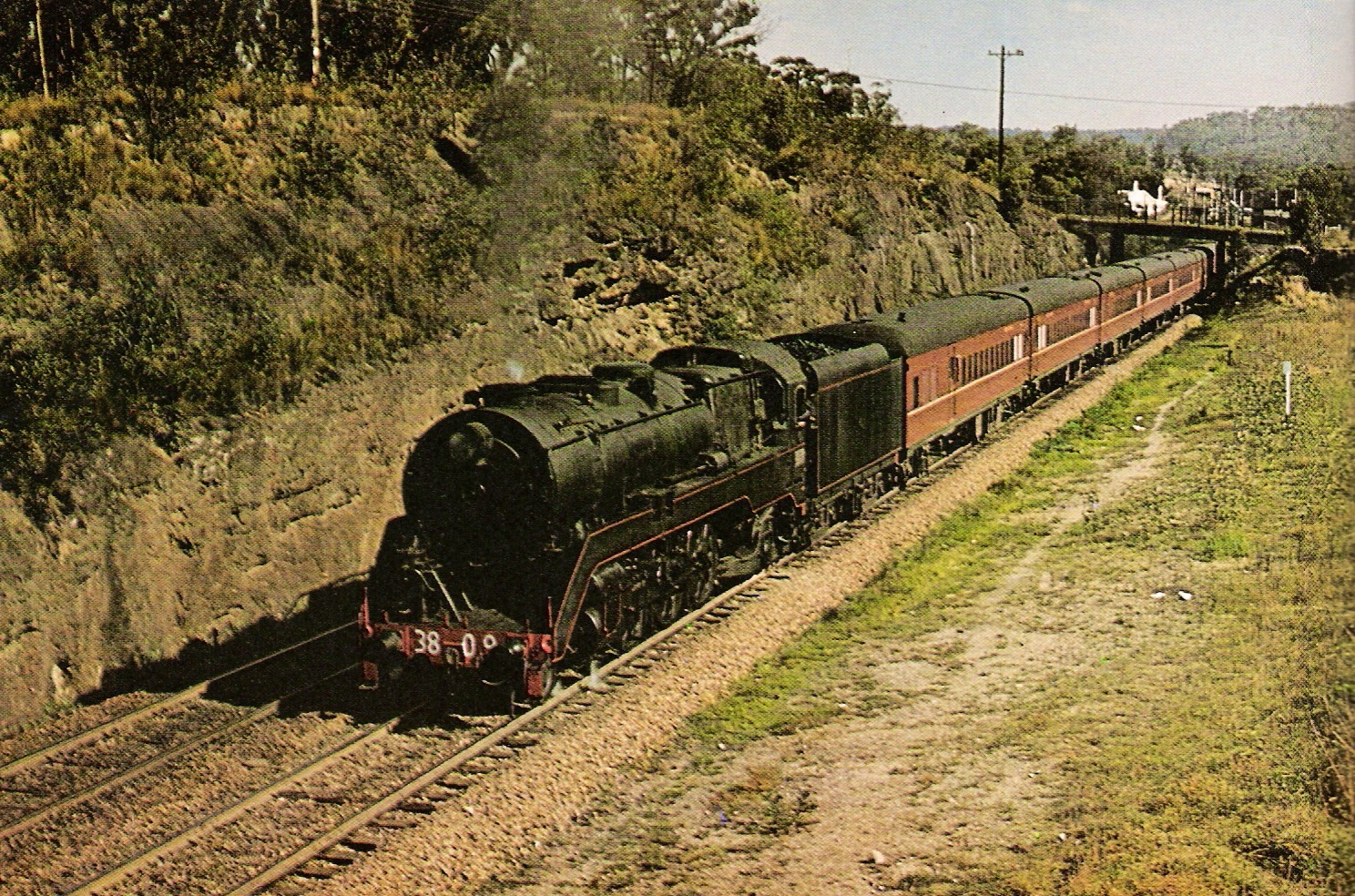
The air-conditioned Sydney-Newcastle Express train, The Flyer, leaves Fassifern in 1967.

Fassifern is a suburb of the City of Lake Macquarie, Greater Newcastle in New South Wales, Australia, located west of Lake Macquarie. The Sydney–Newcastle railway line runs through Fassifern railway station, which is a major station along the line. There used to be a branch line between Fassifern Station and nearby Toronto.

== History ==
The Aboriginal people, in this area, the Awabakal, were the first people of this land.

Fassifern was first developed as a result of sawmill and coal mining operations in the area. The railway station opened in 1887. The first school, Fassifern Public School, was opened in 1922.

From the late 19th century the Northumberland Coal Company operated the Northumberland Colliery, within walking distance from the railway station and to where a rail spur extended. This company operated several subsidiary coal companies. Further up the main line they had another colliery, Olstan, now long closed. In 1950 Northumberland Colliery was renamed Newstan Colliery and leased out to the NSW Electricity Commission, and operated until 2014. The mine is being investigated for a pumped-storage hydroelectricity project. The collieries were named after Mr Stanley Croft, an early proprietor and manager of the coal company. The mine was a source for some of the local jobs in Fassifern and the surrounding suburbs.

Recently Charlton Christian College (the name was changed from Lake Macquarie Christian College, reportedly to avoid confusion from Macquarie College) was established.

== Location ==
Fassifern is located on the western side of Lake Macquarie in Fennell Bay, a small bay with mangrove and she-oak trees on its shores. Some petrified wood exists in a part of the bay, which is said to be the remains of a petrified forest (many pieces of the wood have been taken). Fassifern also contains vast amounts of native bushland to the north and west.

== Education ==
- Fassifern Public School (public, K–6)
- Charlton Christian College (private Christian, K–12)
