= Woodrising, New South Wales =

Woodrising
- Suburb
- Coordinates: 32°59′13″S 151°36′25″E
- Country: Australia
- State: New South Wales
- City: Greater Newcastle
- LGA: City of Lake Macquarie
- Location: 23 km (14 mi) WSW of Newcastle; 4 km (2.5 mi) NNE of Toronto

Government
  - State electorate: Lake Macquarie
  - Federal division: Hunter

Area
  - Total: 0.9 km^{2} (0.35 sq mi)

Population
  - Total: 1,176 (2021 census)
  - Density: 1,310/km^{2} (3,380/sq mi)
- Postcode: 2284
- Parish: Awaba
Suburbs around Woodrising
Booragul	Marmong Point	Marmong Point
Fennell Bay	Woodrising	Lake Macquarie
Fennell Bay	Bolton Point	Bolton Point

Woodrising is a suburb of the City of Lake Macquarie, Greater Newcastle in New South Wales, Australia, and is located northeast of the town of Toronto on the western shore Lake Macquarie.

== History ==
The Awabakal were the traditional people of this area.
