= Booragul railway station =

Railway station in New South Wales, Australia

Booragul
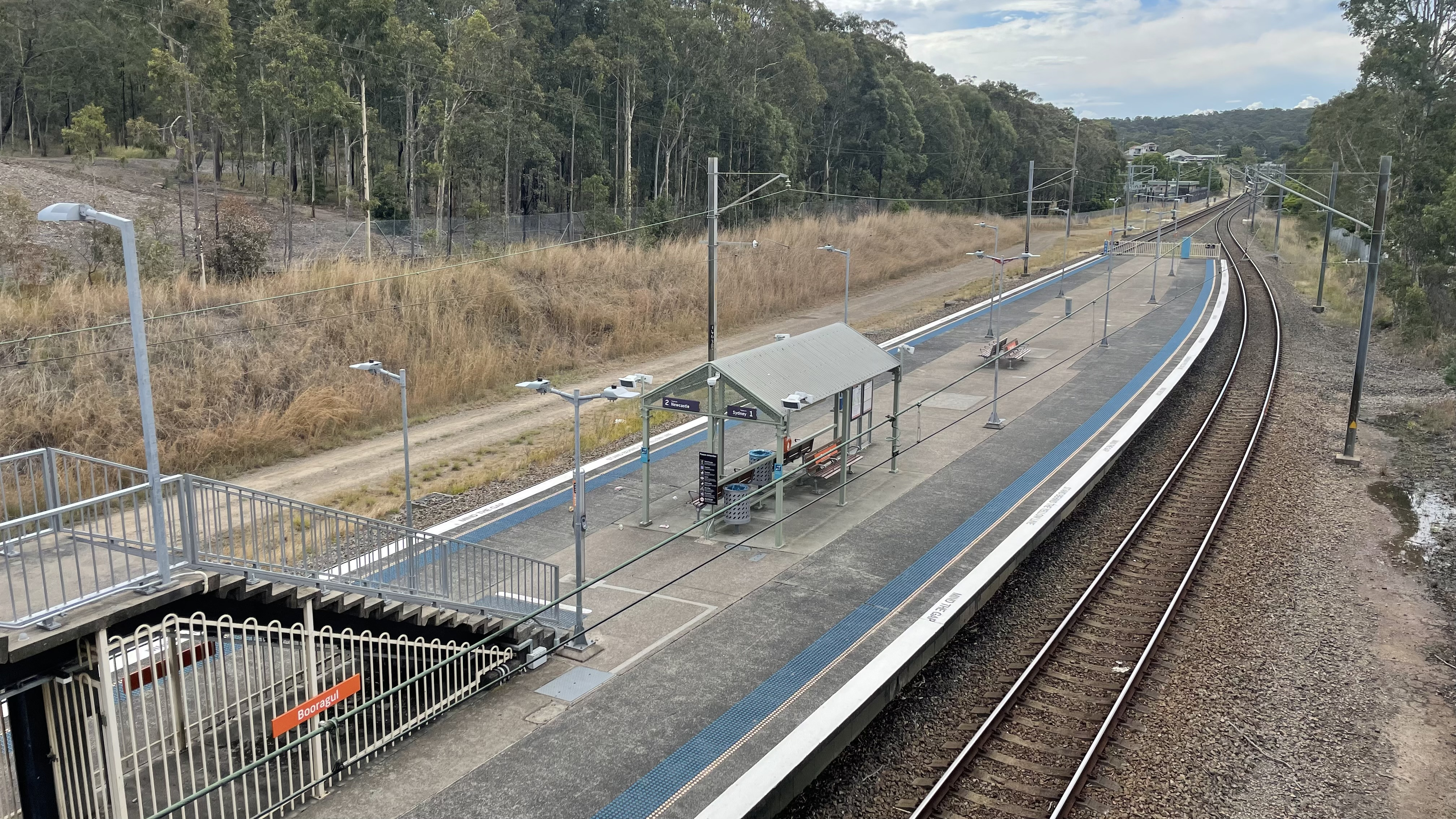
- Northbound view of the station platforms, November 2023

General information
- Location: Station Street, Booragul; Australia
- Coordinates: 32°58′17″S 151°36′17″E
- Owner: Transport Asset Manager of New South Wales
- Operator: Sydney Trains
- Line: Main Northern
- Distance: 146.39 km (90.96 mi) from Central
- Platforms: 2 (1 island)
- Tracks: 2
- Connections: Bus

Construction
- Structure type: Ground
- Accessible: No

Other information
- Station code: BGL
- Website: Transport for NSW

History
- Opened: 24 October 1926; 99 years ago

Passengers
- 2025: 17,330 (year); 47 (daily) (Sydney Trains, NSW TrainLink)

Services
Preceding station	Intercity Trains	Following station
Teralba towards Newcastle Interchange	Central Coast & Newcastle Line	Fassifern towards Central
Location

Booragul railway station is located on the Main Northern line in New South Wales, Australia. It serves the City of Lake Macquarie suburb of Booragul opening on 24 October 1926.

The original station buildings were extensively damaged in the 1989 Newcastle earthquake, resulting in their demolition and replacement with the current structures.

A housing development west of the station is currently under construction, however, there is no convenient access to the railway station, and will likely do little to increase patronage (which averaged at 110 passengers per day in 2013).

== Platforms and services ==
Booragul has one island platform with two faces. It is serviced by Sydney Trains Intercity Central Coast & Newcastle Line services travelling between Sydney Central, Gosford and Newcastle.

Platform	Line	Stopping pattern	Notes
1	CCN	Services to Gosford & Sydney Central	
2	CCN	Services to Newcastle	

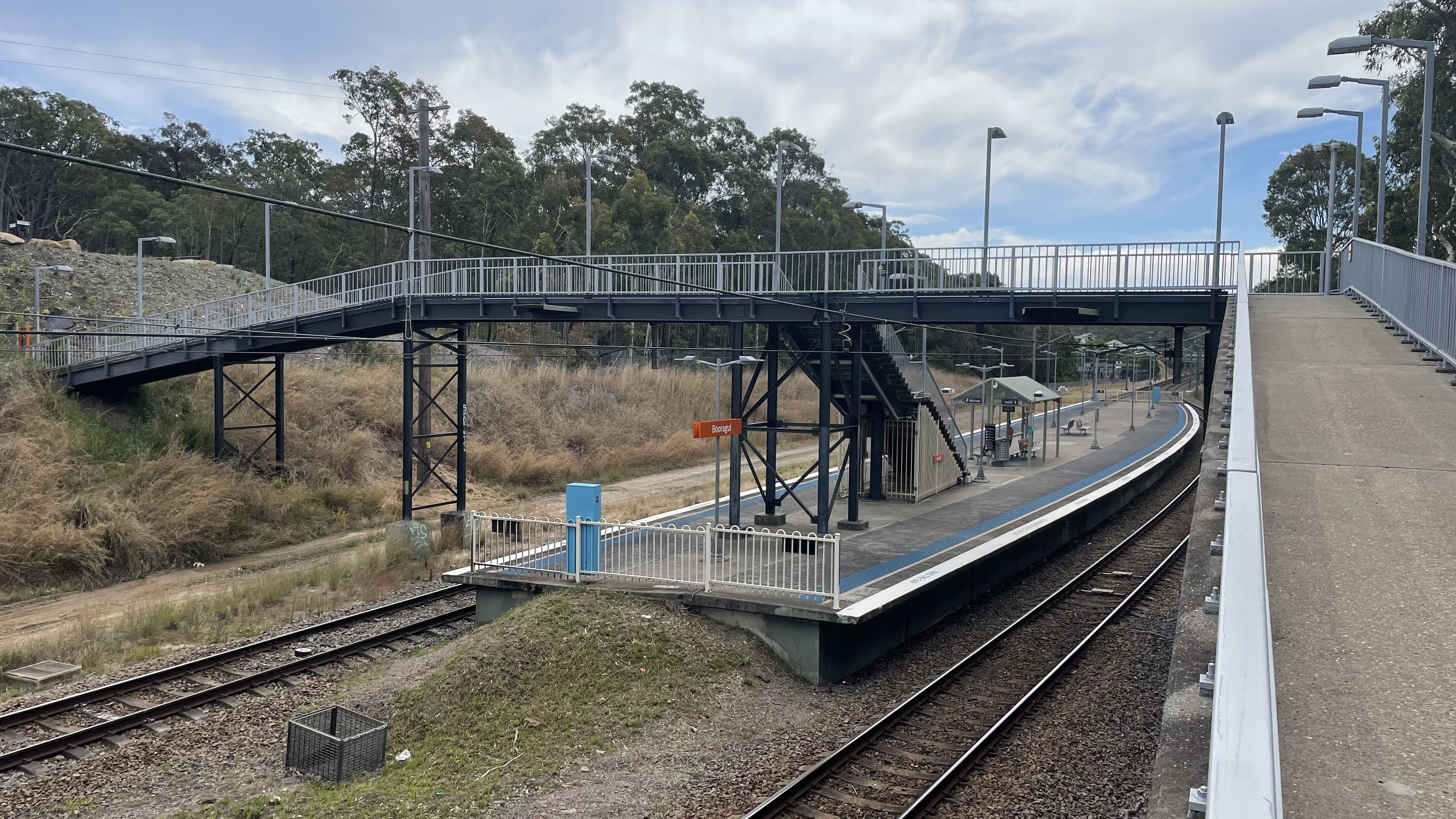
Footbridge and platforms

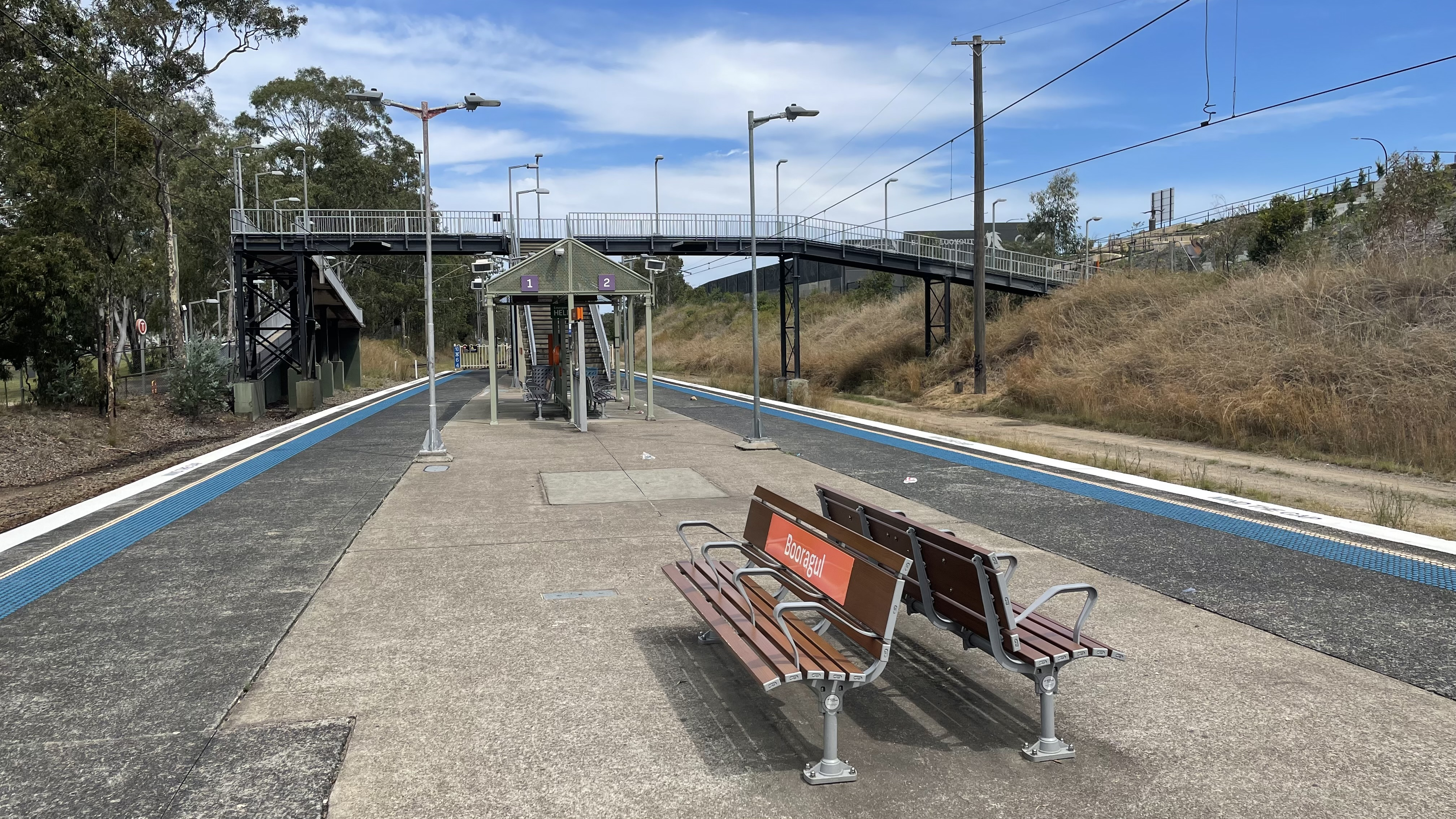
Platform 1 southbound view

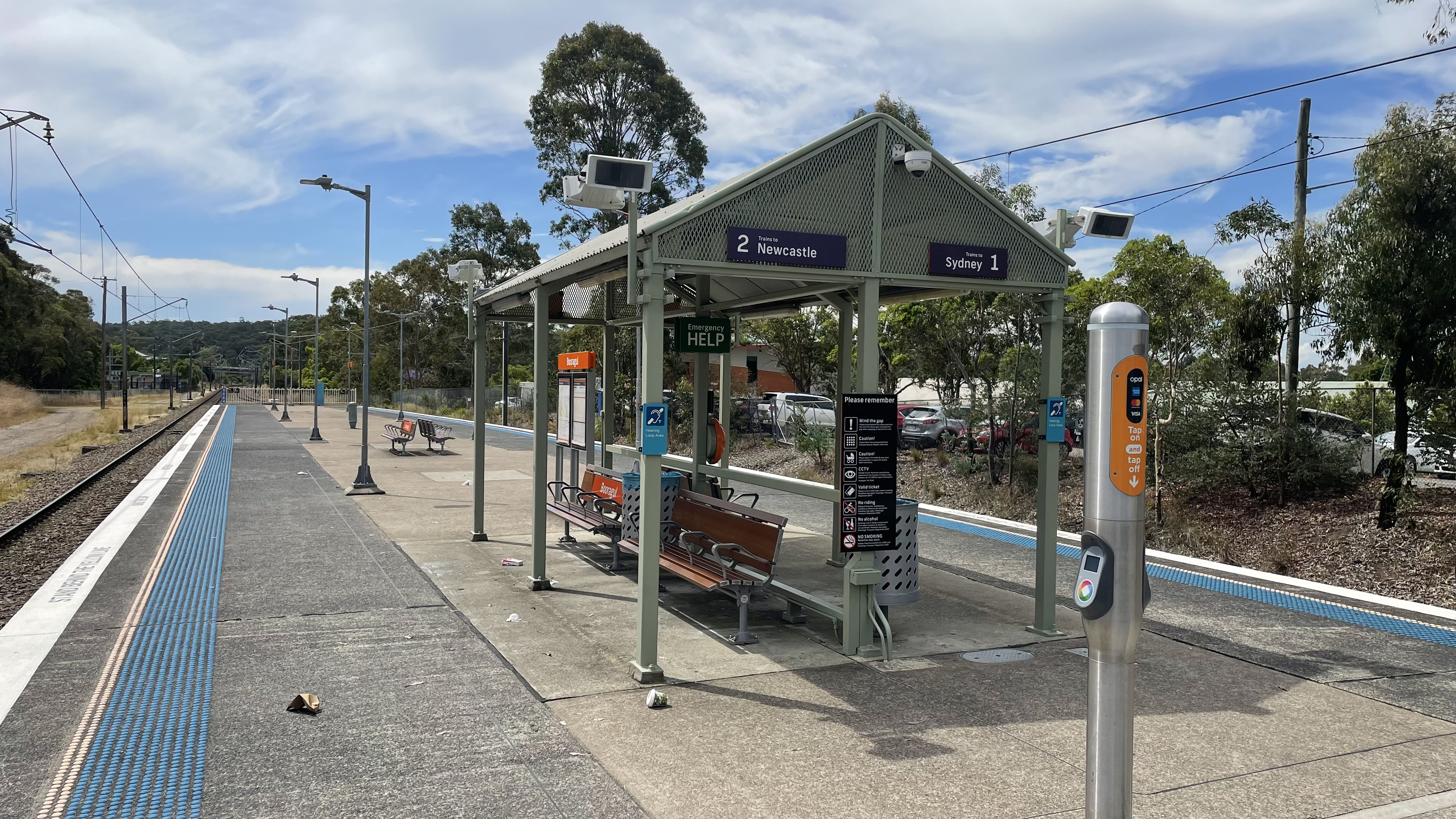
Platform 2 northbound view

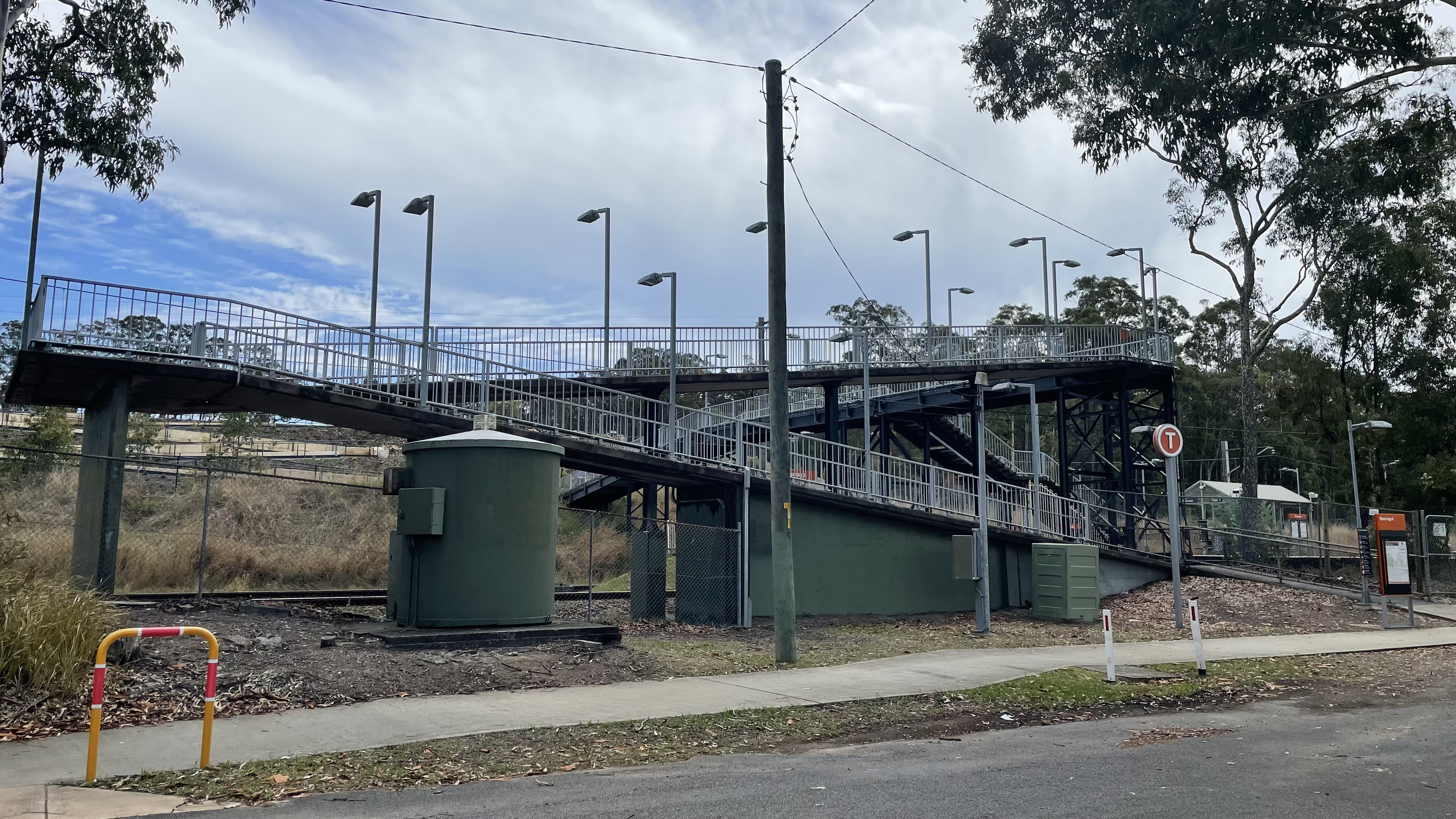
Entrance from Station Street

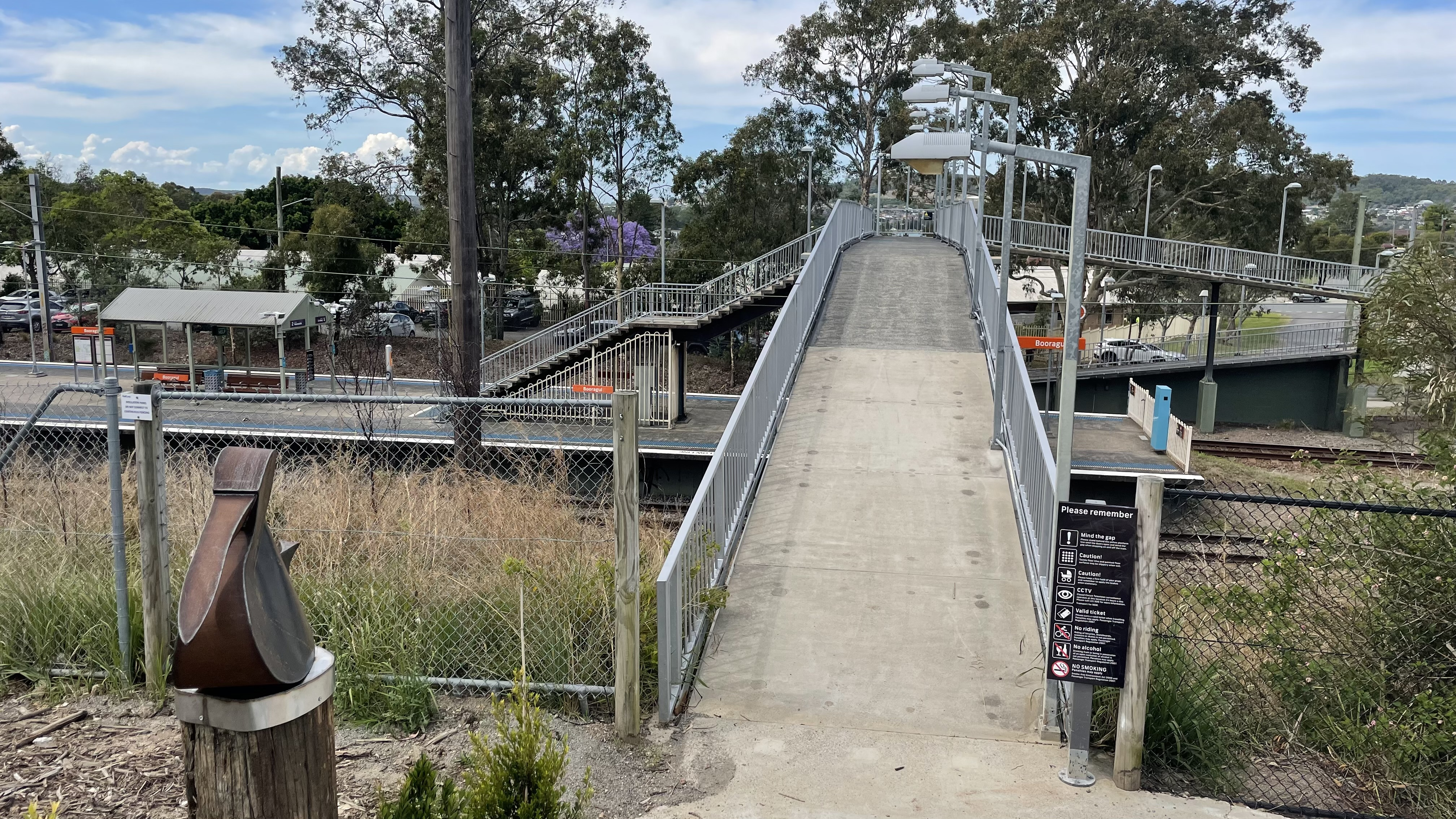
Entrance from Billy's Lookout Housing development
