= Ebenezer Colliery =

Mine in New South Wales, Australia

- Location in Australia
- Location: Coal Point, New South Wales, Australia; 33°02′50.86″S 151°36′50.19″E
- Products: Coal

Ebenezer Colliery was a coal mine located at Coal Point, New South Wales, Australia.

Reverend Lancelot Edward Threlkeld began mining at the south west point of Coal Point near Toronto in 1840, after the failure of his aboriginal mission.

The mine was worked by hand and the skips run on wooden rails. The coal was loaded into vessels from a large wooden jetty. Due to the shallow channel at Swansea the coal was taken to a coal loading and storage depot at the head of Lake Macquarie, known as Reid's Mistake, where it was loaded upon oceangoing vessels.

Threlkeld's mine pre-dated the Australian Agricultural Company (AA Co) monopoly on coal mining, however Threlkeld found it difficult to attract miners, to compete against the AA Co monopoly and the Governor of New South Wales George Gipps refused to supply convicts. Threlkeld's estate was sold at auction to the mortgagee in 1844 to repay outstanding debts.

The mine was worked further under lease by Henry R. Whittell and later by Ralph M. Robey, although it was often not worked. It was worked as South Hetton Colliery as late as 1906. The South Hetton Colliery was advertising coal for sale with delivery at Sydney, Newcastle "or at our own wharves at Lake Macquarie" as late as the end of April 1910.
