= Bolton Point, New South Wales =

Bolton Point
- Suburb
- Coordinates: 33°00′11″S 151°36′54″E
- Country: Australia
- State: New South Wales
- LGA: City of Lake Macquarie
- Location: 24 km (15 mi) WSW of Newcastle; 4 km (2.5 mi) ENE of Toronto

Government
  - State electorate: Lake Macquarie
  - Federal division: Hunter

Area
  - Total: 1.7 km^{2} (0.66 sq mi)

Population
  - Total: 2,124 (2021 census)
  - Density: 1,250/km^{2} (3,240/sq mi)
- Postcode: 2283
- Parish: Awaba
Suburbs around Bolton Point
Fennell Bay	Woodrising	Woodrising
Lake Macquarie	Bolton Point	Lake Macquarie
	Lake Macquarie

Bolton Point is a suburb of the City of Lake Macquarie in New South Wales, Australia, and is located northeast of Toronto on a peninsula extending southwards into western Lake Macquarie.
