= Ruby Blackall =

(1880–1951) charity organizer

- Born: Ruby Constance Ethel Thomas; 7 May 1880; Gympie
- Died: 23 August 1951 (aged 71); Sydney
- Occupation: Nurse
- Employer: Royal Newcastle Hospital
- Spouse: Thomas Blackall
- Children: Lynette Blackall

Ruby Constance Ethel Blackall born Ruby Constance Ethel Thomas (May 7, 1880 – August 23, 1951) was an Australian charity organizer. As the Newcastle mayoress she started fund-raising that resulted in Blackall House as a local base for the Adult Deaf and Dumb Society of New South Wales and in the creation of a holiday home.

== Life ==
Blackall was born in 1880 in Gympie, Queensland. Her parents, who were immigrants from England, were Emmeline Sarah Jane (born) Brett and her husband Edwin Thomas, who was a banker. In time, her parents had two more children to add to Ruby and her elder three siblings.

She moved from Queensland to New South Wales in 1903 and trained as a nurse at the Royal Newcastle Hospital. She qualified in June 1905. She married at St Andrew's Anglican Church in Newcastle's suburb of Waratah. Her husband was a dentist named Thomas Blackall. He came from a locally well known family who lived in the Newcastle area. His father was a pharmacist in Newcastle and the area known as Blackalls Park was named for his family. The two of them had a daughter who they named Lynette in 1916 and she was found to be deaf.

Her husband became a local politician and in 1929 he became the 1930 mayor of Newcastle. During his term of office, she called a public meeting in February 1930 to form a local group to be associated with the Adult Deaf and Dumb Society of New South Wales. The meeting achieved its aim and Mrs Blackall became the branch secretary and her husband was the group's patron. A month later the group had its own rooms and Ruby Blackall began her dedicated fund raising. The law at the time allowed only one organisation to raise money for the deaf which ended a power struggle in place between the people who raised money for the deaf and people who were deaf.

In 1935 Frederick Stewart opened a new building which was to be the society's home in the area. The building was called Blackall House to recognise Ruby Blackall's contribution. One source records the date as 1936, but either way this was the home of the Newcastle branch of the Adult Deaf and Dumb Society of New South Wales where events took place. In 1948 Helen Keller visited Blackall House where she spoke about the importance of early training for the deaf explaining how Ann Sullivan had made the breakthrough of teaching her that words existed for everything.

Fundraising continued for many years to build a holiday home for the deaf. Blackall saw the foundations being made, but she died before the home was completed. She died in Sydney in 1951. Blackall House closed in 1990. The Adult Deaf and Dumb Society of New South Wales became the Deaf Society of New South Wales.
