= Wakefield, New South Wales =

Wakefield New South Wales
- Coordinates: 32°56′56″S 151°33′04″E
- Population: 144 (2021 census)
- Postcode(s): 2278
- Elevation: 49 m (161 ft)
- Location: 25 km (16 mi) NNE of Morisset; 27 km (17 mi) W of Newcastle; 134 km (83 mi) N of Sydney; 61 km (38 mi) N of The Entrance; 46 km (29 mi) N of Wyong
- LGA(s): City of Lake Macquarie
- Parish: Teralba
- State electorate(s): Lake Macquarie
- Federal division(s): Hunter
Suburbs around Wakefield:
Killingworth	Killingworth	Teralba
Awaba	Wakefield	Teralba
Awaba	Awaba	Fassifern

Wakefield is a small-rural locality in the City of Lake Macquarie in New South Wales, Australia, situated 25 kilometres to the west of Newcastle. At the 2016 census, it had a population of 144.

== History ==
The Awabakal people are the first people of this area.

The suburb was the site of Rhondda Colliery from the late-19th century until 1971. The site was repurposed in the mid-2020s and turned into Black Rock Motor Resort.
