= Storm Approaching Wangi =

1948 painting by William Dobell

- Artist: William Dobell
- Year: 1948
- Medium: oil on cardboard on composition board
- Dimensions: 32.5 cm × 55.5 cm (12.8 in × 21.9 in)
- Location: Private collection

Storm Approaching Wangi is a 1948 painting by Australian artist Sir William Dobell. The painting depicts a storm at Wangi Wangi, New South Wales.

Dobell's successful Wynne landscape entry is more conventional, although still typical Dobell in feeling. Two men and a woman are in the foreground at the edge of a lake drawing a boat to the shore. The menace of an approaching storm is typified by a stark black tree nearby, a threatening sky and a deserted background.

— Newcastle Morning Herald,

The Art Gallery of New South Wales awarded the work the Wynne Prize for landscape painting in 1948. Dobell was awarded the Archibald Prize that same year for his portrait of artist Margaret Olley. Dobell painted the work after retiring to Wangi Wangi following the controversy over his portrait Mr Joshua Smith which was the subject of a court challenge after it was awarded the Archibald Prize in 1943.

Gallery director Mark Widdup described the painting as "one of the most important landscape works of the 20th century."

It is a landscape painting of historical importance becoming more significant as it was a painting that cemented the artist's credibility once more after his reputation in the art world was challenged

— Mark Widdup,

Dobell sold the work to Frank and Thelma Clune in 1948. It was then sold to a corporate collection in 1991. The work was most recently sold in 2016 for AUD408,700 to a private collector.
