= Wangi Wangi, New South Wales =

Wangi Wangi
- Suburb
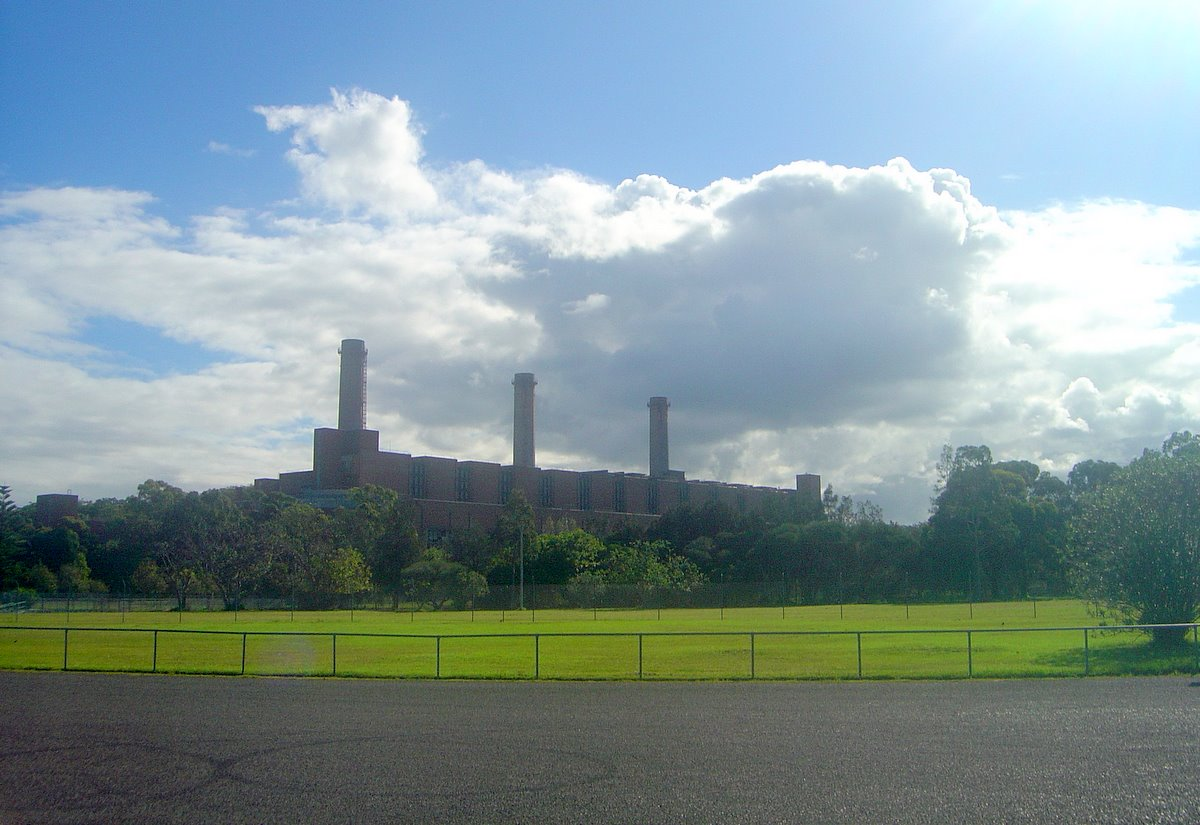
- Wangi Power Station

- Coordinates: 33°3′54″S 151°34′5″E
- Country: Australia
- State: New South Wales
- City: Greater Newcastle
- LGA: City of Lake Macquarie
- Location: 16 km (9.9 mi) ENE of Morisset; 35 km (22 mi) SW of Newcastle; 133 km (83 mi) N of Sydney; 39 km (24 mi) N of Wyong; 48 km (30 mi) N of The Entrance

Government
  - State electorate: Lake Macquarie
  - Federal division: Hunter
- Elevation: 9 m (30 ft)

Population
  - Total: 2,920 (2021 census)
- Postcode: 2267
- Parish: Awaba
Suburbs around Wangi Wangi
Arcadia Vale	Lake Macquarie
Arcadia Vale	Wangi Wangi	Lake Macquarie
	Lake Macquarie

Wangi Wangi (/ˈwɒndʒi wɒndʒi/) is a suburb of the City of Lake Macquarie in New South Wales, Australia, which forms a peninsula jutting eastwards into Lake Macquarie. Wangi Wangi is a well known holiday spot, that was frequented in the early days by families from the coalfields. It is known for its views, bush-walking, and fishing spots.

== History ==
The Awabakal people are the first people of this area.

Early travel to the peninsula was quite difficult, and it was only accessible by ferries. Among the ferries operating to allow travel to Wangi were the Wangi Wangi, the Azile and the first Wangi Queen .

The Wangi Queen currently on Sydney Harbour started out as a double decker built in 1922 as the Ettalong for use at Ettalong, and subsequently renamed Profound, and renamed in 1975 as the second "Wangi Queen" for use Lake Macquarie, where it remained until 2012.

Wangi is also well known as the former home of artist William Dobell. Dobell's 1948 Wynne Prize winning landscape Storm Approaching Wangi depicts the locality.

The suburb is also home to the retired Wangi Power Station, which operated from 1956 to 1986. Pulbah Island lies to the south of the peninsula.

Wangi Wangi also has its own Rugby league team over the years being the Wangi Warriors. There are also a number of bushwalking tracks around the bushland. Some of which are host to gun emplacements, stationed during the course of World War II. Wangi Wangi and its people : a local history was published in 1987. The name Wangi Wangi is aboriginal for either Water Water, many night owls or many trees.

== Heritage listings ==
Wangi Wangi has a number of heritage-listed sites, including:

- Wangi Power Station
- 47 Dobell Drive: Dobell House

== See also ==
- List of reduplicated Australian place names
