= Eraring =

Suburb of New South Wales, Australia

- Suburb
- Coordinates: 33°03′54″S 151°31′05″E
- Country: Australia
- State: New South Wales
- LGA: City of Lake Macquarie
- Location: 7 km (4.3 mi) NE of Morisset
- Established: 1840

Government
  - State electorate: Lake Macquarie
  - Federal division: Hunter

Population
  - Total: 221 (2021 census)
- Postcode: 2264
- Parish: Coorumbung

Eraring is a suburb of the City of Lake Macquarie, New South Wales, Australia, and is located on the western shore of Lake Macquarie and north of the town of Morisset.

== History ==
The area's name is Aboriginal in origin and means "that which gleams or glitters". Eraring was renamed Newport in the hope that a port facility would be built there, but this never happened. Some farming was established. Dr. Leighton Jones, who was known as the Monkey Doctor because he conducted rejuvenation operations using monkey glands, moved into the area in the 1930s. A public school opened in 1924, however, it was shut down at the start of 2015 due to a lack of students.

Construction began on Eraring Power Station in 1975. It was completed in 1984. Most of the workers live in the surrounding area rather than in Eraring itself.
