= Coal Point =

- Suburb
- Coordinates: 33°02′13″S 151°36′36″E
- Country: Australia
- State: New South Wales
- LGA: City of Lake Macquarie
- Location: 4 km (2.5 mi) SE of Toronto

Government
  - State electorate: Lake Macquarie
  - Federal division: Hunter

Area
  - Total: 1.3 km^{2} (0.50 sq mi)

Population
  - Total: 1,749 (2021 census)
  - Density: 1,350/km^{2} (3,480/sq mi)
- Postcode: 2283
- Parish: Awaba
Suburbs around Coal Point
	Carey Bay
Lake Macquarie	Coal Point	Lake Macquarie
	Lake Macquarie

Coal Point is a suburb of the City of Lake Macquarie in New South Wales, Australia on a peninsula south-east of the towns of Toronto and Carey Bay, on the western side of Lake Macquarie.

== History ==
Coal mining was performed at Ebenezer Colliery Coal Point from 1841 to around 1906. The first coal mine was operated by Reverend Lancelot Threlkeld, a missionary to the Awabakal people, local entrepreneur and the first European landholder of 'Punte', the Coal Point to Toronto area. The explorer Ludwig Leichhardt visited the mine in 1842.

A public school opened in 1955.

The area has a reputation for being a high socioeconomic demographic, which relates to the initial historical subdivision of the Toronto Estate by the Excelsior Land Investment and Building Company in 1887. The creation of this estate required the resumption of the 100 ft waterfront reserve that encircled Lake Macquarie. Five reserves were created on Coal Point to compensate for the loss of public land. The Toronto Estate was marketed to the well-to-do of the time.

In 1946 the Coal Point Progress Association was established to work for the betterment of the community. The founding members raised money to purchase a block of land and build Progress Hall, one of the last remaining community-owned halls in Lake Macquarie.
