= Toronto, New South Wales =

Toronto
- Suburb
- Coordinates: 33°0′58.3″S 151°34′57.3″E
- Country: Australia
- State: New South Wales
- Region: Hunter
- City: Greater Newcastle
- LGA: City of Lake Macquarie
- Location: 28 km (17 mi) SW of Newcastle; 137 km (85 mi) N of Sydney; 17 km (11 mi) SW of Charlestown; 45 km (28 mi) SSE of Maitland; 54 km (34 mi) N of The Entrance
- Established: 1829

Government
  - State electorate: Lake Macquarie
  - Federal division: Hunter

Area^{Note1}
  - Total: 9.5 km^{2} (3.7 sq mi)
- Elevation: 19 m (62 ft)

Population
  - Total: 5,973 (2021 census)
  - Density: 629/km^{2} (1,628/sq mi)
- Postcode: 2283
- County: Northumberland
- Parish: Awaba
Suburbs around Toronto
| Awaba | Blackalls Park | Lake Macquarie |
| Awaba | Toronto | Lake Macquarie |
| Awaba | Rathmines, Kilaben Bay | Carey Bay, Kilaben Bay |

Toronto (/təˈrɒntoʊ/ tə-RONT-oh) is a lakeside suburb within the City of Lake Macquarie, Greater Newcastle in New South Wales, Australia, approximately 28 kilometres (17 mi) from Newcastle's central business district and is a commercial hub for the sprawling suburbs on the western shore of the lake. It is one of the major centres in the City of Lake Macquarie.

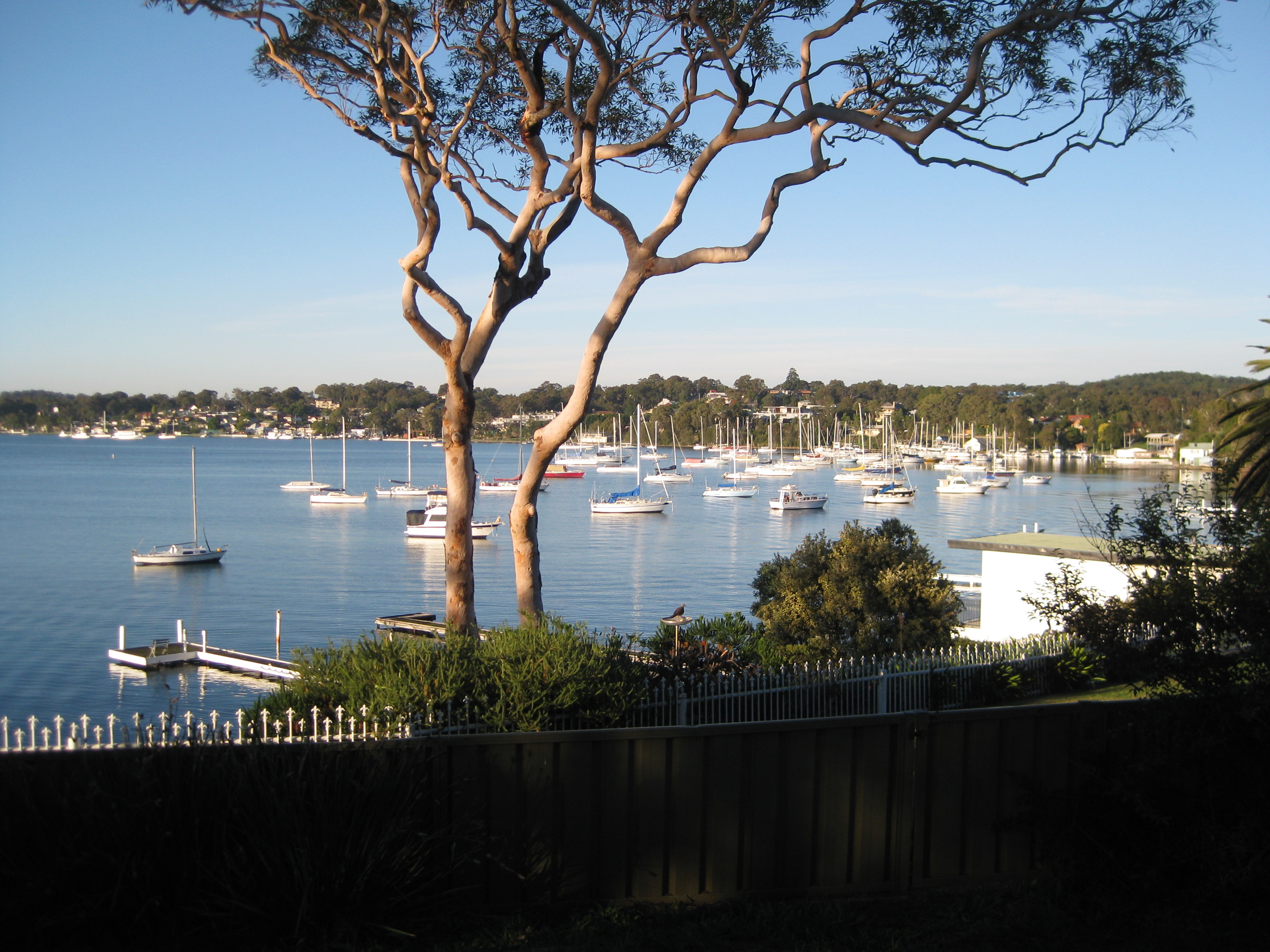
The lake at Toronto

== History ==
The Aboriginal people, in this area, the Awabakal, were the first people of this land.

The area was originally the site of an Aboriginal mission called Ebenezer, established in 1829 by Reverend Threlkeld. Threlkeld is reported to have begun construction of his chimney with a local black stone which he later realised was coal. Coal Point, just to the south, is named after this discovery. The development of several coal mines in the region, proximity to the nearby city of Newcastle, and its position by the lake led to gradual development and population increases. The mission closed in 1841.

In 1885, the Excelsior Land, Investment and Building Co. and Bank Ltd acquired a portion of Threlkelds' original 1,280 acre grant from McMahon and Whiting plus the 100 ft waterfront reserve from the Crown for £13,722 and subdivided it in 1887.

Ebenezer was then renamed after Toronto, Ontario, Canada, in honour of Edward Hanlan, a Canadian world-champion sculler who visited Australia in 1884. The area's subdividers, the Excelsior Company, named the land in honour of Hanlan's visit, which coincided with the opening of the subdivision. The Canadian city's name is said to have come from the Mohawk language tkaronto, meaning “where there are trees standing in the water".

This subdivision also coincided with the opening of the Great Northern Railway and became the basis of the future town of Toronto. The Prince of Wales, later Edward VIII, visited Toronto by train on the Toronto railway line on 24 June 1920.

== Population ==
At the 2021 census, there were 5,973 people in Toronto.

- Aboriginal and Torres Strait Islander people made up 8.3% of the population.
- 82.4% of people were born in Australia. The next most common country of birth was England at 3.5%.
- 89.3% of people spoke only English at home.
- The most common responses for religion were No Religion 41.7%, Anglican 16.6% and Catholic 15.3%.

== Services ==
Toronto has three public schools: Toronto High School, Toronto Primary School, and Biraban Public School. It also has three private schools, Charlton Christian College, St. Joseph's Primary School and Toronto Adventist Primary School.

Toronto has a polyclinic and a private hospital. There is also a multidisciplinary healthcare centre called the Alec Rice Centre on The Boulevarde.

Toronto has an ambulance station, police station, Fire Brigade and a Court House that serve the Western Lake Macquarie area.

== Notable areas ==
=== The Boulevarde ===
Toronto has a high street called The Boulevarde. This road starts at the foreshore, forming a junction with Victory Parade. This road stretches westwards for 1.2 kilometres, and is the commercial hub for Toronto and its surrounding areas.

The section of the road between the foreshore and Cary Street is the main retail area for Toronto. There are many boutique shops on this strip.

Over the years, the streetscape has degraded and in 2013, Lake Macquarie City Council decided to start renewing the streetscape. This process began by cutting down the famous figs that line the street, and then replacing the walkways and planting more controllable trees. Work will continue into 2018.

=== Victory Parade ===
The War Memorial – Unveiled by Lt. Col. BURNAGE, 30 September 1922

Soon after its unveiling in Victory Parade, the Monument was found to be a traffic hazard, so it was moved closer to the footpath (at the entrance to the pedestrian bridge over the railway line). In 1959 it was moved to Edward Gain Park, near Wharf Street. Then in the 1964, when there was a proposal to take some of this park for a road, the Monument was moved to Goffet Park. However, no matter where it has been located, the Monument has always been the focal point for the Anzac Day and Remembrance Day services in Toronto.

Victory Theatre

NMH 2.2.1921:7 – Toronto is to have a Picture Theatre 90 feet (27 m) by 40 feet (12 m) wide – Mr J Chapman has contract. Located in Victory Parade, Toronto opposite the Railway Station. Commenced screening on Wednesday 19 July 1922 by Mr George W Goffett. After having several owners, it was bought by Mr & Mrs P Crethary around 1951. CinemaScope was installed about the mid-1950s, it was the first theatre outside Newcastle to have it. The theatre closed on Saturday 12 August 1961. The last films screened were "The Angry Silence" and "The Gunslinger". The building was used by a variety of businesses including Inskip Motorcycles until 1984. The building no longer exists, as it was destroyed by fire in the early 1990s.

Hotel Toronto

Built in 1887 from locally made bricks, the Toronto Hotel has been the best-known landmark throughout the entire history of the township.

The Excelsior Company enthusiastically promoted it as "a pleasant and commodious brick building, containing about thirty bedrooms, besides parlors, bar, dining and billiard rooms, &c. Standing on one of the prettiest spots upon the shores of the Lake, in its own grounds of some twenty acres, the hotel commands a fine view of a splendid reach of water extending to the little village of Belmont. The extensive pleasure grounds are laid out with croquet lawns, lawn tennis court, bowling greens, &c. A spacious dancing pavilion has been erected for devotees of Terpsichore, while the lovers of the green cloth are provided with an excellent billiard table."

Now on the Register of the National Estate, the hotel has undergone numerous alterations and renovations throughout its lifetime. It no longer dominates the skyline as it did in years gone by. Healthy and vigorous trees growing in Regatta Walk render the Hotel barely visible from Toronto's public baths and private jetties.

== Religion ==
There are multiple churches in Toronto. These are:

- The Foursquare Church of Australia 'New Day Christian Church' on Day Street
- Christ the King Anglican Church on Brighton Avenue
- The Church of Jesus Christ of Latter Day Saints on Bandalong Street
- Jehovah's Witnesses Church on Excelsior Parade
- Goodlife Church Toronto held at Charlton Christian College
- Pentecostal 'Living Word Lakeside' Church held at Toronto Primary School on Bay Street
- St. Joseph's Catholic Church on Wangi Road
- Toronto Seventh-Day Adventist Church on Parkside Parade
- Toronto Uniting Church on The Boulevarde
- Toronto Baptist Church on the corner of The Boulevarde and Jindalee Street
- Westlakes Independent Baptist Church on Ridge Road, Kilaben Bay.

== Transport ==
Toronto is considered to be the hub for public transport on the western side of Lake Macquarie. The area is served by a privately operated bus service; 'Hunter Valley Buses', which services the areas to the west, south and north of the town.

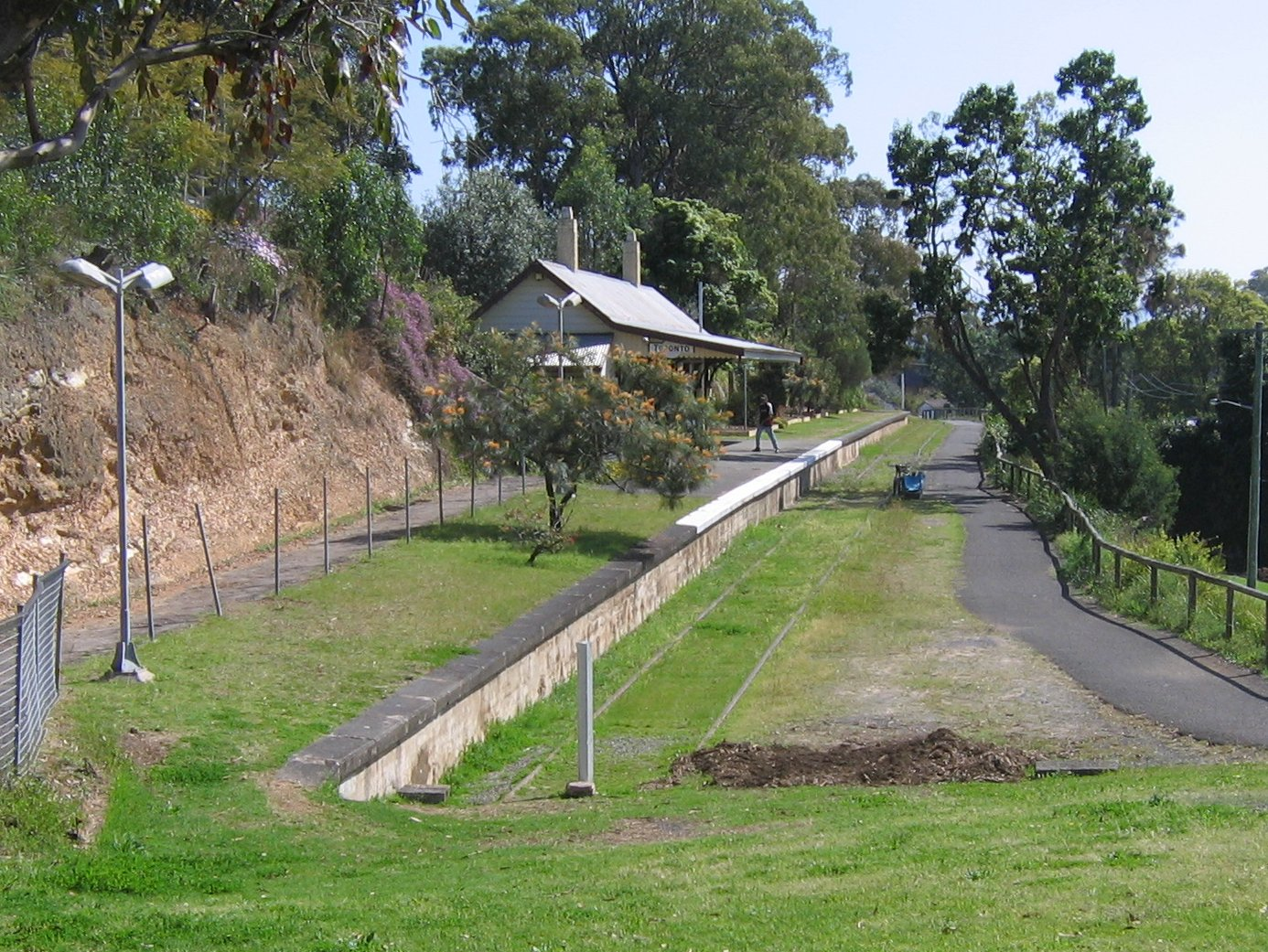
The closed railway station.

Toronto was served by train services on the Toronto railway line until March 1990, when the NSW Government closed the line because of low passenger levels. The train service was replaced by a bus service which connects Toronto with Fassifern railway station. Train services operating from Fassifern include services to Sydney and Newcastle as well as the XPT service to Brisbane. Toronto is well served by road links to Newcastle and Sydney and is approximately 8 minutes from the Sydney-Newcastle Freeway (M1).

The Toronto centre serves the local communities of Kilaben Bay, Coal Point, Carey Bay, Rathmines and Wangi Wangi to the south and Teralba, Booragul, Woodrising, Fennell Bay, Bolton Point, Fassifern and Blackalls Park to the north.

== Sports ==
Many Toronto residents are involved in water sports. The shore near the town has the Royal Motor Yacht Club and the Toronto Amateur Sailing Club. Yachts and cruisers are moored on the lake and smaller craft are pulled up onto private land at the waters edge.

Toronto is represented by three sports teams in Newcastle competitions. The Toronto Awaba Stags FC in the Northern NSW Football competition; the Macquarie Scorpions in the Newcastle Rugby League and also the Toronto Workers Kookaburras in the Newcastle cricket competition.

Toronto Netball Club plays at Westlakes Netball Association.

Nathan Outteridge, Olympic gold medal winner for sailing, sailed at the Toronto Amateur Sailing club in his youth.

Nathan Green, winner of the 2009 RBC Canadian Open, was born when his family lived at Toronto.

Toronto is also represented in Swimming by Macquarie Shores Swimming club, many Macquarie Shores swimmers compete at Regional and State level.

== Notes ==
1. Area calculation is based on NSW GNB maps.
