= Awaba, New South Wales =

Awaba
- Suburb
- Interactive map of Awaba
- Coordinates: 33°00′39″S 151°32′35″E
- Country: Australia
- State: New South Wales
- City: Greater Newcastle
- LGA: City of Lake Macquarie
- Location: 7 km (4.3 mi) W of Toronto; 21 km (13 mi) NNE of Morisset; 31 km (19 mi) WSW of Newcastle; 59 km (37 mi) N of The Entrance; 132 km (82 mi) N of Sydney
- Established: 1885

Government
  - State electorate: Lake Macquarie
  - Federal division: Hunter
- Elevation: 33 m (108 ft)

Population
  - Total: 430 (2021 census)
- Postcode: 2283
- Parish: Awaba
Suburbs around Awaba
Wakefield	Wakefield	Blackalls Park; Fassifern
Freemans Waterhole	Awaba	Toronto
Cooranbong	Eraring	Rathmines

Awaba (/əwɒbə/) is a town and locality in the City of Lake Macquarie, Greater Newcastle in New South Wales, Australia, inland from Toronto. The name Awaba is of Aboriginal origins, and means "flat or plain surface", referring to Lake Macquarie.

== History and facilities ==
The Aboriginal people in this area, the Awabakal, called this area Awaba (an Aboriginal word meaning flat or plain surface), which was the Aboriginal term for Lake Macquarie.

One of the first people to have a land grant in the area was Mr. W.A. Kingscote, who held a 1,100 acre property in the Parish of Awaba.

Later, the Crown Subdivision had its first plan approved on 20 August 1891. There were no street names in the first subdivision. The first street plans in 1892 consisted of Barton, Melbourne, Brisbane, Gosford, Nellinda, Heaton and Adelaide Streets.

=== Industries ===
Timber workers were among the first white settlers in the area. They included the Field, Wellard, Puddy and Murrell families, and many came from Mulbring, Brunkerville, Mount Vincent and Wallis Plains.

In 1885 a timber depot was established. In the same year Awaba was selected as a site for a railway construction depot. A large saw mill was an early feature of the town. In 1948 the Awaba State Coal Mine was established, largely through the efforts of J.M. Baddeley, who had been the wartime Minister for Mines.

At the outset in 1887 Awaba had a platform on the down side of the line, with a loop siding opposite. The Awaba to Wangi Wangi Power Station branch line opened on 25 May 1954. It was 6.5 miles long, but is now disused.

The post office opened on 1 October 1889, and a public school opened in June 1891.

Awaba developed in response to the needs of the railway contractors and homes were scattered over a wide area. One settler operated a small general store, another a primitive butcher's shop.

A water supply was established in 1948.
