= 2024 Lake Macquarie City Council election =

- 14 September 2024

All 13 seats on Lake Macquarie City Council 7 seats needed for a majority
- Registered: 166,305
- Turnout: 85.1%
- Mayor

| | First party | Second party | Third party |
|---|---|---|---|
| | | | LMI |
| Candidate | Adam Shultz | Melody Harding | Kate Warner |
| Party | Labor | Liberal | Lake Mac Inds |
| Primary vote | 47,167 | 28,857 | 26,713 |
| Percentage | 35.3% | 21.6% | 20.0% |
| Swing | ▼17.7 | ▼0.5 | ▲7.6 |
| TCP | 60.1% | | 39.9% |
| TCP swing | ▼9.1 | | ▲39.9 |
Mayor before election
Kay Fraser
Labor
Elected Mayor
Adam Shultz
Labor
- Councillors
- Turnout: 85.2%
| Party | Leader | Vote % | Seats | +/– |
|---|---|---|---|---|
| Labor | Adam Shultz | 35.2 | 5 | −1 |
| Liberal | Melody Harding | 23.1 | 3 | 0 |
| Lake Mac Inds | Kate Warner | 21.7 | 3 | 0 |
| Independents | —N/a | 5.5 | 1 | +1 |
This lists parties that won seats. See the complete results below.

The 2024 Lake Macquarie City Council election was held on 14 September 2024 to elect a mayor and twelve councillors to the City of Lake Macquarie. The election was held as part of the statewide local government elections in New South Wales.

Labor Party candidate Adam Shultz was elected mayor with 60.1% of the two-candidate-preferred vote, following the retirement of incumbent Kay Fraser. However, Labor lost its narrow majority on the council after the election of one independent, while the Liberal Party and Lake Mac Independents retained three seats each.

== Background ==
On 28 July 2023, Lake Mac Independents councillor Luke Cubis resigned, creating a vacancy in West Ward. His seat was not filled before the election after councillors voted unanimously against having a by-election.

In February 2024, the Liberal Party's Nick Jones was removed as a councillor for East Ward after missing three consecutive council meetings.

The boundaries of Lake Macquarie's three wards changed prior to the 2024 election. East Ward expanded to add parts of Warners Bay, while West Ward moved to include Barnsley and Holmesville. Additionally, North Ward gained Boolaroo, Lakelands, Macquarie Point and Speers Point.

== Electoral system ==
Like in all other New South Wales local government areas (LGAs), Lake Macquarie City Council elections use optional preferential voting. Under this system, voters are only required to vote for one candidate or group, although they can choose to preference other candidates. Lake Macquarie was one of 37 LGAs to have a direct mayoral election in 2024.

All elections for councillor positions are elected using proportional representation. Lake Macquarie has an Australian Senate-style ballot paper with above-the-line and below-the-line voting. The council is divided into three wards, each electing four councillors.

The election was conducted by the New South Wales Electoral Commission (NSWEC).

== Retiring councillors ==
=== Labor ===
- Kay Fraser (mayor) − announced 8 March 2024

== Candidates ==
=== Mayoral candidates ===
Candidates are listed in the order they appeared on the ballot.

| Party | Candidate | Background |
|---|---|---|
| Greens | Bryce Ham | Environmental activist |
| Liberal | Melody Harding | Educator and marriage celebrant |
| Labor | Adam Shultz | Councillor for East Ward |
| Our Local Community | John Gilbert | Former Lake Mac Independents councillor |
| Community First Inds | Rosmairi Dawson | Former Independent Lake Alliance councillor |
| Lake Mac Independents | Kate Warner | Councillor for East Ward |

=== Ward candidates ===
==== East ====
| Labor (Group A) | Independent (Group B) | Lake Mac Independents (Group C) | Greens (Group D) | Liberal (Group E) |
|---|---|---|---|---|
| 1. Adam Shultz; 2. Christine Buckley; 3. Stacey Radcliffe; 4. Joseph Steel | 1. Rowen Turnbull; 2. Kaciee Wagstaff; 3. Dyllan Harvey; 4. Tina Sulis | 1. Michael Hannah; 2. David Gibson; 3. John Edwards; 4. Allison Hannah | 1. Jane Oakley; 2. Elizabeth Riley; 3. Patricia Philippou; 4. Stephanee Reay Bartsch | 1. Matt Schultz; 2. Melody Harding; 3. Rod Chapman; 4. Dianne Volker |

==== North ====
| Lake Mac Independents (Group A) | Greens (Group B) | Liberal (Group C) | Labor (Group D) | Ungrouped |
|---|---|---|---|---|
| 1. Colin Grigg; 2. Tara Hall; 3. Daniel Secomb; 4. Timothy Sullivan | 1. Bryce Ham; 2. Gregory Watkinson; 3. Tal Nelson; 4. Andrew McLean | 1. Jack Antcliff; 2. Daniel Swane; 3. Susan Antcliff; 4. Mark Pauling | 1. Brian Adamthwaite; 2. Keara Conroy; 3. Mark Howells; 4. Gaurav Vijay | James McCorkell (Ind); Travis McCorkell (Ind); Daniel Smith (Ind) |

==== West ====
| Lake Mac Independents (Group A) | Our Local Community (Group B) | Greens (Group C) | Labor (Group D) |
|---|---|---|---|
| 1. Kate Warner; 2. Ashley Dorse; 3. Steve Graham; 4. Olenka Motyka | 1. Toni Bowyer; 2. Elizabeth Cooper; 3. Alan Hogan; 4. Paris Southee | 1. Ingrid Schraner; 2. Kim Grierson; 3. Kerry Suwald; 4. Charmian Eckersley | 1. Madeline Bishop; 2. David Belcher; 3. Mackenzie Robson; 4. Stephen Ryan |
| Community First Inds (Group E) | Liberal (Group F) | Independent (Group G) | Ungrouped |
| 1. Rosmairi Dawson; 2. Graham Davidson; 3. Janette Coulter; 4. Melissa Rogan | 1. Jason Pauling; 2. Nicholas Jones; 3. Julie Pauling; 4. Michael Uidam | 1. Anthony Swinsburg; 2. Lorna Edwards; 3. David Pickard; 4. Linda Lord | Eddie Milton (Ind) |

== Results ==
=== Mayoral results ===
2024 Lake Macquarie City Council election: Mayor
| Party | Candidate | Votes | % | ±% |
|---|---|---|---|---|
| Labor | Adam Shultz | 47,167 | 35.3 | –17.7 |
| Liberal | Melody Harding | 28,857 | 21.6 | –0.5 |
| Lake Mac Independents | Kate Warner | 26,713 | 20.0 | +7.6 |
| Greens | Bryce Ham | 13,119 | 9.8 | +9.8 |
| Community First Inds | Rosmairi Dawson | 10,473 | 7.8 | –4.6 |
| Our Local Community | John Gilbert | 7,468 | 5.6 | +5.6 |
| Total formal votes | | 141,648 | 94.5 | –1.6 |
| Informal votes | | 7,851 | 5.5 | +1.6 |
| Turnout | | 149,499 | 85.2 | +0.6 |
Two-candidate-preferred result
| Labor | Adam Shultz | 54,862 | 60.1 | –9.1 |
| Lake Mac Independents | Kate Warner | 36,336 | 39.9 | +39.9 |
| Labor hold | | | | |

Distribution of preferences: Lake Macquarie City Mayor
| Party | Candidate | Votes | Round 1 | | Round 2 | | Round 3 | | Round 4 | |
| Party | Candidate | Votes | Dist. | Total | Dist. | Total | Dist. | Total | Dist. | Total |
|---|---|---|---|---|---|---|---|---|---|---|
| Labor | Adam Shultz | 47,167 | 409 | 47,576 | 591 | 48,167 | 4,339 | 52,506 | 2,356 | 54,862 |
| Liberal | Melody Harding | 28,857 | 367 | 29,224 | 432 | 29,656 | 864 | 30,520 | Excluded | |
| Lake Mac Independents | Kate Warner | 26,713 | 801 | 27,514 | 2,465 | 29,979 | 1,807 | 31,786 | 4,550 | 36,336 |
| Greens | Bryce Ham | 13,119 | 206 | 13,325 | 594 | 13,919 | Excluded | | | |
| Community First Inds | Rosmairi Dawson | 10,473 | 620 | 11,093 | Excluded | | | | | |
| Our Local Community | John Gilbert | 7,468 | Excluded | | | | | | | |

=== Ward results ===
2024 Lake Macquarie City Council election: Ward results
| Party | Votes | % | Swing | Seats | Change |
|---|---|---|---|---|---|
| Labor | 46,239 | 35.2 | −4.0 | 5 | ▼1 |
| Liberal | 30,363 | 23.1 | −2.6 | 3 | Steady |
| Lake Mac Independents | 28,530 | 21.7 | +2.3 | 3 | Steady |
| Greens | 13,257 | 10.1 | +0.3 | 0 | Steady |
| Independents | 7,221 | 5.5 | +1.9 | 1 | ▲1 |
| Community First Inds | 2,942 | 2.2 | | 0 | Steady |
| Our Local Community | 2,819 | 2.1 | | 0 | Steady |
| Formal votes | 131,371 | 92.8 | | | |
| Informal votes | 10,133 | 7.2 | | | |
| Total | 141,504 | 100.0 | | 12 | |
| Registered voters / turnout | 166,305 | 85.1 | | | |

=== East ===
2024 Lake Macquarie City Council election: East Ward
| Party | Candidate | Votes | % | ±% |
|---|---|---|---|---|
| Labor | 1. Adam Shultz; 2. Christine Buckley (elected 1); 3. Stacey Radcliffe (elected 3); 4. Joseph Steel | 18,551 | 40.8 | −1.0 |
| Liberal | 1. Matt Schultz (elected 2); 2. Melody Harding; 3. Rod Chapman; 4. Dianne Volker | 11,620 | 25.5 | −0.9 |
| Lake Mac Independents | 1. Michael Hannah (elected 4); 2. David Gibson; 3. John Edwards; 4. Allison Hannah | 7,766 | 17.1 | +0.6 |
| Greens | 1. Jane Oakley; 2. Elizabeth Riley; 3. Patricia Philippou; 4. Stephanee Reay Bartsch | 4,053 | 8.9 | +0.1 |
| Independent | 1. Rowen Turnbull; 2. Kaciee Wagstaff; 3. Dyllan Harvey; 4. Tina Sulis | 3,511 | 7.7 | |
| Total formal votes | | 45,501 | 92.8 | |
| Informal votes | | 3,543 | 7.2 | |
| Turnout | | 49,044 | 85.9 | |

=== North ===
2024 Lake Macquarie City Council election: North Ward
| Party | Candidate | Votes | % | ±% |
|---|---|---|---|---|
| Labor | 1. Brian Adamthwaite (elected 1); 2. Keara Conroy (elected 4); 3. Mark Howells; 4. Gaurav Vijay | 17,122 | 37.9 | −4.7 |
| Liberal | 1. Jack Antcliff (elected 2); 2. Daniel Swane; 3. Susan Antcliff; 4. Mark Pauling | 10,822 | 24.0 | +2.2 |
| Lake Mac Independents | 1. Colin Grigg (elected 3); 2. Tara Hall; 3. Daniel Secomb; 4. Timothy Sullivan | 10,519 | 23.3 | +8.0 |
| Greens | 1. Bryce Ham; 2. Gregory Watkinson; 3. Tal Nelson; 4. Andrew McLean | 6,425 | 14.2 | +2.4 |
| Independent | James McCorkell | 141 | 0.3 | |
| Independent | Daniel Smith | 89 | 0.2 | |
| Independent | Travis McCorkell | 35 | 0.1 | |
| Total formal votes | | 45,153 | 93.7 | |
| Informal votes | | 3,015 | 6.3 | |
| Turnout | | 48,168 | 86.0 | |

=== West ===
2024 Lake Macquarie City Council election: West Ward
| Party | Candidate | Votes | % | ±% |
|---|---|---|---|---|
| Labor | 1. Madeline Bishop (elected 1); 2. David Belcher; 3. Mackenzie Robson; 4. Stephen Ryan | 10,566 | 26.0 | −7.4 |
| Lake Mac Independents | 1. Kate Warner (elected 2); 2. Ashley Dorse; 3. Steve Graham; 4. Olenka Motyka | 10,245 | 25.2 | −0.7 |
| Liberal | 1. Jason Pauling (elected 3); 2. Nicholas Jones; 3. Julie Pauling; 4. Michael Uidam | 7,921 | 19.5 | −9.3 |
| Independent | 1. Anthony Swinsburg (elected 4); 2. Lorna Edwards; 3. David Pickard; 4. Linda Lord | 3,388 | 8.3 | |
| Community First Inds | 1. Rosmairi Dawson; 2. Graham Davidson; 3. Janette Coulter; 4. Melissa Rogan | 2,942 | 7.2 | +4.0 |
| Our Local Community | 1. Toni Bowyer; 2. Elizabeth Cooper; 3. Alan Hogan; 4. Paris Southee | 2,819 | 6.9 | |
| Greens | 1. Ingrid Schraner; 2. Kim Grierson; 3. Kerry Suwald; 4. Charmian Eckersley | 2,779 | 6.8 | −1.9 |
| Independent | Eddie Milton | 57 | 0.1 | |
| Total formal votes | | 40,717 | 91.9 | |
| Informal votes | | 3,575 | 8.1 | |
| Turnout | | 44,292 | 83.2 | |
