= Munibung Hill =

Coordinates: 32°57′12″S 151°38′25″E

Munibung Hill Lake Macquarie, New South Wales
- Postcode(s): 2285
- Elevation: 169 m (554 ft)
- LGA(s): City of Lake Macquarie
- Region: Hunter
- County: Northumberland
- Parish: Kahibah
- State electorate(s): Lake Macquarie
- Federal division(s): Shortland
Suburbs around Munibung Hill:
Teralba	Boolaroo	Macquarie Hills
Teralba	Munibung Hill	Warners Bay
Lake Macquarie	Lake Macquarie	Warners Bay

Munibung Hill is the name of a hill in New South Wales which is in the suburbs of Macquarie Hills, Boolaroo, Speers Point and Warners Bay.

The name is believed to have been derived from an Aboriginal word meaning "fruit".

Munibung Hill – meaning ‘fruit’ – was gazetted on 23 December 1977, but we cannot establish who proposed the name and why it was chosen i.e. presuming there was bush tucker present on Munibung Hill which species or variety of fruit was it; and why not Kona-konaba, since the Hill was well known as a source of ochre.

== Fivefold Vision ==
This Five-fold Vision sets out a plan for Munibung Hill to be reinstated as a culturally significant site and for the reintroduction of some plant and animal species that were present pre-European settlement.

1. Geological and Cultural Heritage Park — Meeting and sharing place
2. Conservation area / Nature reserve — A refuge, a sanctuary, a safe house
3. Visitor Economy — Lookouts with outlooks
4. Rest and Recreation area — A breathing space, a connecting place
5. Observatory and Planetarium site — Learning & research place

This extensive ongoing consultation process has demonstrated that Munibung Hill warrants a much greater level of care than she is currently receiving.
