= West Wallsend Steam Tram Line =

Tram line in New South Wales, Australia

The West Wallsend Steam Tram Line in Australia was an extension of the tram line from Newcastle, New South Wales to Wallsend, New South Wales. Construction of the tram line began in April 1909 and opened for passenger services on 19 December 1910. The route from Newcastle to West Wallsend was 25 km (16 mi) long and took about one and a half hours. The line was standard gauge and the tram was powered by a steam motor which hauled two passenger cars or carriages.

== History ==
The tram service went from West Wallsend to Wallsend via Holmesville, Estelville, Edgeworth and Glendale. During the life of the tram line a couple of derailments occurred, in one of which the tram driver was killed. The last tram service ran on 2 November 1930.

== See also ==
- Trams in Newcastle, New South Wales
