= Cockle Creek railway station =

Railway station in New South Wales, Australia

Cockle Creek
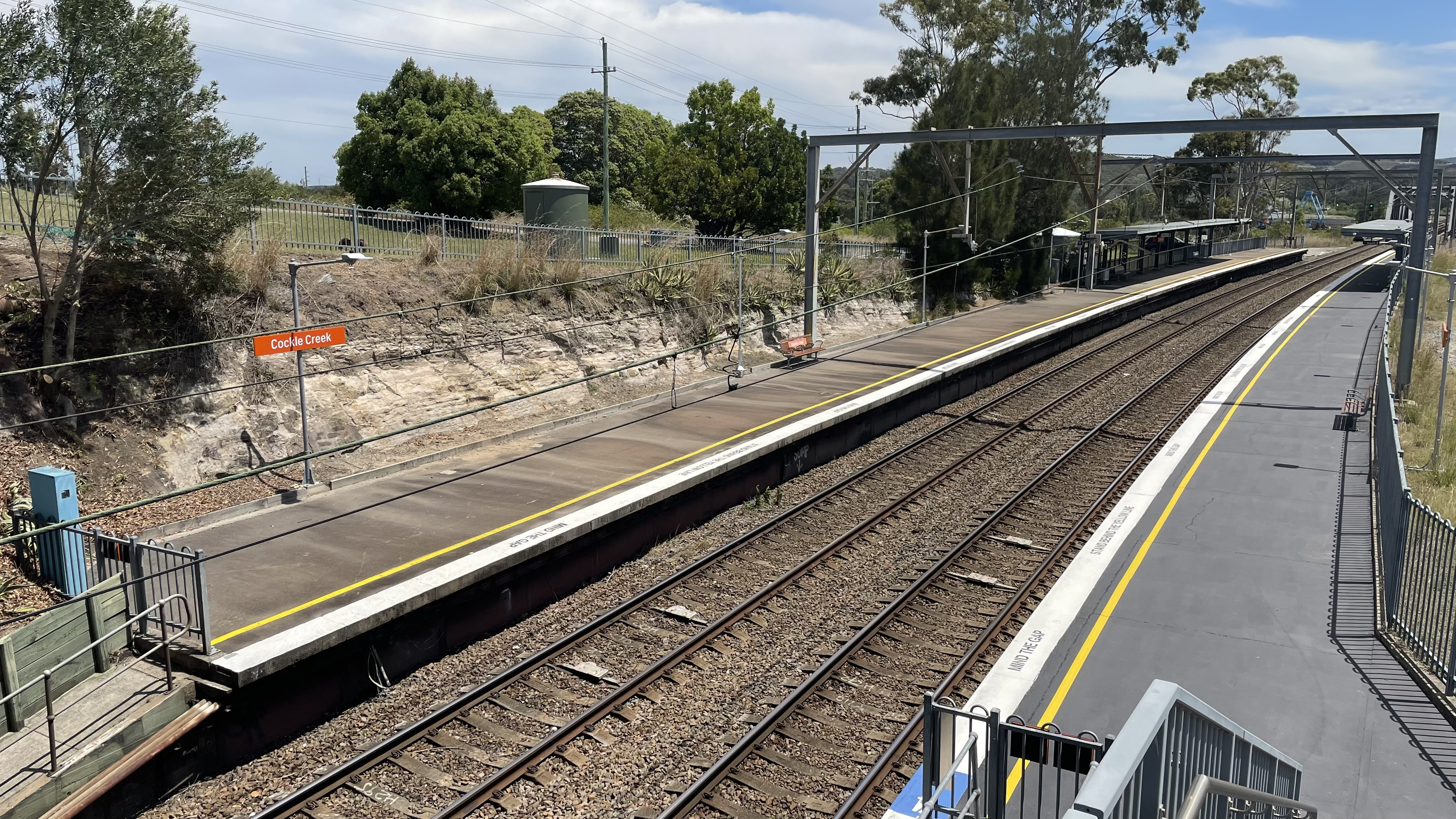
- Southbound view of the station platforms from the Lake Road overpass, November 2023

General information
- Location: Lake Road, Boolaroo; Australia
- Coordinates: 32°56′34″S 151°37′25″E
- Owner: Transport Asset Manager of New South Wales
- Operator: Sydney Trains
- Line: Main Northern
- Distance: 150.63 km (93.60 mi) from Central
- Platforms: 2 side
- Tracks: 2
- Connections: Bus

Construction
- Structure type: Ground
- Accessible: No

Other information
- Station code: CCK
- Website: Transport for NSW

History
- Opened: 15 August 1887; 139 years ago
- Rebuilt: 1957

Passengers
- 2025: 27,227 (year); 75 (daily) (Sydney Trains, NSW TrainLink)

Services
| Preceding station | Intercity Trains | Following station |
|---|---|---|
| Cardiff towards Newcastle Interchange | Central Coast & Newcastle Line | Teralba towards Central |
Location

Cockle Creek railway station is located on the Main Northern line in New South Wales, Australia. It serves the City of Lake Macquarie suburb of Boolaroo. The station is on the eastern side of Cockle Creek and a balloon loop exists west of the creek for the Teralba Colliery.

== History ==
The station opened on 15 August 1887. It was rebuilt on its present site in 1957 when a new bridge was built immediately south of the station. The station buildings were demolished in March 1993.

The station originally opened with four platforms (two side, one island), with the southern track pair being part of the Main Northern line and the northern track pair part of the former privately owned Caledonian Collieries railway line to West Wallsend, Seahampton, Killingworth, Barnsley and the now vanished town of Fairley, which joined the government line at Cockle Creek. This line carried mixed traffic, including passenger and freight trains, but was largely used for coal traffic until the last working mine, West Wallsend Extended Colliery at Killingworth was closed during an industrial slump in 1962. The freight lines were also used for coal trains from the Northern Rhondda Colliery on a separately owned private line adjacent to the Caledonian Railways line. The Rhondda Colliery line would later turn into the Hunter Railway Museum line before its exhibits were relocated to Dorrigo.

Although the area surrounding the railway station was once an industrial area, the eventual station's isolation has led to low patronage (getting just 20 passengers a day in 2013). A large Bunnings store opened across the road from the station in 2015, and a new residential development immediately south of the station is finishing completion, but when the large Bunnings store opened, a large roundabout was installed at the nearby intersection, making the pedestrian access to the station dangerous and inconvenient.

== Platforms and services ==
Cockle Creek has two side platforms. It is serviced by Sydney Trains Intercity Central Coast & Newcastle Line services travelling between Sydney Central, Gosford and Newcastle.

| Platform | Line | Stopping pattern | Notes |
| 1 | CCN | Services to Gosford & Sydney Central | |
| 2 | CCN | Services to Newcastle | |

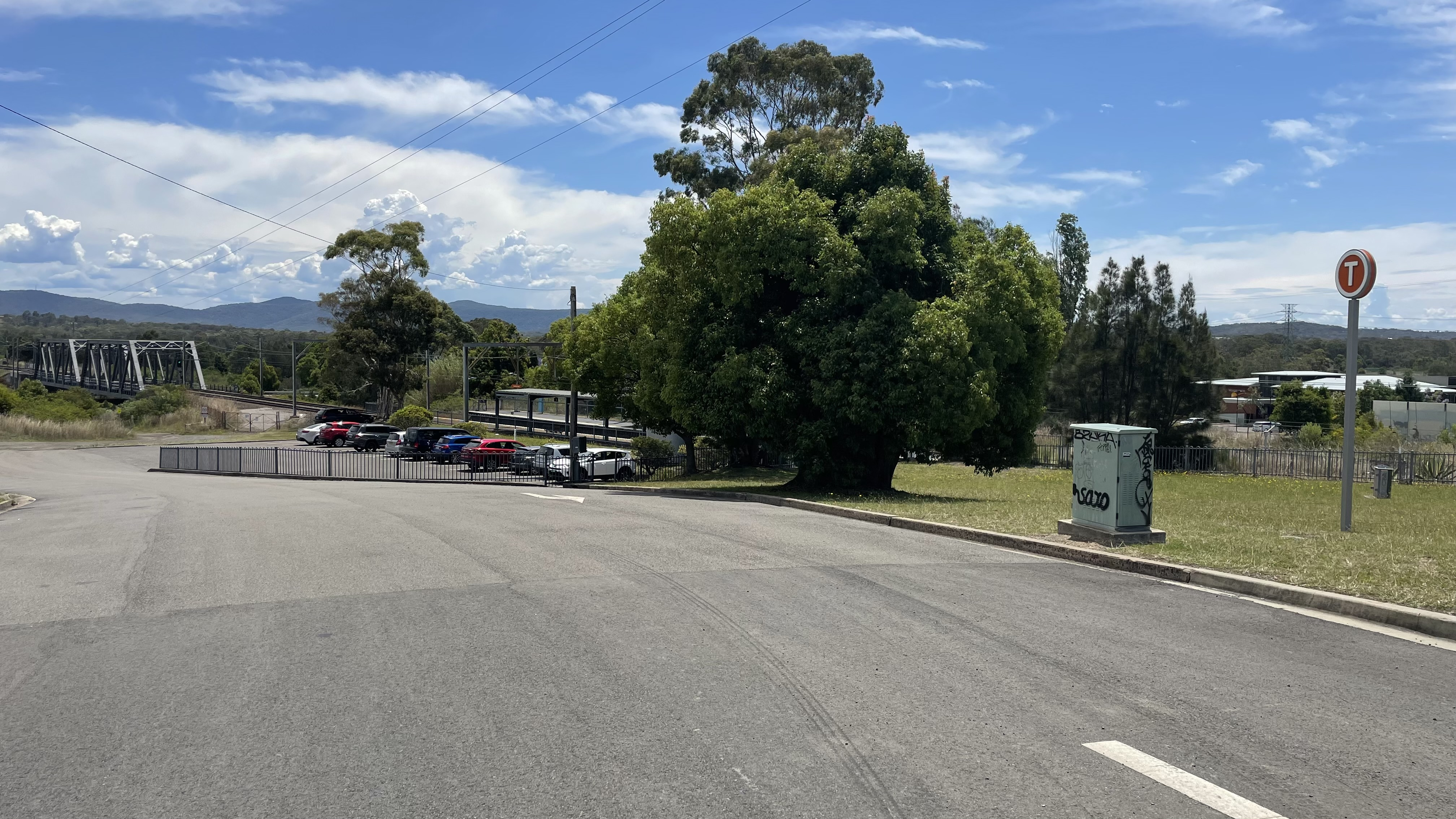
Entrance to carpark and Platform 1

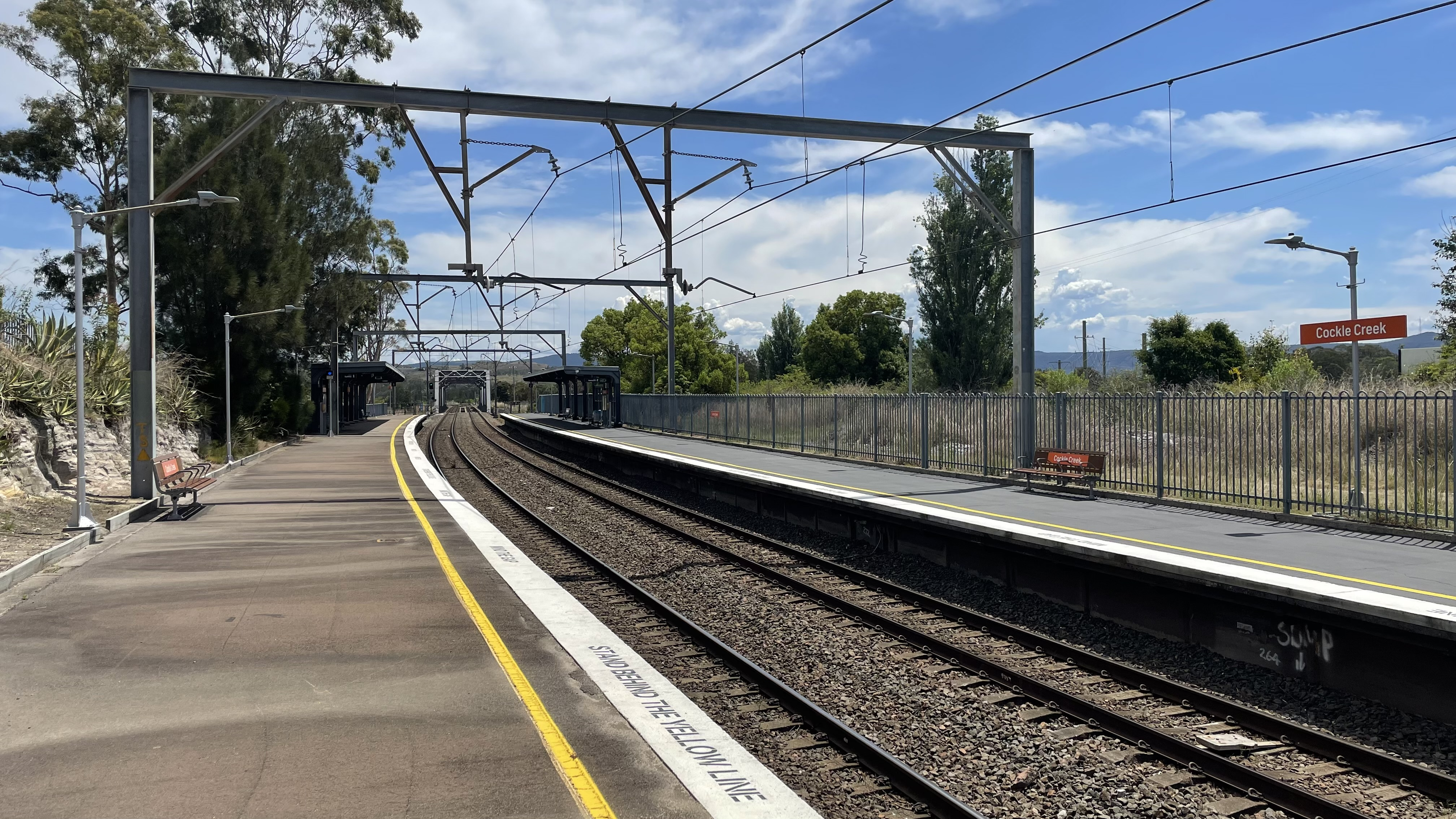
Platform 1 Southbound

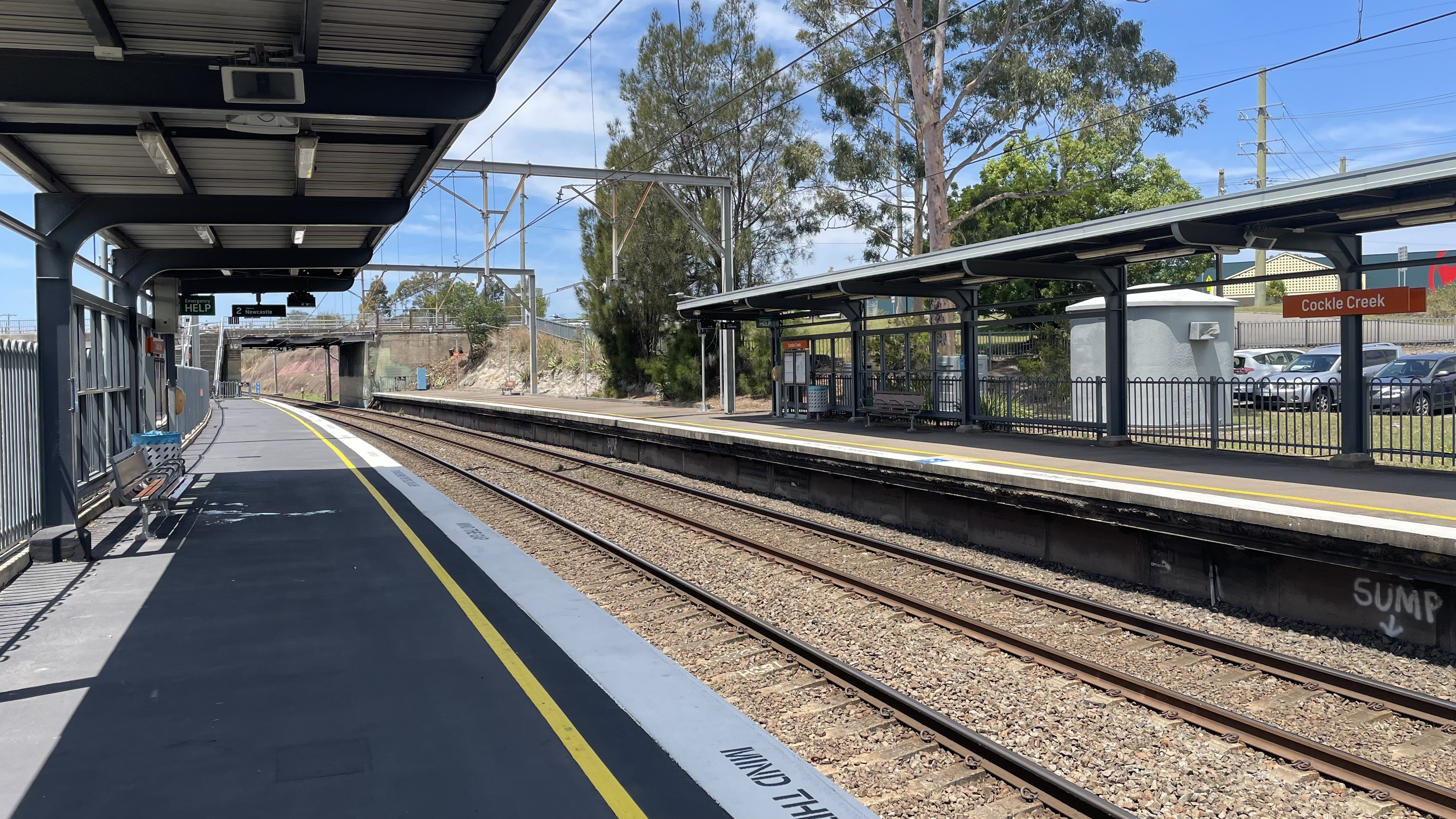
Platform 2 Northbound

== Transport links ==
Hunter Valley Buses operates two bus routes via Cockle Creek station, under contract to Transport for NSW:

- 270: Newcastle University to Toronto West
- 271: Stockland Glendale to Toronto

Newcastle Transport operates one bus route via Cockle Creek station, under contract to Transport for NSW:

- 44: Warners Bay to Kotara via Glendale, Cardiff & Macquarie Hills
