= Trams in Newcastle, New South Wales =

Tram system in Australia

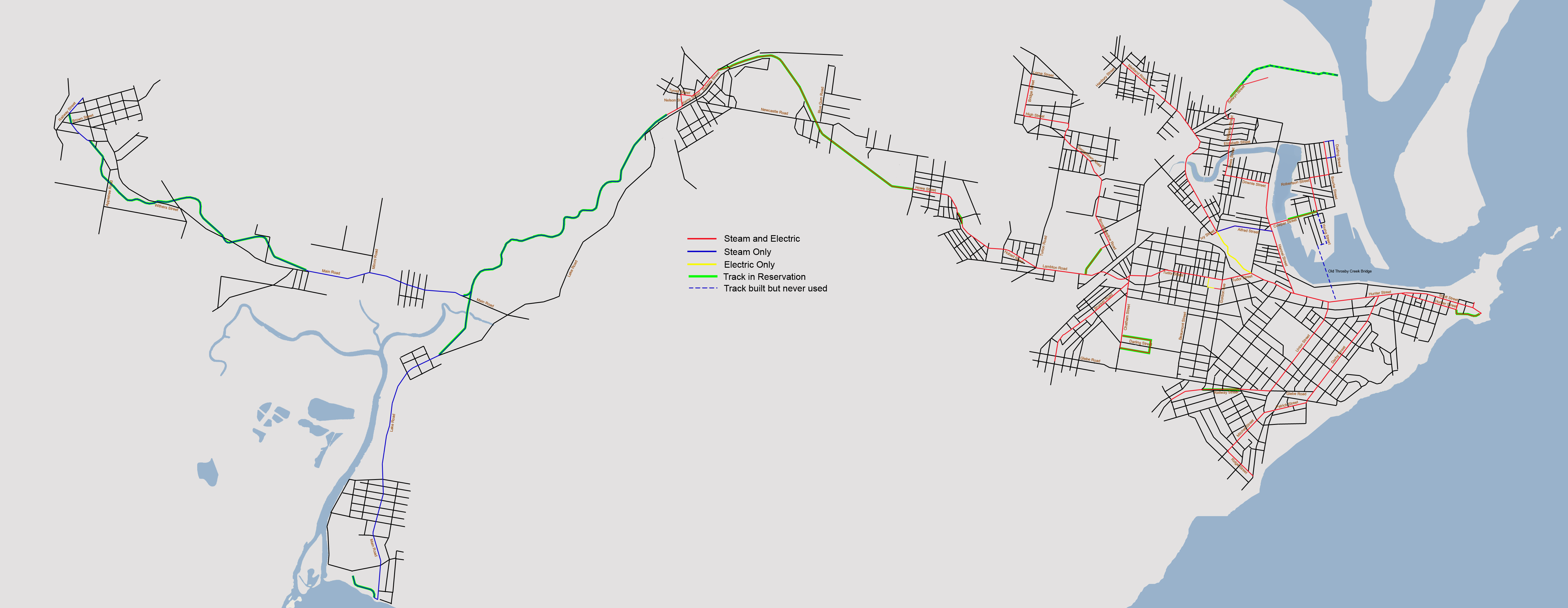
Tramway map of The Newcastle Tram System, covering Metropolitan Newcastle, New South Wales, Australia

The Newcastle Tram System was an extensive network that operated between Newcastle and the outer suburb of Wallsend from 1887 to 1950. At its peak the line extended from the city to Speers Point and West Wallsend. The service was rarely profitable, and low utilisation for a variety of reasons including the convenience of buses led to it closing and the tracks being removed.

== History ==
=== Steam ===
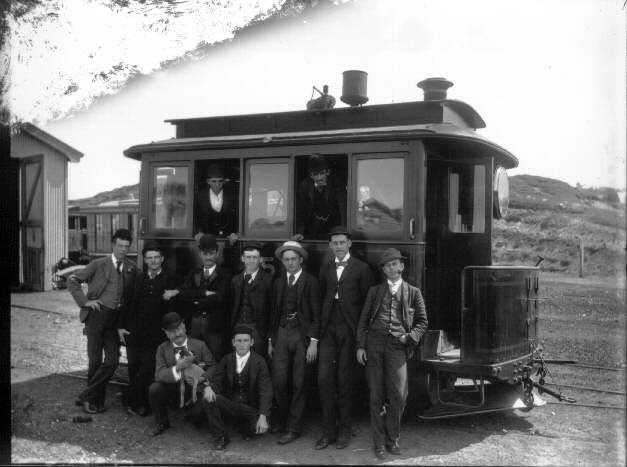
Steam tram at Parnell Place

Steam tram operations commenced in Newcastle on 6 July 1887, with a trial run between Newcastle and Plattsburg.

A depot was initially set up on the corner of Hunter and Perkins Streets. In 1893, the terminal was extended east to Parnell Place and the new larger depot constructed, with the original depot retained for light maintenance and repair work.

=== Electrification ===
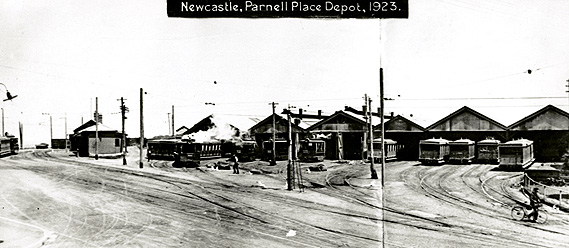
The Parnell Place tram depot

Electrification occurred in the early 1920s, the first electric tram running in October 1923. All lines were fully electric by the end of 1926 except the West Wallsend and Speers Point branch lines, which remained steam operated until they were closed.

With the pending electrification of the tram system, construction of a new depot was commenced at Gordon Street, Hamilton in 1918. The Hunter Street and Parnell Place depots were closed in 1927, as by then, all operations had been relocated to the Hamilton Depot. The network peaked at 35 miles.

=== Closure ===
In the 1930s poor patronage and competition from bus services led to the realisation that trams were not paying their way. During the Great Depression, there was not the political will to remove a service that provided jobs and cheap transport, however by the late 1930s this had changed and the Port Waratah and Carrington lines were closed in 1938. World War II delayed any further closures. Fuel rationing meant that buses were not allowed to run services where trams operated. The Parnell Place terminus was damaged during the Japanese shelling of Newcastle on 8 June 1942. The end of the war saw the Mayfield line close in 1948, the Wallsend line in 1949 with the remainder in 1950. The last service was run on 11 June 1950 on the Waratah line. As tram services in Newcastle declined, the Hamilton Depot was converted to a bus depot; which it continues as today operated by Newcastle Transport.

== Lines ==
=== Adamstown ===
Opened on 13 August 1900. Electric services to Adamstown commenced on 2 February 1925. The line was extended to Victoria Street just three months before the Carrington and Port Waratah lines were closed. A proposal to extend the line along Union Street to Rifle Street never eventuated and it closed on 17 April 1950.

=== Carrington ===
Originally proposed in February 1901, the line to Carrington did not enter service until 23 September 1912. Track was actually laid in 1905 across the old Throsby Creek Bridge, however there were disputes with the residents of Carrington about how the line would cross the railway line that ran along Cowper Street. The issue was never resolved and work was ceased before the line was completed. By 1912, the railway line in Cowper Street was no longer in use allowing the line to finally be built. However, it now branched from Mayfield line at Hannell Street and used the old railway bridge on Cowper Street. Electric services commenced on 15 August 1926. The Carrington and Port Waratah lines were the first electrified lines to close (the steam only West Wallsend and Speers Point services ended in 1930) when they ceased services on 19 November 1938.

=== Glebe ===
Originally called the Merewether line, it was changed to Glebe when the line to Merewether Beach was completed. It was opened on 19 April 1894. It was electrified in 1924 with the first electric service running on 2 November 1924. The line closed on 26 February 1950.

=== Mayfield ===
Construction of the line to Mayfield commenced June 1892. Construction included the building of a bridge over Throsby Creek. The line was opened 19 April 1893. Initially it terminated at Elizabeth Street, Tighes Hill with the extension to Hanbury Street opening in 1901. The Mayfield line was the first line in Newcastle to be electrified, opening on 15 December 1923. The section of track along Albert Street was never electrified. Connection of the electric line was along Hunter Street, through Tighes Hill. Plans to extend the line to Mayfield West and to connect it with the Waratah line never eventuated. The line closed on 26 September 1948.

=== Merewether ===
Originally proposed to branch off the Glebe line (then called the Merewether line). Construction of the line along Darby Street commenced on 29 March 1902, however insufficient funding saw the line terminate at Patrick Street. Services commenced on 3 November 1902. The extension to Ridge Street was eventually completed with services commencing on 21 September 1903. The line was originally called Merewether Beach, but was changed to Merewether when the Glebe line changed name. The line was electrified on 27 July 1924 and closed on 26 February 1950.

=== Port Waratah ===
Service commenced on 20 July 1914 as far as Estell Street. The line was initially called Maryville. The line was later extended in 1916, with services commencing on 16 December. The line was subsequently called Port Waratah, however it was often referred to as Steelworks. The line was electrified on 11 October 1926. The Carrington and Port Waratah lines were the first electrified lines to close (the steam only West Wallsend and Speers Point services ended in 1930) when they ceased services on 19 November 1938.

=== Port Waratah Wharf ===
A line to Port Waratah Wharf (also known as Walsh Island Ferry) was constructed in 1920. Direct competition with a free ferry from the Steelworks lead to the realization that the line would be under utilised. The workers at Walsh Island simply preferred the ferry. A trial was conducted on 11 February 1920, however the line was never opened, eventually being abandoned and removed.

=== Racecourse ===
First services commenced on 27 April 1907, though the balloon loop was not utilised until 1 July 1907. The loop was later enlarged towards the east to allow more trams to lay up while waiting for race goers. The first electric service commenced on 14 November 1925. A mixture of steam and electric services ran until all electric service ran on 29 May 1926. The line was closed 10 April 1950.

=== Speers Point ===
A branch to Speers Point was added to the West Wallsend line in an attempt to reduce the losses expected on the line. The first service ran on 15 January 1912. To accommodate the service, the Wallsend depot was enlarged. As with the West Wallsend line, it was never electrified. The last regular steam services ran on 1 November 1930. Several special services were run after this date; with the last running on 8 May 1931.

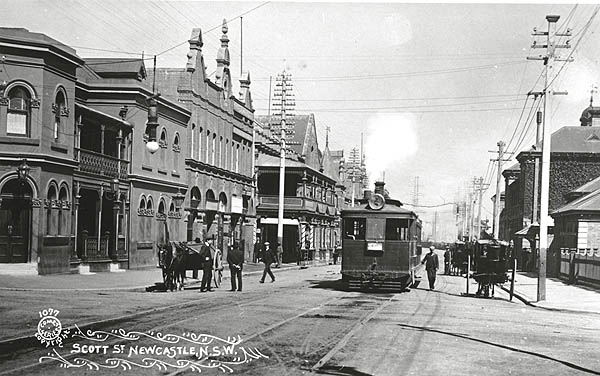
Tram in Scott Street

=== Wallsend and Plattsburg ===
The Wallsend line was the first tramway in Newcastle. It connected Newcastle with the main residential suburbs including Hamilton, Broadmeadow, Lambton, Jesmond, Plattsburg and Wallsend. The first services ran on 19 July 1887. The line was progressively electrified from 1924 the first fully electric service to Wallsend running on 26 December 1925. The line closed on 7 November 1949.

=== Waratah ===
The cost of Waratah line included the overhead bridge at Broadmeadow over the Main Northern railway line. This resulted in a large cost that required Parliamentary approval. It was the last line to be completed with the first service to running on 20 January 1915. Regular electric services commenced on 6 April 1925. The closure of this line marked the cessation of all tram operations in Newcastle. The last service ran on the evening of 10 June 1950.

=== West Wallsend ===
In 1910, a branch was constructed from Wallsend to West Wallsend. The first service ran on 19 September. A small depot was constructed at Wallsend to assist in the operation of this line. Due to the losses being suffered by the line, it was never electrified. The line was accident prone having been involved in at least three deaths in separate incidents. It was closed on 1 November 1930.

== Other provincial tramways in the Greater Newcastle region ==
Provincial tramways also operated within Morpeth, Toronto and Maitland.

== Rolling stock ==
Initially ex-Sydney self-propelled D1 class double decked trams were used on the system. Due to the Australian Agricultural Company rail bridge over Hunter Street and the overhead rail bridge to the Lambton Colliery between Hobart and Howe streets, the top deck was removed meaning that the capacity was severely reduced. The self-propelled trams were not popular and were rarely used and eventually removed from service in 1896.

In addition to the self-propelled trams, Baldwin style steam locomotives were used to haul C1 and C2 Class trailers. The locomotives originally required two men to operate, but were modified in service to allow for one man operation. The locomotives would haul up to four trailers depending on the demand. Six N type electric cars were also brought from Sydney. Their electrical parts were removed and they were used as steam trailers, however they were only used on the very busiest days, such as major race meetings. Other rolling stock was also used, including ballast trailers, water trailers, breakdown trailers, coal/coke trailers, a water sprinkler car, hearse cars and ash disposal trucks.

Newcastle operated 98 L/P-type Trams transferred from Sydney throughout the period of electric service. Some C-type Trams and other cars were retained for electric operations.

== Remnants ==
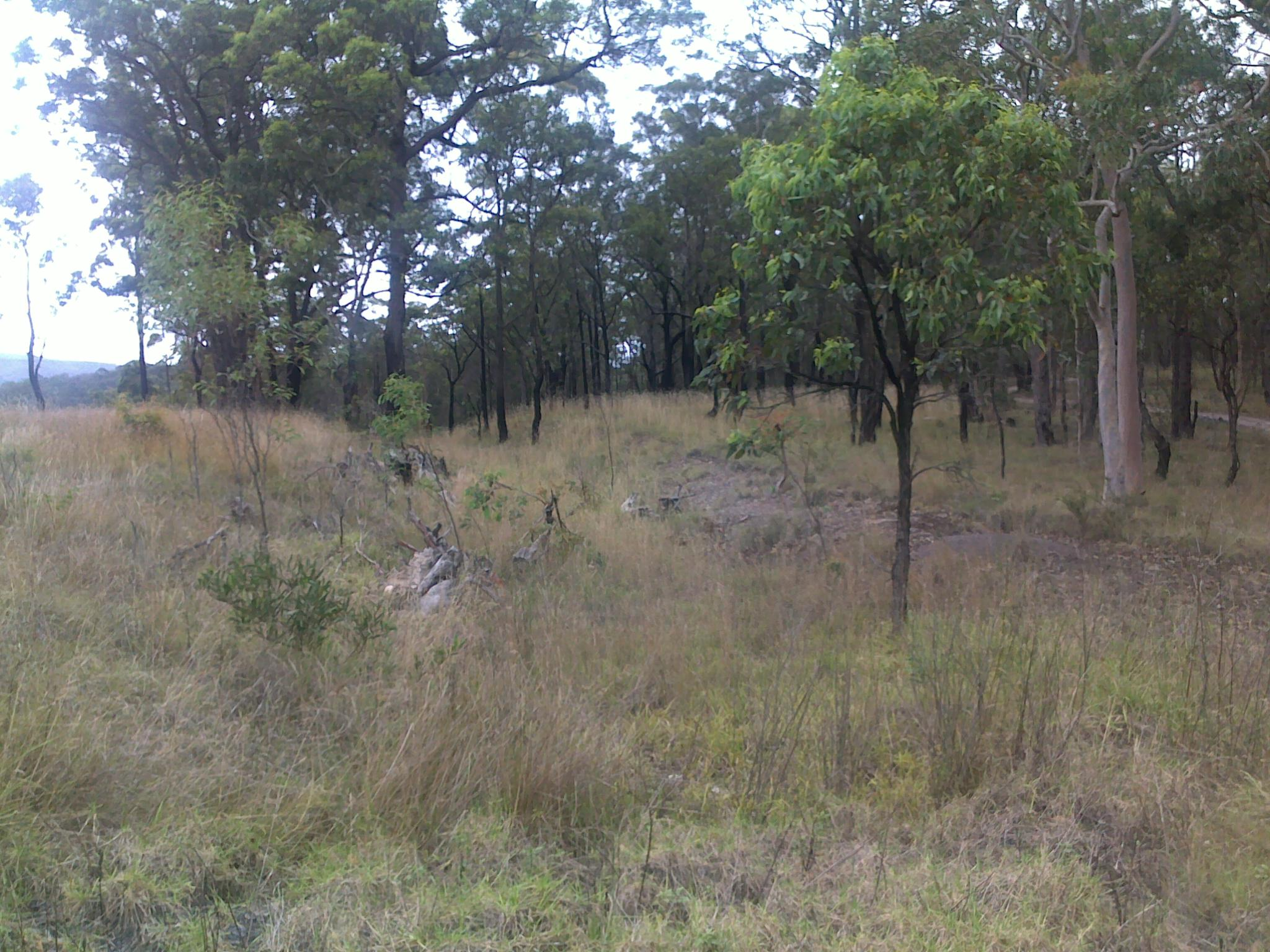
Cutting north of George Booth Drive on the West Wallsend line

Though all the tracks have been removed there is still evidence of the tram system throughout Newcastle. There are several cuttings and causeways once used by the tramways that are still visible. The cycleway through Jesmond Park is the most obvious reminder. It follows the path taken by the Wallsend Tram from Howe Street and includes a cutting through Lambton Hill.

A cycleway has been constructed between Wallsend and Glendale following the path of the Wallsend to West Wallsend Tram. The steady shallow gradient required for tram operations is ideal for cyclists.

=== Tramcar LP284 ===
The Newcastle Museum owns LP car LP284 which was acquired from the now defunct Newcastle Tramway Museum. LP 284 was moved to the depot for restoration and then put on display at the museum's new location.

== Revival ==
In February 2019, the Newcastle Light Rail line opened to link Newcastle East with Newcastle Interchange as part of a project to revitalise the city centre, replacing the existing heavy rail line.
