= Killingworth, New South Wales =

Killingworth Greater Newcastle, New South Wales
- Coordinates: 32°55′55″S 151°33′04″E
- Population: 690 (2021 census)
- Established: 1892
- Postcode(s): 2278
- Location: 23 km (14 mi) W of Newcastle
- LGA(s): City of Lake Macquarie
- Parish: Teralba
- State electorate(s): Lake Macquarie
- Federal division(s): Hunter
Suburbs around Killingworth:
	West Wallsend	Holmesville
	Killingworth	Barnsley
Awaba	Wakefield	Teralba

Killingworth is a small town located south of West Wallsend, New South Wales and east of the Sydney–Newcastle Freeway. It is part of the West Ward of the City of Lake Macquarie local government area in Greater Newcastle.

== History ==
Killingworth owes its origins to coal mining, which took place there from 1888 until the Great Depression, when it ceased for a time, and thereafter until the great slump in the industry in the 1960s. Caledonian Collieries Limited purchased the original unworked shafts at Killingworth in 1895 and continued its sinking to a depth of 880 feet. Two seams were subsequently mined, production commencing at Killingworth Colliery in October 1897. It was renamed West Wallsend Extended Colliery about 1915, although large K C letters continued to adorn the engine rooms. Their coal was shipped via its own branch which connected with the main private railway from Seahampton and West Wallsend to the government's main line at Cockle Creek.

Weekend photo of West Wallsend Extended Colliery with loaded wagons evident.

A huge gas explosion occurred in the pit at 5.25 a.m. on 7 December 1910. No human life was lost but a horse named 'Splash' was killed. The shaft's cages were blown right up the shaft to lodge in a massive tangled mess in the metal headframe. Production did not resume until August 1911.

A brick kiln was established at the colliery, as was a sawmill connected to the mine's railway by a spur. The timber used to construct many houses in Killingworth was produced here. In addition, a large wagon repair shop was opened in 1924 and not closed until April 1961, eighteen months prior to the colliery's final closure.

A public school operated from 1891 to 1892 and 1902–1941.
