= Edgeworth, New South Wales =

Edgeworth Greater Newcastle, New South Wales
- Coordinates: 32°54′54″S 151°37′05″E
- Population: 6,401 (2021 census)
  - Density: 941/km^{2} (2,438/sq mi)
- Postcode(s): 2285
- Elevation: 10 m (33 ft)
- Area: 6.8 km^{2} (2.6 sq mi)
- Location: 18 km (11 mi) W of Newcastle; 146 km (91 mi) N of Sydney; 30 km (19 mi) SE of Maitland; 64 km (40 mi) N of The Entrance; 76 km (47 mi) N of Gosford
- LGA(s): City of Lake Macquarie
- Parish: Teralba
- State electorate(s): Cessnock
- Federal division(s): Hunter
Suburbs around Edgeworth:
Holmesville	Cameron Park	Elermore Vale
Barnsley	Edgeworth	Glendale
Teralba	West Wallsend	Argenton

Edgeworth is a suburb of Greater Newcastle, City of Lake Macquarie local government area in New South Wales, Australia, located 18 kilometres (11 mi) west of Newcastle's central business district.

== History ==
=== Aboriginal ===
This area was traditionally occupied by the Awabakal people.

=== 1870s – 1890s ===
Edgeworth was originally known as Cocked Hat Creek in the 1870s and early 1880s. It was renamed to Young Wallsend in 1885. The Young Wallsend Coal Company opened a colliery in 1890. The colliery ceased operations in the early 1900s, and the site was bulldozed in 1992 to build a housing estate.

The Traveller's Rest Hotel (now Edgeworth Tavern) opened in the 1890s.

The first post office opened in February 1891.

Young Wallsend School (now Edgeworth Public School) opened in April 1891. The schoolteacher's residence is heritage listed.

=== 1900s – 1940s ===
St Ann's Church was erected in 1910. It was situated on Main Road, but was relocated or demolished some time after April 1991.

The first tram line was opened in 1910, connecting Glendale to West Wallsend via Main Road. The line was closed in 1930. A tramway from Brush Creek to Speers Point was opened in 1912. The Speers Point Service was closed in the 1920s, but a shuttle service continued to run between Cockle Creek Station and Speers Point during holidays. The lines were never electrified, and the tram rails were removed in 1935.

Salty Creek, also known as Sandy Bottom, was home to the Salty Creek Recreational Area in the early 1900s. It held the headquarters of the West Wallsend Swimming Club, who hosted swimming carnivals attended by local clubs. The area lost popularity in the 1940s, partly due to pollution.

=== 1950s – present ===
The former Salty Creek Recreational Area became the Salty Creek Speedway in 1958. The site closed in the 1970s.

Salty Creek Public School (now Edgeworth Heights Public School) opened in January 1958.

Piped sewage was connected in 1959.

In December 1960, Young Wallsend adopted its present name in honour of the geologist Sir Tannatt William Edgeworth David who, arriving in New South Wales in 1882, pioneered geological surveying of the coal seams in the Hunter Valley.

The Hawkins Masonic Village was opened in 1972.

== Education ==
Edgeworth has three schools: Edgeworth Public School, Edgeworth Heights Public School, and St. Benedict's Primary School.

== Sport and leisure ==
Edgeworth is home to the Edgeworth Eagles soccer club and the Sugar Valley Netball Club. The Edgeworth Sport and Rec Club provides bowls.

The Lake Macquarie Live Steam Locomotive Society has been running model steam trains in Edgeworth since 1969.
