= List of mayors of Lake Macquarie =

This is a list of mayors and shire presidents of the City of Lake Macquarie and its predecessors in the Hunter Region of New South Wales

The Shire of Lake Macquarie was proclaimed on 6 March 1906. It became a municipality on 1 March 1977 and a city on 7 September 1984. The Shire was represented by a Shire President and 16 aldermen. When it became a municipality in 1977, the President's title changed to Mayor, but the aldermen's title remained unchanged until the passage of the Local Government Act 1993.

== Chairman temporary (1st) council ==
- J W. Stenhouse

== Shire president (1906–77) ==
- S. Croudace – (1906–10)
- J. Talbot – (1910–11)
- W M. Beath – (1912)
- S. Croudace – (1913–14)
- R. Gormon – (1914–15)
- W. M. Beath – (1916)
- J. G. Desreaux – (1916–17)
- F. C. Hely – (1917–18)
- J. Johnston – (1918–19)
- W. M. Beath (1919–20)
- T C. Frith – (1920)
- J. G. Desreaux – (1920–21)
- W. M. Beath – (1922–23)
- H. Marks JP (1923–25)
- J. G. Desreaux – (1926–27)
- G. Pearce (1928–29)
- H. S. Richards – (1930–31)
- J. Johnson – (1931–33)
- G. Pearce – (1933–36)
- C. H. Wilson – (1937–38)
- T. A. Johnson – (April 1938)
- T. I. Johnson JP – (1938–39)
- T. A. Johnson – (1939–40)
- C. H. Wilson – (1940–41)
- J. P. Kenny – (1942–43)
- B. A. Allen – (1943–44)
- J. P. Kenny – (1945)
- L. P. Gain – (1945)
- R. Chapman (CPA) – (1946–47)
- J. P. Kenny – (1947–49)
- L. J. Parsons – (1950)
- C. S. Nichols – (1951–52)
- J. J. Hanlon – (1952)
- C. Hazell – (1953–55)
- J. Brown – (1955–59)
- T. R. Pendlebury MBE – (1959–68)
- M. L. Hunter MP – (1969)
- W. E. R. Smith – (1969–71)
- W. H. MacDonald – (1971–72)
- W. E. R. Smith – (1972–74)
- E. Lenaghan OAM – (1974–75)
- J. A. Edwards – (1975–76)

== Mayor of the Municipality (1977–84) ==
- Mayor Geoff R. Pasterfield – (1977–84)

== Mayor of the city (1984–present) ==
No.	Potrait	Name	Election	Term of Office			Political Party
No.	Potrait	Name	Election	Term Start	Term Ended	Time In Office	Political Party
1		Geoff R. Pasterfield	-	7 September 1984	26 September 1987	3 Years, 19 Days	Independent
2		Ivan Welsh	1987	26 September 1987	14 September 1991	3 Years, 11 Months, 19 Days	Independent
3		Douglas Carley	1991	14 September 1991	9 September 1995	3 Years, 11 Months, 26 Days	Labor
4		John Kilpatrick AM	1995 1999	9 September 1995	27 March 2004	8 Years, 6 Months, 18 Days	Independent
5		Greg Piper	2004 2008	27 March 2004	8 September 2012	8 Years, 5 Months, 12 Days	Independent
6		Jodie Harrison	2012	8 September 2012	10 September 2016	4 Years, 2 Days	Labor
7		Kay Fraser	2016 2021	10 September 2016	14 September 2024	8 Years, 4 Days	Labor
8		Adam Shultz	2024	14 September 2024	Incumbent		Labor

== Notes ==
The longest-serving mayor in the city of Lake Macquarie was Cr J E. Kilpatrick, with twelve years as the mayor of Lake Macquarie. J E. Kilpatrick is closely followed by the only mayor to serve as president during the local government's time as a municipality and also to serve as the first mayor of the city of Lake Macquarie, Mr G R. Pasterfield, with eleven years as municipality president and city mayor. The shortest-serving mayor or shire president was M. L. Hunter MP, who resigned as shire president after winning the NSW state electoral division of Lake Macquarie in 1969 after nine months as shire president.

== Election results ==
=== 2024 ===
2024 Lake Macquarie City Council election: Mayor
Party	Candidate	Votes	%	±%
Labor	Adam Shultz	47,167	35.3	–17.7
Liberal	Melody Harding	28,857	21.6	–0.5
Lake Mac Independents	Kate Warner	26,713	20.0	+7.6
Greens	Bryce Ham	13,119	9.8	+9.8
Community First Inds	Rosmairi Dawson	10,473	7.8	–4.6
Our Local Community	John Gilbert	7,468	5.6	+5.6
Total formal votes		141,648	94.5	–1.6
Informal votes		7,851	5.5	+1.6
Turnout		149,499	85.2	+0.6
Two-candidate-preferred result
Labor	Adam Shultz	54,862	60.1	–9.1
Lake Mac Independents	Kate Warner	36,336	39.9	+39.9
Labor hold				

Distribution of preferences: Lake Macquarie City Mayor
Party	Candidate	Votes	Round 1		Round 2		Round 3		Round 4	
Party	Candidate	Votes	Dist.	Total	Dist.	Total	Dist.	Total	Dist.	Total
Labor	Adam Shultz	47,167	409	47,576	591	48,167	4,339	52,506	2,356	54,862
Liberal	Melody Harding	28,857	367	29,224	432	29,656	864	30,520	Excluded	
Lake Mac Independents	Kate Warner	26,713	801	27,514	2,465	29,979	1,807	31,786	4,550	36,336
Greens	Bryce Ham	13,119	206	13,325	594	13,919	Excluded			
Community First Inds	Rosmairi Dawson	10,473	620	11,093	Excluded					
Our Local Community	John Gilbert	7,468	Excluded							

=== 2021 ===
2021 New South Wales mayoral elections: Lake Macquarie
Party	Candidate	Votes	%	±%
Labor	Kay Fraser	69,105	53.0	+8.3
Liberal	Jason Pauling	28,824	22.1	+1.6
Lake Mac Independents	Luke Cubis	16,206	12.4	+7.7
Independent	Rosmairi Dawson	16,201	12.4	+12.4
Total formal votes		130,336	96.1	
Informal votes		5,265	3.9	
Turnout		135,601	84.6	
Two-candidate-preferred result
Labor	Kay Fraser	75,575	69.2	
Liberal	Jason Pauling	33,685	30.8	
Labor hold		Swing		

=== 2012 ===
2012 New South Wales mayoral elections: Lake Macquarie
Party	Candidate	Votes	%	±%
Labor	Jodie Harrison	37,202	32.8	+6.6
Independent Lake Alliance	Wendy Harrison	28,944	25.6	−35.6
Liberal	Ken Paxinos	25,367	22.4	+22.4
Independent	Jim Sullivan	9,831	8.7	+8.7
Greens	Phillipa Parsons	8,503	7.5	−5.1
Independent	Arjay Martin	3,424	3.0	+3.0
Total formal votes		113,276	93.8	
Informal votes			6.2	
Turnout			84.2	
Two-candidate-preferred result
Labor	Jodie Harrison	43,956	52.2	
Independent Lake Alliance	Wendy Harrison	40,296	47.8	
Labor gain from Independent Lake Alliance		Swing		
