= Boolaroo =

- Suburb
- Coordinates: 32°57′30″S 151°37′30″E
- Country: Australia
- State: New South Wales
- City: Newcastle
- LGA: City of Lake Macquarie
- Location: 19 km (12 mi) W of Newcastle; 10 km (6.2 mi) WNW of Charlestown

Government
  - State electorate: Lake Macquarie
  - Federal division: Shortland

Area
  - Total: 4.1 km^{2} (1.6 sq mi)

Population
  - Total: 1,636 (2021 census)
  - Density: 399/km^{2} (1,033/sq mi)
- Postcode: 2284
- Parish: Kahibah
Suburbs around Boolaroo
Argenton	Argenton	Cardiff
Teralba	Boolaroo	Macquarie Hills
Teralba	Speers Point	Lakelands

Boolaroo is a suburb and former town of Greater Newcastle, city of Lake Macquarie, in New South Wales, Australia.

== Geography ==
The suburb is located 166 kilometres (103 mi) from Sydney and is 18 kilometres (11 mi) southwest of Newcastle's central business district in Lake Macquarie's West Ward.

Boolaroo borders a number of well-known towns and suburbs within the Lake Macquarie Region, including Warners Bay and Speers Point, and, for a small strip of land, fronts onto Lake Macquarie itself.

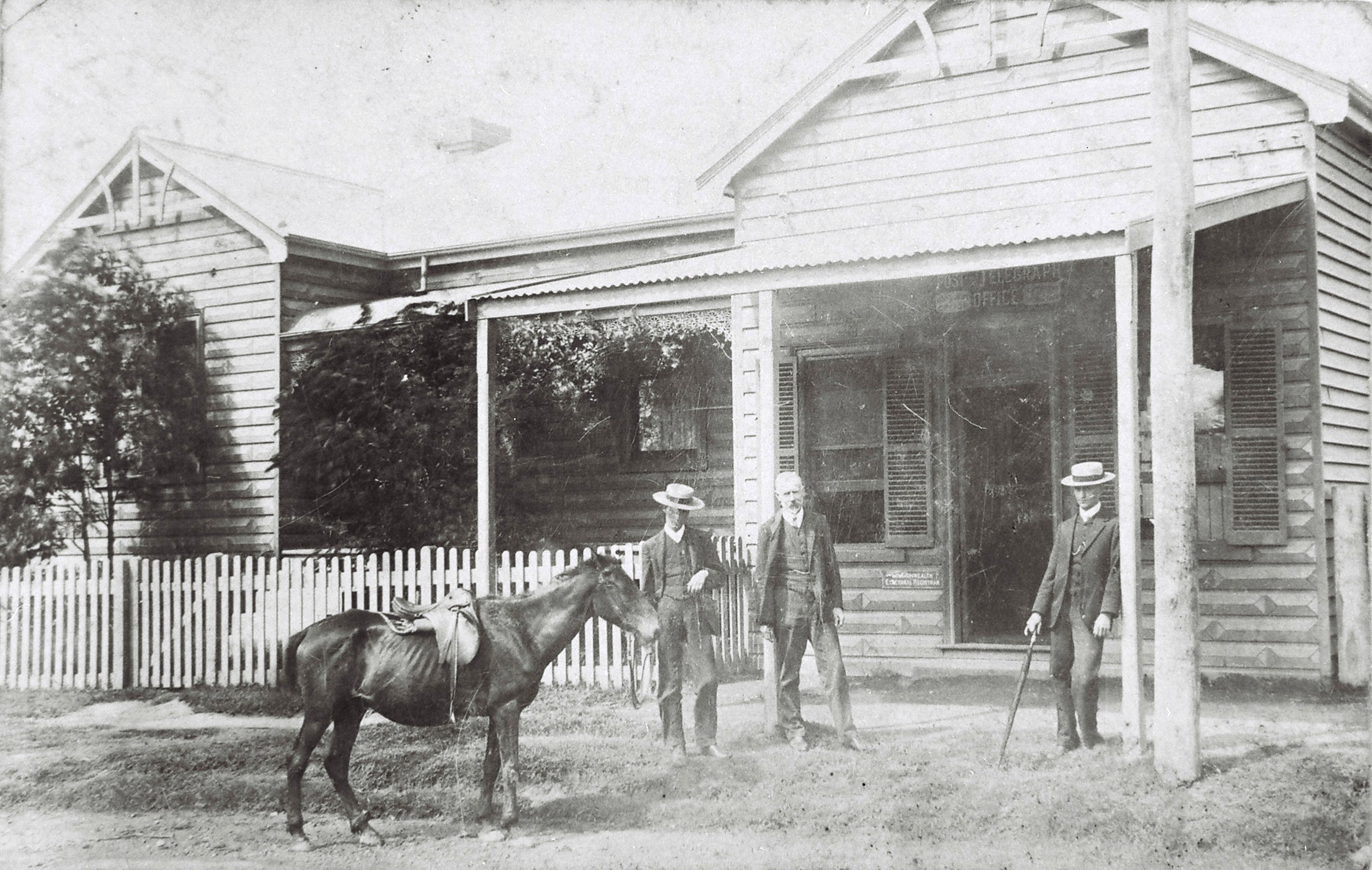
Boolaroo Post Office, 1908

== History ==
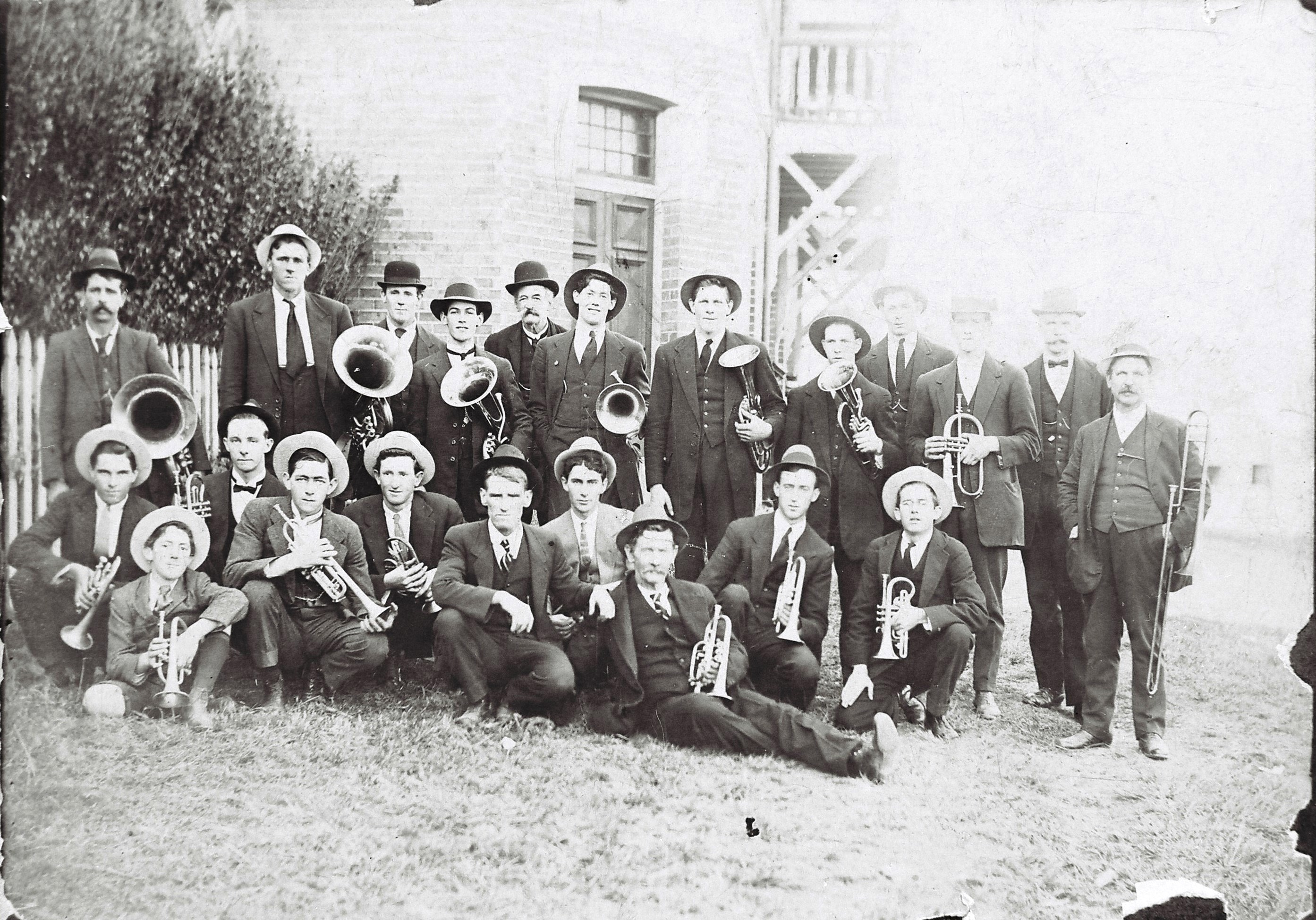
Boolaroo District and Sulphide Brass band, circa 1914

The Aboriginal people, in this area, the Awabakal, were the first people of this land.

The Aboriginal meaning of Boolaroo is 'place of many flies' or 'place of may flies'.

It was founded as a village in 1829 and proclaimed a town in 1896.

The Boolaroo Jockey Club ran race meetings in the town from 1907 to 1931.

It was the epicentre of the 1989 Newcastle earthquake.

The suburb's boundaries were defined on 31 May 1991, and amended on 10 September 2001.

It is unclear when Boolaroo was redesignated from a town to a suburb.

== Demographics ==
In the 2016 census, Boolaroo recorded a population of 1,039 people, 50.5% female and 49.5% male. The median age of the Boolaroo population was 42 years, 4 years above the national median of 38, with 88.0% of people living in Boolaroo were born in Australia. The other top responses for country of birth were England 1.9%, New Zealand 1.7%, Philippines 1.0%, Scotland 0.4% and Wales 0.4%. 94.0% of people spoke only English at home; the next most common languages were 1.1% Tagalog, 0.4% Mandarin, 0.3% French, 0.3% Italian and 0.3% Serbo-Croatian/Yugoslavian, so described.

In the 2021 census, Boolaroo recorded a population of 1,636 people, 52.0% female and 48.0% male. The median age of the Boolaroo population was 39 years, 1 year above the national median of 38, with 85.6% of people living in Boolaroo were born in Australia. The other top responses for country of birth were England 2.4%, New Zealand 1.3%, South Africa 0.7%, India 0.6%, and Scotland 0.4%. 90.5% of people spoke only English at home; the next most common languages were 0.6% German, 0.6% Afrikaans, 0.4% Hindi, 0.3% Arabic, and 0.3% Gujarati.

== Amenities ==
Boolaroo previously housed a lead/zinc smelter, owned by the former Pasminco (now Zinifex) however the site has been cleared since the smelter ceased operations on 12 September 2003.

Boolaroo is home to several churches of various denominations, as well as Boolaroo Public School, a library, a cinema (which was partially destroyed in the 1989 Newcastle earthquake) and a number of shops, including a small supermarket and a military disposal store.

== Transport ==
Within Boolaroo is the Cockle Creek railway station, a small station on the Central Coast & Newcastle Line.

== See also ==
- Boolaroo Racecourse
