= Cardiff High School, New South Wales =

School in Lake Macquarie, Australia

Coordinates: 32.9508°S 151.6700°E

Cardiff High School
- Cardiff, New South Wales; Hunter Region; Lake Macquarie, NSW; Australia

Information
- Type: Government-funded
- Motto: Know Thyself
- Established: 1963; 63 years ago
- Educational authority: New South Wales Department of Education
- Principal: Josh Gane
- Years taught: 7–12
- Colors: Teal; Black; White
- Website: cardiff-h.schools.nsw.gov.au

Cardiff High School is a government-funded co-educational comprehensive secondary school, located in the suburb of Cardiff in the city of Lake Macquarie, New South Wales, Australia, operated by the New South Wales Department of Education.

The school intake catchment is provided by Cardiff Public, Cardiff South Public, Cardiff North, Hillsborough Public and Garden Suburb Public schools. In 2024 the enrollment was 722 students.

The first principal, Mr L.T. Richardson, designed the school badge and chose its motto, “Know Thyself”. The shield within the badge, surrounded by a laurel wreath, contains representations of education – the stylus, (writing), the tree (knowledge), the lantern (learning) and the book (wisdom). With the schools colours of green and gold representing the wattle trees growing in the area.

In 2009 the school changed colours and uniform to Teal, Black and White.

== History ==
In the 1950s the Department of Education instigated a program throughout the state which saw several new High Schools in the Newcastle district built.

Cardiff High was conceptionalised in 1957 and the plan formed to have the school up and running by 1961, on a dairy farm that had once belonged to the Edwards Family during the 19th and early 20th centuries. It wasn't until the last week of school in December 1962 that the first students arrived. Only the 1st and 2nd form (the equivalent of Years 7 and 8) students attended as the school was still being constructed.

The school was officially opened on 9 October 1964, by Mr Wetherell, the minister for education with a population of 390.

The growth of Cardiff High School continued with the construction of a new dedicated library building started in 1982 and opened to staff and students in 1984. 1986 saw extensions to the admin building, doubling the original size.

Principals

- Mr. Josh Gane (2021–present)
- Mr. Gareth Erskine (2014–2020)
- Mrs. Suzanne Russell (2007–2013)
- Mr. Trevor Swan (1993–2006)
- Mr. Barry Kelly (1986–1992)
- Mr. Ken Wellham (1981–1985)
- Mr. Jim Parkes (1974–1980)
- Mr. Alan Coutts (1964–1973)
- Mr. Tom Richardson (1962–1963)

== Sport ==
=== Sports houses ===
The names of the four sporting houses were chosen with particular care, based upon the four symbols on the original school badge.

The four that were chosen were:

- Valtiri, means a tree, and is represented by the colour green.
- Yirrig is a writing implement, symbolized by the pen and the colour blue.
- Kalori, means message stick, with its symbol the book and its colour, yellow.
- Waru, means a fire stick, represented by the lantern and the colour red.

=== Sports achievements ===
Cardiff High School has seen success on the State and Regional level in a variety of sports. With the 1980s being the Sport Decade.

Among the most successful of these teams were:

1979

- Basketball – Shell Cup Champions
- Lions Cup Australian Rules team – Runners Up

==== 1980 ====
- Chess State Champions
- Lions Cup Australian Rules team – Runners Up
- Table Tennis – Regional champions.
- Golf – Regional champions.

==== 1981 ====
- Grade Winter sport both girls and boys’ teams won overall points score in. This was the first time for Cardiff High School for either boys or girls, and the first time any school won both.

==== 1986 ====
- Bill Turner Boys Soccer Team – State Champions (Coach: Doug Mungoven)
- Lions Cup Australian Rules team – State Champions (Coach: Alan Shaw)

==== 1987 ====
- Rudi Roth Girls Soccer team – Regional Champions (Coach: Iris Green)
- Girls Touch State Knockout team – Runners Up

==== 1989 ====
- Lions Cup Australian Rules team – State Champions (Coach: Alan Shaw)

== Notable events ==
In the 90s a forging of a sister-school relationship with Tanagura Junior High, in Japan. The first exchange students visited Tanagura in July 1991, beginning the tradition of regular group exchange visits which are still carried on today.

The first school magazine, Munibung, was produced in 1962. It has a tradition of half a century of uninterrupted publication.

== Notable alumni ==
- Yahoo Serious – Actor, director, writer and producer. Films include Young Einstein, Reckless Kelly, Mr. Accident.
- Dein Perry – Australian tap dancer and founder of tap dance production Tap Dogs. Film credits include Bootmen and choreographic work on Happy Feet 2.
- Ashley Gordon – First player signed by the Newcastle Knights.
- Daniel McBreen – International football player and TV commentator.
- Timana Tahu – Dual international Rugby League & Union for Australia. 2001 NRL Grand Final winner Newcastle Knights.
- James Nitties – Professional golfer played on the PGA Tour.
