= Cardiff South, New South Wales =

Cardiff South
- Suburb
- Coordinates: 32°57′11″S 151°39′43″E
- Country: Australia
- State: New South Wales
- City: Newcastle
- LGA: City of Lake Macquarie
- Location: 14 km (8.7 mi) WSW of Newcastle; 5 km (3.1 mi) WNW of Charlestown; 35 km (22 mi) SE of Maitland; 54 km (34 mi) NNE of The Entrance; 145 km (90 mi) NNE of Sydney

Government
  - State electorate: Lake Macquarie
  - Federal division: Shortland

Area
  - Total: 1.6 km^{2} (0.62 sq mi)
- Elevation: 42 m (138 ft)

Population
  - Total: 2,931 (2021 census)
  - Density: 1,830/km^{2} (4,740/sq mi)
- Postcode: 2285
- Parish: Kahibah
Suburbs around Cardiff South
| Cardiff | Cardiff | Cardiff |
| Macquarie Hills | Cardiff South | Cardiff |
| Lakelands | Warners Bay | Hillsborough |

Cardiff South is a suburb of the City of Lake Macquarie, New South Wales, Australia, located 13 kilometres (8 mi) west-southwest of Newcastle's central business district. It is part of the City of Lake Macquarie north ward.

Cardiff South was originally composed of three separate suburbs: Cardiff South, Evelien, and Coalbrook.

Its soccer team, the South Cardiff FC play in the National Premier Leagues, the top soccer competition in Newcastle.
