= Argenton, New South Wales =

Argenton Greater Newcastle, New South Wales
- Coordinates: 32°55′55″S 151°37′05″E
- Population: 1,352 (2021 census)
  - Density: 845/km^{2} (2,190/sq mi)
- Established: 1838
- Postcode(s): 2284
- Area: 1.6 km^{2} (0.6 sq mi)
- Location: 16 km (10 mi) W of Newcastle
- LGA(s): City of Lake Macquarie
- Parish: Kahibah
- State electorate(s): Lake Macquarie
- Federal division(s): Shortland
Suburbs around Argenton:
Edgeworth	Edgeworth	Glendale
Teralba	Argenton	Glendale
Teralba	Boolaroo	Cardiff

Argenton is a suburb of the city of Lake Macquarie, Greater Newcastle in New South Wales, Australia 16 kilometres (10 mi) west of the Newcastle's central business district in Lake Macquarie's West Ward.

== History ==
The Awabakal people are the first people of the area.

Lead smelting commenced in the area in 1898. A public school opened in 1897, but was closed six years later. Another school opened in 1953. The Newcastle Mines Rescue Station opened in 1927. The Waratah Golf Club was formed in 1901 and is the oldest golf club in Newcastle. The Cockle Creek Smelter was confirmed to begin disassembly in 2005 for the cost of approx $6 mil. In 2009 it was nearing the end of demolition with clearing and replanting of land.

== Population ==
In the 2021 Census, the population of Argenton was 1,352. 85.7% of people were born in Australia and 87.4% of people only spoke English at home. The most common responses for religion were No Religion 41.5%, Catholic 18.6% and Anglican 16.1%.

In the 2016 Census, the population of Argenton was 1,351. 86.6% of people were born in Australia and 88.1% of people only spoke English at home. The most common responses for religion were No Religion 27.6%, Anglican 21.7% and Catholic 20.6%.

== Local interests ==
Argenton is a small suburb of Lake Macquarie commonly recognised for its BMX Club, Soccer Club and longstanding Bakery which under initial ownership claimed to have the best meat pie in Australia. With the opening of Glendale Supercentre within the boundaries of Argenton, the area has seen rapid growth in visitors travelling through the suburb. The demolition of the Cockle Creek Smelter saw 360 people losing their employment although it caused much pollution to the surrounding areas. Much controversy surrounded the smelter and many saw both positive and negative factors in its closing.
