= Boolaroo Racecourse =

Former racecourse in New South Wales, Australia

Coordinates: 32°57′30″S 151°37′30″E

- Location: Boolaroo, New South Wales
- Course type: Flat

Boolaroo Racecourse is a former racecourse, near the suburb of Boolaroo, New South Wales, Australia, it was served by a station and siding on the then Main North Line. The area is now an industrial estate. The racecourse was located to the west of Cockle Creek with its western and northern boundary being the original Sydney to Newcastle rail line (1889). The station was closed on 14 May 1942 and removed. The new line (1957) was constructed nearly 30 years after the demise of the racecourse.

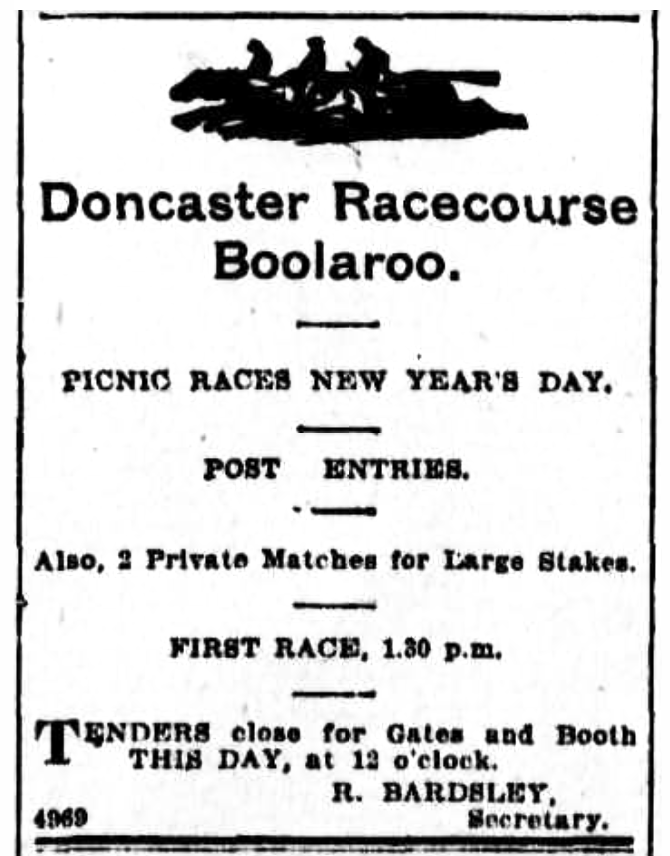
Promoting New Year's Day 1902 Race Meeting

The racecourse had a difficult start in the 1890s with a scarcity of race days for the Boolaroo calendar. With the Sulphide Corporation, from 1898, becoming an important place of employment things were looking up for Boolaroo and the adjacent suburbs. The advertisement for a New Year’s day 1902 meeting at the Doncaster Racecourse Boolaroo was a strong indication of the racecourse as a participant in the sport in the Lower Hunter region.Things look to have been tough in the early years of the 20th century and the Maitland Daily Mercury reported on 23 Sep. 1908 that the “Boolaroo racecourse, at Cockle Creek, changed hands to-day, for a large sum.” Racecourse Purchased by a Syndicate. The new owners were planning “to immediately make the property one of the best equipped courses in the State.” . . . "Mr. Lou Solomon, secretary of (Newcastle) Tattersalls Club, will have the management of the new venture, in the capacity of secretary to the syndicate." The paper also noted: "There was a station and a siding near the south-western corner of the racecourse paddock. The location of the railway made the track attractive to owners and punters from Sydney to enjoy their sport at Boolaroo."

A number of aircraft used the racecourse as an emergency landing site, including the aircraft Southern Cross flown by Charles Kingsford Smith in 1927.
