= Barnsley, New South Wales =

Barnsley Greater Newcastle, New South Wales
- Coordinates: 32°55′55″S 151°35′06″E
- Population: 1,735 (2021 census)
  - Density: 789/km^{2} (2,040/sq mi)
- Postcode(s): 2278
- Area: 2.2 km^{2} (0.8 sq mi)
- Location: 21 km (13 mi) W of Newcastle
- LGA(s): City of Lake Macquarie
- Parish: Teralba
- State electorate(s): Cessnock
- Federal division(s): Hunter
Suburbs around Barnsley:
Holmesville	Holmesville	Cameron Park
Killingworth	Barnsley	Edgeworth
Killingworth	Teralba	Teralba

Barnsley is a township in New South Wales, Australia, 21 kilometres (13 mi) west of Newcastle's central business district. It is a suburb of the City of Lake Macquarie local government area.

In 2021, the population of Barnsley was 1735 individual people, and the average age of the residents living there is 34–36 years.

== History ==
The Awabakal people (the indigenous Australians of the area) were the first people of this land.

The area was first settled by Europeans in 1829. Originally, the district was called 'Teralba,' but its name changed to 'Barnsley' when the school opened in 1865. The town took its name from Barnsley, South Yorkshire.

Early on in its development, orchards, vegetable farms, and dairy farms were Barnsley's main industries. All travel was either on foot or on horseback until cars were invented.

Being a small hamlet at the beginning of the 20th century, many services and facilities did not exist. The first post office in Barnsley was opened on 1 July 1907 while water supply was constructed in 1949.

== Education ==
Barnsley contains a public primary school as well as a preschool and a childcare center.
