= Seahampton =

- Suburb
- Coordinates: 32°55′26″S 151°35′06″E
- Country: Australia
- State: New South Wales
- City: Greater Newcastle
- LGAs: City of Lake Macquarie; City of Maitland
- Location: 21 km (13 mi) W of Newcastle; 23 km (14 mi) SSE of Maitland

Government
  - State electorate: Cessnock
  - Federal division: Hunter

Area
  - Total: 0.5 km^{2} (0.19 sq mi)

Population
  - Total: 311 (2011 census)
  - Density: 620/km^{2} (1,610/sq mi)
- Postcode: 2286
- Parish: Teralba
Suburbs around Seahampton
Richmond Vale	Stockrington	Minmi
Richmond Vale	Seahampton	Minmi
West Wallsend		Cameron Park

Seahampton is a hamlet situated north of West Wallsend, New South Wales, Australia, located 21 kilometres (13 mi) west of the city of Newcastle's central business district and west of the Sydney-Newcastle Freeway. It is a suburb of the City of Lake Macquarie local government area.

Seaham No.1 Colliery in 1900.

Seahampton's origins are in coal mining. Seaham No. 1 Colliery was opened here on 6 March 1890 by the Monkwearmouth Coal Company which was reformed and renamed the Seaham Coal Company Ltd., in 1896. The shaft was 460 feet (140 m) deep and serviced the Borehole seam which here was about five feet nine inches thick.

Its peak production was 1,450 tons per day and the coal was shipped via the company's private railway to the New South Wales Government line at Cockle Creek Junction. The colliery closed on 7 July 1932, during the Great Depression, and never re-opened.

The township of Seahampton was surveyed in 1889 to provide homesites for colliery employees.

== History ==
The Aboriginal people, in this area, the Awabakal, were the first people of this land.
