= Macquarie Hills =

- Suburb
- Coordinates: 32.952701568°S 151.649795532°E
- Country: Australia
- State: New South Wales
- City: Greater Newcastle
- LGA: City of Lake Macquarie
- Location: 15 km (9.3 mi) W of Newcastle; 7 km (4.3 mi) WNW of Charlestown

Government
  - State electorate: Lake Macquarie
  - Federal division: Shortland

Area
  - Total: 2.5 km^{2} (0.97 sq mi)

Population
  - Total: 3,605 (2021 census)
  - Density: 1,442/km^{2} (3,730/sq mi)
- Postcode: 2285
- Parish: Kahibah
Suburbs around Macquarie Hills
Boolaroo	Cardiff	Cardiff
Boolaroo	Macquarie Hills	Cardiff South
Speers Point	Warners Bay	Lakelands

Macquarie Hills is a residential suburb of the City of Lake Macquarie, New South Wales, Australia, located 15 kilometres (9 mi) west of Newcastle's central business district near the northern end of Lake Macquarie. It is part of the City of Lake Macquarie north ward.

== History ==
The first people of this land were the Awabakal whose territory included Macquarie Hills. The Awabakal tribe were hunters and gatherers who would keep moving in order to prevent exhausting their supplies, camping at various sites for days and sometimes weeks. The elevated terrain of Munibung Hill, which borders the suburb, is recognised as a place of cultural and resource significance for the Awabakal community.

=== Early land grants and ownership ===
In 1833, the area formed part of a 2,560‑acre land grant issued to Joseph Weller. The land was later acquired by the Newcastle Wallsend Coal Company, which became a major landholder throughout the district.

=== Subdivision and early transport routes ===
The Newcastle Wallsend Coal Company initiated the “Macquarie Subdivision” in 1889, marking the first formal attempts to develop the area. At this time, a rough bush track known as Government Road linked Cardiff and Warners Bay. Portions of this track were renamed Macquarie Road as part of the subdivision process.

Further extensions to the subdivision occurred in 1919 and 1922, connecting Macquarie Road with newly formed streets such as Lawson Road and Blaxland Road, supporting gradual residential and commercial expansion.

=== Naming and identity ===
The name Macquarie Hills is derived from the early Macquarie subdivision and reflects the suburb’s proximity to Munibung Hill, a prominent local landmark. Prior to its formal recognition, the area was considered part of Cardiff.

=== Residential development ===
Significant suburban growth began in the late 1960s as developers, including Milne Browne & Co. and the Herald Finance Company, established new residential estates across the area. These developments transformed the landscape from semi‑rural holdings into a modern residential suburb. There is a theme of U.S. names in these Macquarie Hills streets.

In the 1990's and 2000's Macquarie Hills residential development expanded further to the west and south.

=== Establishment as a suburb ===
Originally part of the suburb of Cardiff, the boundaries of the new suburb were defined in 1991, and the status of suburb was given in 2001.
