= Holmesville, New South Wales =

Holmesville
- Suburb
- Coordinates: 32°54′54″S 151°34′05″E
- Country: Australia
- State: New South Wales
- City: Greater Newcastle
- LGA: City of Lake Macquarie
- Location: 21 km (13 mi) W of Newcastle
- Established: 1895

Government
  - State electorate: Cessnock
  - Federal division: Hunter

Area
  - Total: 1.9 km^{2} (0.73 sq mi)

Population
  - Total: 1,413 (2021 census)
  - Density: 744/km^{2} (1,930/sq mi)
- Postcode: 2286
- Parish: Teralba
Suburbs around Holmesville
West Wallsend	West Wallsend	Cameron Park
Killingworth	Holmesville	Edgeworth
Killingworth	Killingworth	Barnsley

Holmesville is a suburb of Newcastle, New South Wales, Australia, 21 kilometres (13 mi) from Newcastle's central business district and close to the Sydney-Newcastle Freeway. It is part of the City of Lake Macquarie local government area.

Holmesville is the home town of Miss Universe 2004, Jennifer Hawkins.

== History ==
The local Aboriginal people, the Awabakal, were the first people of this land.
