= Cardiff, New South Wales =

Cardiff
- Suburb
- Coordinates: 32°55′55″S 151°39′04″E
- Country: Australia
- State: New South Wales
- LGA: Lake Macquarie
- Location: 17 km (11 mi) WSW of Newcastle; 147 km (91 mi) NNE of Sydney

Government
  - State electorates: Lake Macquarie; Wallsend; Charlestown
  - Federal division: Shortland

Area
  - Total: 8.3 km^{2} (3.2 sq mi)
- Elevation: 19 m (62 ft)

Population
  - Total: 6,318 (2021 census)
  - Density: 761/km^{2} (1,972/sq mi)
- Postcode: 2285
- Parish: Kahibah
Suburbs around Cardiff
Argenton	Glendale	Cardiff Heights
Boolaroo	Cardiff	Garden Suburb
Macquarie Hills	Cardiff South	Hillsborough

Cardiff is a suburb in the Lake Macquarie LGA of New South Wales, Australia.

It is located 17 kilometres (11 mi) west-southwest of Newcastle.

== History ==
The first people of this land were the Awabakal whose territory included Cardiff. The Awabakal tribe were hunters and gatherers who would keep moving in order to prevent exhausting their supplies, camping at various sites for days and sometimes weeks.

Cardiff's history is defined by coal mining, orchards and the construction of the Sydney to Newcastle railway.

Originally known as Winding Creek after the stream which wound its way from south-east to north-west across the central valley of the area, the area then became known as Lymington after one of the mines in the area. The name Lymington kept being confused with Flemington by postal authorities, so another name change was recommended. There were a number of Welsh settlers living in the area, and on the suggestion of one of them, James Edwards, the name Cardiff was chosen after the capital of Wales. It was officially adopted in 1889.

=== Early Settlers ===
The first land grant was a parcel of 2,560 acres (10.4 km^{2}) to Joseph Weller in 1833, stretching west of the current Macquarie Road to Argenton and Cockle Creek. This grant was later transferred to the Wallsend Coal Company.

Other selections were taken up from 1862 to the east of the Weller grant.

=== Coal Mines ===
In the latter part of the 19th century coal mining, became prevalent in the area. Lymington (1882) and South Wallsend (1884, later renamed Cardiff) collieries both started production in the vicinity of the current Cardiff South. During the Depression of the 1930s 8 small pits operated: Tickhole, Austral, Rosebank, Ajax, Jubilee, Rising Sun, Hillside and the old Myall Extended, which was reopened. An opencut operated during World War II and closed in 1947.

=== Railway Line ===
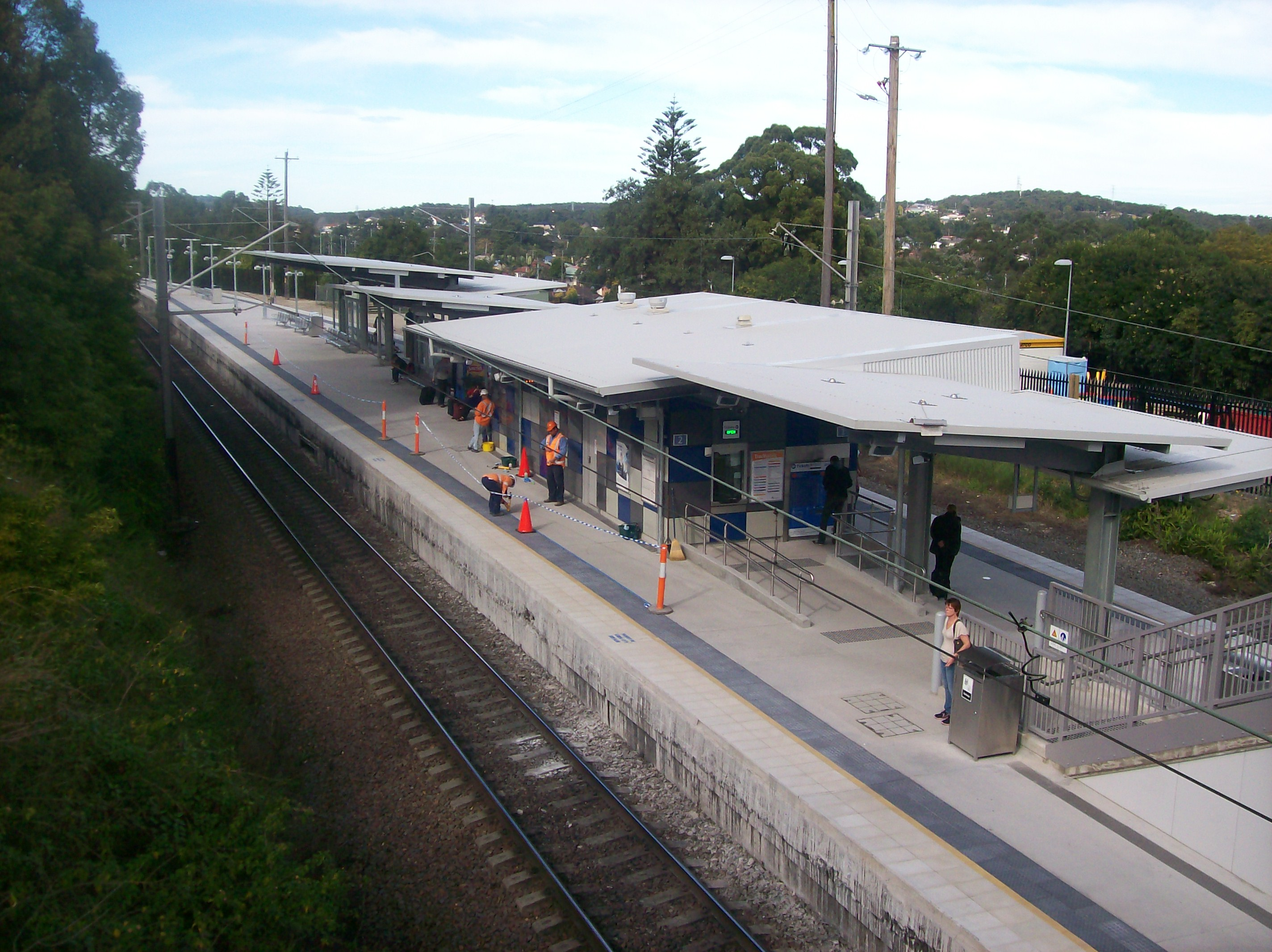
Cardiff railway station

Construction of the railway began in 1883, which led to a navvies camp being established at Winding Creek in 1883 with the rail line completed in 1887. The first Cardiff railway station, known as Winding Creek, was opened in 1888 and renamed Cardiff a year later.

The original line which ran through the present day RSL car park, Cardiff Toyota and along Myall Road was found to be too steep for the trains of the period, and the line was realigned to the current alignment completed in June 1902. A new station was built on the deviation in 1904 and is currently a key stop on the Central Coast & Newcastle Line.

=== Other ===
Lake Macquarie Shire Council had its offices in Cardiff from 1906 until 1915.

Originally part of Cardiff, the boundaries of Macquarie Hills were defined on 31 May 1991 by the Geographical Names Board. The status of suburb was assigned to Macquarie Hills on 10 August 2001.

== Places of Interest ==
=== Winding Creek ===
Winding Creek has always been a prominent feature, with the town of Cardiff straddling its banks. It is one of the main tributaries of Cockle Creek, which flows into Lake Macquarie and during significant rain events floods the Central Business District, most notably during the 2007 Pasha Bulker ECL. In 1972 the section between Elizabeth Street and the rail line was concreted, in 2024 a 300m section was reconstructed by Hunter Water for a more natural look, south of Myall Road.

=== War Memorial ===
Established in 1921, the memorial has two First World War dedication plaques. The plaques were originally located at the gates of Cardiff cricket ground, but was re-erected in 1971 at the corner of Macquarie Road and Myall Road due to road-widening. It was re-dedicated in 1975 by Tom Uren.

The memorial was then moved again to the Cardiff RSL Club in 2001. In 2013, the memorial was re-designed to include a cenotaph and two headstones alongside the original First World War plaques.

=== Harry Ford Reserve ===
Named after Harry Ford Snr, a Cardiff businessman and property owner. It was a 2000-square-metre park located on the corner of Main Road and Macquarie Road. Harry Ford Memorial Park and fountain was opened by P.D Hills MLA on 2nd August 1973.The fountain was infamous for instances when detergent was added to it and it became the foamy fountain, often encroaching onto nearby roads.

Lake Macquarie City Council sold the parkland to Woolworths in 2009, who demolished the fountain and park facilities to develop a new shopping centre on the land, committing to acquiring land nearby to develop a new community park. Four sites were identified, but years later, the park has not been replaced.

=== Merrions Bakery ===
Merrions Bakery was a long‑standing family‑run bakery in Cardiff, New South Wales, and became a well‑known local institution over several decades.

The bakery was established in 1922 by Herbert Merrion, who had completed his apprenticeship at the Arnott’s Biscuit factory in Newcastle. The original shop operated on the corner of Harrison Street and Main Road, Cardiff, before later relocating across the road in Harrison Street. Merrion, who had four sons and two daughters, operated the business until his death in 1959, after which his sons continued to run the bakery.

Merrions Bakery remained a prominent fixture in the suburb until the late 1970s, when the business was acquired by Tip Top Bakeries.

=== Cardiff Railway Workshops ===
The Cardiff Railway Workshops were established in 1928 following the relocation of the New South Wales Government Railways facilities from Honeysuckle Station, Newcastle, to a new site near Cardiff, New South Wales.

During the Second World War, the workshops contributed to the war effort by producing tools and dies for the manufacture of shell casings and other munitions components. In addition to wartime production, the site undertook repairs to rolling stock and constructed locomotives. Steam locomotive maintenance continued until 1970, when the last steam boiler was overhauled, marking the transition to diesel traction.

Employment at the workshops peaked at 1,915 workers in 1947 but declined to around 600 by the 1970s. The facility’s role as a major maintenance centre ended in December 1993, when the last locomotives departed. The workshops were officially closed on 7 January 1994.

Following closure, the sheds were repurposed for other railway projects. Between 1994 and 1998, the site was used for fitting radios to locomotives. In June 1998, Downer Rail secured a contract to construct 140 electric suburban carriages, later known as the Millennium Trains, at the Cardiff facility.

=== Hunter Brewery ===
Tooheys Brewery (Hunter Brewery) built in Cardiff, Newcastle, NSW opened in 1971, a significant part of the Tooheys brand's expansion and production for the NSW market with the brewery closed in 1987.

== Education ==
The first Public School opened in July 1891 in a Methodist Church rented by the Education Department. A more permanent building was provided in 1897 on land purchased from the Wallsend Coal Company where Cardiff Public school is presently located.

- Cardiff High School is a co-ed government high school established in 1962, located on Boronia Street.
- Cardiff Public School is a co-ed government primary school established in 1891, located on Macquarie Road.
- Cardiff North Public School is a co-ed government primary school established in 1956, located on Wansbeck Valley Road.
- St Kevin's Primary School is a co-ed catholic primary school established in 1917, located on Main Road.

== Sports ==
Cardiff has played an important part in the sporting history of the Hunter Region, home to many sports and clubs.

=== Soccer ===
Cardiff Soccer Football club, known as the Tangerine Tigers, were the first sporting team to represent the area. The Tigers competed at the highest level in NNSW until their demise in 1993.

The Tigers played at Cardiff Recreation ground, later named Cardiff Park, from 1926 to 1977, before a move to Lymington Park in 1978 until 1993.

Cardiff City Tigers were established in 1997 and currently represent the suburb, competing in the Zone Football League Division 1.

=== Cricket ===
Cardiff Boolaroo District Cricket Club (commonly referred to as CBs) was originally established as Western Lakes and made its debut in the 1949–50 season, playing out of Speers Point. Shortly afterwards, the club changed its name to Boolaroo Cardiff, and later to Cardiff Boolaroo following its relocation to the Cardiff Ovals.

In the 2019–20 season, the club moved to new facilities at the Pasterfield Sports Complex in Cameron Park.

The CBs are currently playing in the Newcastle District Cricket Association.

=== Rugby League ===
Although Cardiff had fielded Rugby League teams as early as 1911, the modern Cardiff Rugby Football League Club was formally established on 12 February 1930. The foundation meeting was attended by A. H. Geikhe, D. Smith, C. Williams and Mr. Clarke, with the latter hosting the gathering at his residence. At this meeting the club resolved to enter a team in the Newcastle Rugby League third grade competition, as well as an under‑20s side.

The club known as Cardiff Cobras currently plays at Cardiff Oval No1 competing in the NHRL Men's A Grade and Women's Community Plate.

=== Australian Rules ===
Cardiff Hawks Australian Football Club was established on 14 November 1967 at a meeting held at the Evans Park Soccer Hall by former pupils of Cardiff High School. The club entered a team in the Newcastle Australian Football League (NAFL) Reserve Grade competition in 1968. After securing the Reserve Grade premiership in 1969, Cardiff was admitted to the league’s First Grade competition and have won eight First Grade premierships.

The Hawks currently compete in the Black Diamond Australian Football League after the merge of the Newcastle and Central Coast leagues.

=== Squash ===
Established in 1972 and opened by Prime Minister Sir Billy McMahon, Cardiff Squash Centre is one of Australia's oldest, continuously operating venues. Cardiff Squash Centre is the only private squash facility in the Hunter region with 8 newly renovated courts with international grade lighting.

== Retail ==
Cardiff has a small shopping centre, as well as numerous small specialty stores. There are two supermarkets Woolworths and Aldi.

The Cardiff Shopping Centre features a liquor store, newsagency, bakery, sushi cafe, hairdresser, and travel agency

== Hotels and Clubs ==
=== Cardiff Workers Club/Club Nova Panthers/Wests Cardiff ===
Cardiff Workers' Club origins began with miners seeking a post-work social spot. In 1947, miners found a site in Pendlebury Road, Cardiff, starting with just a keg on a tree stump, known informally as "The Black Stump". The popularity of "The Black Stump" led to efforts to form a registered club, culminating in the Cardiff District Workers' Club receiving its license on 14 May 1957. The club was a popular dance spot and a vital part of the community. Cardiff Workers Club hosted many big acts including Chuck Berry, Cold Chisel, INXS, Little River Band.

On 15 July 2001 the Club Nova amalgamation was approved by the members and in 2002 Panthers amalgamated with Club Nova Newcastle & Cardiff. The clubs were then known as Club Nova Panthers Newcastle & Cardiff respectfully, until 29 September 2003 when the club's names were changed to Newcastle & Cardiff Panthers. The Wests Group took over the struggling Cardiff Panthers club in 2013, securing its poker machines and land to relieve Panthers' debt, integrating it as another Wests venue.

=== Cardiff RSL ===
The club traces its origins to the formation of the Cardiff RSL sub‑branch in 1933, established to support local veterans and their families. The development of the club’s premises began in the years following the Second World War. In 1947 the sub‑branch purchased building structures from Fern Bay/Stockton, including former army huts, which were transported to Cardiff and adapted to create the organisation’s first dedicated clubhouse.

=== Cardiff Bowling Club ===
On 21 September 1951, a meeting was held at the Royal Hotel, Cardiff between the Amenities Committee and members of the Cardiff Chamber of Commerce. It was agreed that the Chamber would take the lead in forming a bowling club. A public meeting to form the Cardiff Bowling Club was held on 17 December 1951 at the Star Theatre and construction began with foundational piers set on 9 May 1953. The first matches on the new green were held on 10 May 1953.

=== Royal Hotel/Iron Horse Inn ===
The Royal Hotel was built early in the 20th century and later renamed the Iron Horse Inn.

== Industrial Estate ==
Cardiff Industrial Estate is located in Cardiff’s west, a major light Industrial area of the Hunter Region that was established in the 1970s and expanded on in the 1990s.

In 2021 Munibung Road was extended through the redeveloped former Pasminco Sulphide site, providing a connection between Cardiff and Boolaroo.

== Population statistics ==
- 1891: 200 persons.
- 1911: 145 homes and 667 persons.
- 1921: 313 homes and 1522 persons. Including Cardiff Heights.
- 1933: 881 homes and 3843 persons. Including Cardiff Heights.
- 1947: 1160 homes and 4755 persons. Including Cardiff Heights.

Census year		2001	2006	2011	2016	2021
Population		5,039	5,796	5,779	5,830	6,318
Median Age		-	37	37	37	38
Aboriginal or Torres Strait Islander		1.8%	2.7%	4%	4%	5.7%
Country of Birth	Australia	84.8%	86.8%	86.3%	86%	86%
	England	2.4%	1.7%	1.6%	1.7%	2.1%
	New Zealand	0.9%	0.9%	1%	1.3%	1.1%
Religious affiliation	No Religion	11%	15.7%	21.7%	32.5%	44%
	Catholic	26.1%	25.3%	24.6%	20.7%	17.3%
	Anglican	28.1%	25.9%	24.1%	20.1%	15.1%
Median monthly mortgage repayments		-	$1,300	$1,673	$1,777	$1,733
Median weekly rent		-	$200	$320	$335	
