= Lakelands, New South Wales =

Lakelands New South Wales
- Coordinates: 32°57′40″S 151°39′00″E
- Population: 1,445 (2021 census)
  - Density: 1,810/km^{2} (4,680/sq mi)
- Postcode(s): 2282
- Area: 0.8 km^{2} (0.3 sq mi)
- Location: 16 km (10 mi) SW of Newcastle; 6 km (4 mi) W of Charlestown
- LGA(s): City of Lake Macquarie
- Parish: Kahibah
- State electorate(s): Lake Macquarie
- Federal division(s): Shortland
Suburbs around Lakelands:
Macquarie Hills	Macquarie Hills	Cardiff South
Warners Bay	Lakelands	Warners Bay
	Warners Bay

Lakelands is a residential suburb of the City of Lake Macquarie, New South Wales, Australia 16 kilometres (10 mi) south-west of Newcastle's central business district near the northern end of Lake Macquarie. It is part of the City of Lake Macquarie west ward, and was formerly part of Warners Bay.

== History ==
Along Ambleside Circuit, the suburb's main street, is "Lakelands Business Centre". There is a variety of small businesses including a cafe, barber and psychiatrist. There is a tennis court, playground and also a cricket field in the south of Lakelands.

In 2015, Lakelands was expanded into a former bush area, adding a residential area to the west of the suburb, bordering Warners Bay.
