= Speers Point =

- Suburb
- Coordinates: 32°57′48″S 151°37′40″E
- Country: Australia
- State: New South Wales
- Region: Hunter
- City: Greater Newcastle
- LGA: City of Lake Macquarie
- Location: 143 km (89 mi) N of Sydney; 17.6 km (10.9 mi) WSW of Newcastle
- Established: 1870

Government
  - State electorate: Lake Macquarie
  - Federal division: Shortland

Area
  - Total: 3.2 km^{2} (1.2 sq mi)

Population
  - Total: 3,400 (2021 census)
  - Density: 1,060/km^{2} (2,750/sq mi)
- Postcode: 2284
- County: Northumberland
- Parish: Kahibah
Suburbs around Speers Point
Teralba	Boolaroo	Macquarie Hills
Teralba	Speers Point	Warners Bay
Lake Macquarie	Lake Macquarie	Warners Bay

Speers Point is a suburb of Greater Newcastle, and the location of the council seat of the City of Lake Macquarie local government area in New South Wales, Australia. It is 17 kilometres (10.6 mi) west-southwest of the city of Newcastle on the northern shore of Lake Macquarie, in Cockle and Warners Bays, between the suburbs of Cardiff and Warners Bay.

Speers Point was settled in 1828 and local commerce began through a colliery in 1843. By 2006, the suburb had a population of 3,230.

There has been a proposal to rename part of the suburb to 'Lake Macquarie', to reflect the name of the city.

== History ==
Before European settlement, the Awabakal people of Lake Macquarie had inhabited the area and called it Biddaba or Milloba.

The first claimant to the land was a settler named William Brooks, who selected the area now called Kahibah Parish in 1828, named his property Lochend and received deeds in 1839. The title deeds covered the area east of Cockle Creek, Boolaroo and the place now known as Speers Point. However, before Brooks' claim the land had been occupied by R. Sadleir, who did not make a claim to the land. Brooks developed his claim and opened the Lochend Colliery in 1843, which mined coal from the bottom of the hills around Speers Point.

In 1870, William Speer, a wealthy businessman from Sydney, settled there and obtained some of Brooks' land. Speer's residence was erected opposite the current Council Administration Centre. William Brooks' name of Lochend was forgotten and Speer's name remained as Speers Point, referring to the peninsula of land into Lake Macquarie that part of the area is located on.

In 1887, a 'Mr Ryan' was the only resident of the area. Ryan was Speer's estate administrator. However, Speers Point began to become more populated when its first subdivision occurred in 1902. Further subdivisions occurred and industry began to open up, and Speers Point Park was transferred to the Lake Macquarie council in 1910. In 1912, a steam tram line began service, whilst the Lake Macquarie council offices moved to Speers Point in 1915 (and moved again in 1955). In 1916 the first post office was opened along with another mine.

In 1920, a rowing boat (later hire boat and ferry) service operated across Cockle Creek, however a footbridge was constructed in 1928. In 1930 the steam tram service ceased operations, but was replaced by a private bus service in 1931. Two routes were opened by the government in 1937, whilst an industrial port bus service began operation in 1938. Sewerage systems were put in place in 1945, and two public schools opened in January 1957 and January 1959.

The first winner of the Sydney to Hobart Yacht Race in 1945, a cutter called Rani was built by the Steel brothers of Lake Macquarie. Being the second smallest of the nine competing, it was 'given up as lost' by the organisers.

The post office closed in 1976 and the 1989 Newcastle earthquake brought substantial damage to the town, especially to the Boolaroo-Speers Point RSL club and its youth section. The epicentre of the magnitude 5.6 earthquake was the neighbouring suburb of Boolaroo.

== Geography ==
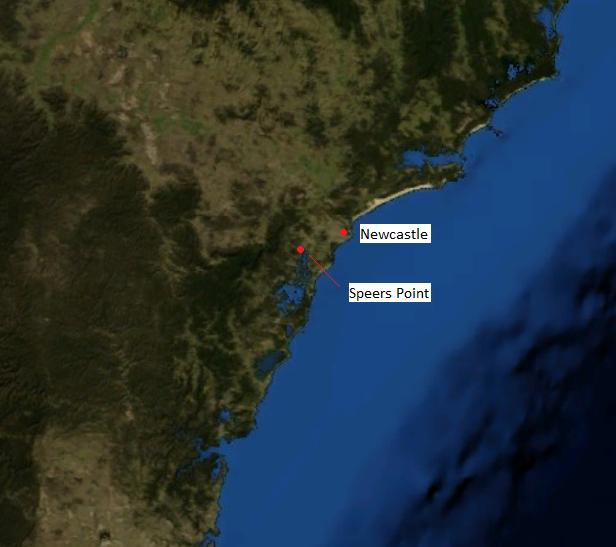
Speers Point in relation to Newcastle

Speers Point is located approximately 17 kilometres (10.6 mi) WSW of Newcastle, New South Wales and 143 kilometres (88.9 mi) north-east of Sydney, within the City of Lake Macquarie at 32°57′54″S 151°37′05″E. The boundaries of Speers Point are generally Cockle Creek to the west, Seventh Street to the north, Fairfax Road to the east and Lake Macquarie to the south.

The elevation of Speers Point is approximately 27 metres above sea level.

=== Climate ===
Speers Point features a humid subtropical climate (Köppen: Cfa) with very warm, rainy summers and mild, drier winters with cool nights. Extremes have ranged from 45.2 °C (113.4 °F) on 18 January 2013 to −3.4 °C (25.9 °F) on 16 July 2018. Climatic data is available for the nearby Cooranbong.

Climate data for Cooranbong (33º05'S, 151º28'E, 6 AMSL) (2008-2024 normals and extremes)
Month	Jan	Feb	Mar	Apr	May	Jun	Jul	Aug	Sep	Oct	Nov	Dec	Year
Record high °C (°F)	45.2 (113.4)	42.5 (108.5)	38.8 (101.8)	34.6 (94.3)	29.0 (84.2)	25.4 (77.7)	25.6 (78.1)	29.3 (84.7)	34.8 (94.6)	37.1 (98.8)	41.2 (106.2)	43.0 (109.4)	45.2 (113.4)
Mean daily maximum °C (°F)	28.8 (83.8)	28.0 (82.4)	26.8 (80.2)	24.3 (75.7)	21.3 (70.3)	18.5 (65.3)	18.7 (65.7)	19.9 (67.8)	22.7 (72.9)	24.3 (75.7)	25.9 (78.6)	27.4 (81.3)	23.9 (75.0)
Mean daily minimum °C (°F)	18.0 (64.4)	17.4 (63.3)	16.0 (60.8)	12.0 (53.6)	7.9 (46.2)	6.6 (43.9)	5.0 (41.0)	5.1 (41.2)	8.0 (46.4)	11.0 (51.8)	14.0 (57.2)	16.0 (60.8)	11.4 (52.5)
Record low °C (°F)	8.8 (47.8)	10.0 (50.0)	7.1 (44.8)	4.2 (39.6)	−0.8 (30.6)	−2.8 (27.0)	−3.4 (25.9)	−2.1 (28.2)	0.6 (33.1)	3.0 (37.4)	5.7 (42.3)	7.5 (45.5)	−3.4 (25.9)
Average precipitation mm (inches)	109.6 (4.31)	138.4 (5.45)	157.5 (6.20)	93.9 (3.70)	47.5 (1.87)	94.5 (3.72)	71.7 (2.82)	48.7 (1.92)	57.4 (2.26)	89.8 (3.54)	103.6 (4.08)	88.2 (3.47)	1,104.4 (43.48)
Average precipitation days (≥ 1.0 mm)	8.4	10.1	10.6	9.2	6.3	8.7	6.3	4.6	6.1	8.6	8.1	9.1	96.1
Source: Bureau of Meteorology (2008-2024 normals and extremes)

== Economy ==
Early industry in Speers Point included the Lochend Colliery from 1843 where coal was mined until 1916, when the Speers Point Gully mine was opened by T.D.H. Rhodes. Soon after settlement by William Speer, a dairy began operating and before 1874 a citrus orchard was in operation by the lakeside.

The nearby Cockle Creek Smelter operated from 1896, however operations ceased on 12 September 2003. Since the departure of the mining industry Speers Point has not housed any major businesses.

== Facilities ==
The Lake Macquarie area in general receives the same media outlets as nearby Newcastle. However, the Lake Macquarie News is a local newspaper owned by the News Limited community newspaper circle.

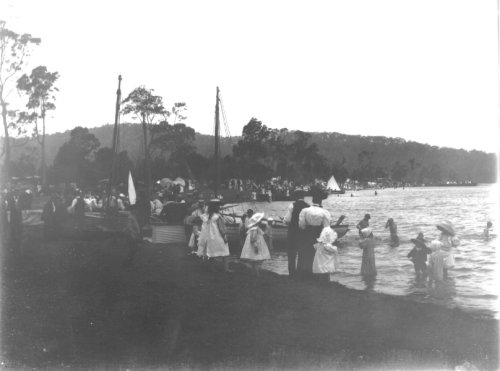
Recreation on the Speers Point foreshore (1904)

Despite its small size, Speers Point is home to many sports clubs, many of which may be considered 'niche markets', such as the Speers Point Amateur Sailing Club, a major social ground for many residents. This organisation was founded on Lake Macquarie in the early 1900s and is currently situated at Speers Point Park. Speers Point is also home to a swim centre.

Opposite the Speers Point swim centre is Speers Point Park, which boasts a stage area, playgrounds, barbecue facilities and lighting. The park is dog friendly.

Speers Point also gives its name to a RSL sub-branch in nearby Boolaroo. A bowls club is located near there.

There is no hospital in Speers Point but in the nearby suburb of Warners Bay there is one private hospital (Warners Bay Private Hospital).

The logo of Speers Point Public School

Speers Point has one public school, Speers Point Public School, located on Bell Street. It has enrolment figures of 170, with years K-6 attending. The school was founded in 1957 and currently features an outdoor playground, undercover areas, sports facilities, computer labs and resources.

Only one high school serves the 2284 postcode area, Lake Macquarie High School, located in nearby Booragul. An independent school is located in nearby Booragul called St Pauls High School.

== Demographics ==
At the ABS 2011 census, Speers Point had a population of 3,230, an increase of 127 people from the 2006 census and 193 from the 2001 census.

Speers Point residents had a median age of 44 years, compared to the northern Lake Macquarie regional average of 38 years, and the New South Wales and Australian median of 37 years. The median individual income was below average for the region—$408 per week compared with $432 per week across northern Lake Macquarie and $461 a week in New South Wales. The 2006 Census figures put Speers Point's unemployment rate at 1.6% below the Newcastle average.

Females make up 50.7% of the 3103 residents of Speers Point (a total of 1573), whilst males, at 1530, make up only 49.3%. This differs from the national Australian average of 50.6% females and 49.4% males.

The population of Speers Point is predominantly Australian-born, with some 84.8% of its residents as at the 2006 census. The second most prevalent birthplace was the United Kingdom at 3.90%. 2.00% reported one or more parents of Italian birth. At the 2006 census, 1.42% of residents identified as Indigenous Australians.

The most popular religious affiliations in descending order in the 2006 census were Anglican, Roman Catholic, no religion and Uniting. The All Saints Anglican Church, Our Lady Help of Christians Catholic Church and Boolaroo Uniting Church are all located on Main Road in or near the suburb's northern boundary.

== Transport ==
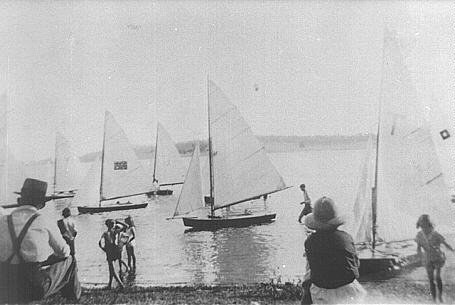
Speers Point and the Lake Macquarie area has historically been frequented by water crafts.

Cars are the preferred mode of transport in the suburb. At the 2001 census, the Australian Bureau of Statistics reported that 74.96% of Speers Point's residents were drivers or passengers of cars in their commute to work, a figure significantly higher than the regional average of 71.87%. Other private modes of transport included motorcycling (0.48%), cycling (0.72%) and walking (1.86%). A state bike path runs close to the suburb (Newcastle 39).

At the 2001 census, 4.12% of Speers Point residents used public transport to get to work, compared with 2.72% regionally. The suburb is served by the 363 bus route (Monday-Saturday) between Belmont/Warners Bay and Newcastle's central business district, provided by Newcastle Buses & Ferries. The bus also connects with the Main North railway line at Cockle Creek railway station approximately 2.5 kilometres (1.6 mi) to the north of the suburb, and a major regional shopping centre, Stockland Glendale.

Early transport included steam trams (beginning in 1912 and closing 1930), a rowing boat ferry service operated by Harry Linsley across Cockle Creek in 1920 (a footbridge was built in 1928) and government bus services beginning 1937.

== Government and politics ==
The results of the 1998-2004 federal elections from Speers Point booths

At federal level, Speers Point is within the Division of Charlton, a safe seat for the Australian Labor Party. It has been held since 2007 by former ACTU secretary Greg Combet. The Speers Point booth was won comfortably at the 2007 federal election by the Labor Party, with a two-party preferred vote of 60.97%.

In the New South Wales Legislative Assembly, Speers Point is within the electorate of Lake Macquarie. Normally a safe Labor seat, it was won at the 2007 election by Independent Greg Piper, the former mayor of the Lake Macquarie City Council.

Speers Point is located within the West Ward of the City of Lake Macquarie, and hosts the city's council offices. The offices of the Biraban Local Aboriginal Land Council are also located in the suburb.

Polling place statistics are presented below from the Speers Point polling place in the federal and state elections as indicated.

2007 federal election Source: AEC
Labor	51.2%
Liberal	32.9%
Greens	7.60%
Independent	2.10%
CDP	1.96%

2007 state election Source: ECNSW
Labor	42.9%
Independent	33.1%
Liberal	14.6%
Greens	5.77%
CDP	2.17%

2004 federal election Source: AEC
Labor	48.3%
Liberal	31.6%
Greens	9.37%
Family First	4.03%
Democrats	3.14%

2003 state election Source: ECNSW
Labor	58.1%
Liberal	26.7%
Greens	8.51%
AAFI	3.48%
One Nation	3.19%

2001 federal election Source: AEC
Labor	48.3%
Liberal	31.6%
One Nation	12.9%
Democrats	3.95%
Greens	3.86%

1999 state election Source: ECNSW
Labor	54.1%
Liberal	20.4%
One Nation	14.1%
CDP	4.51%
Greens	4.04%
