= Cameron Park, New South Wales =

Cameron Park
- Suburb
- Coordinates: 32°54′18″S 151°36′32″E
- Country: Australia
- State: New South Wales
- City: Greater Newcastle
- LGA: City of Lake Macquarie
- Location: 16 km (9.9 mi) W of Newcastle
- Established: 1905

Government
  - State electorate: Cessnock
  - Federal division: Hunter

Area
  - Total: 0.9 km^{2} (0.35 sq mi)

Population
  - Total: 9,977 (2021 census)
  - Density: 11,100/km^{2} (28,700/sq mi)
- Postcode: 2285
- Parish: Teralba
Suburbs around Cameron Park
Seahampton	Minmi	Wallsend
West Wallsend	Cameron Park	Edgeworth
Holmesville	Edgeworth	Edgeworth

Cameron Park is a suburb of the City of Lake Macquarie local government area, Greater Newcastle in New South Wales, Australia, located 16 kilometres (10 mi) west of Newcastle's central business district near West Wallsend and the Sydney-Newcastle Freeway.

== History ==
The suburb was originally known as Estelville, named for local politician John Estell, and was first subdivided in 1905. By 1998, the land was owned by the Lake Macquarie City Council, Coal and Allied, BHP Collieries, the Hunter Water Corporation and a few private owners. 140 hectares (346 acres) of the suburb was rezoned as a mixed-use greenfields site as part of the council's Lifestyle 2020 planning strategy early in 1998, and by September, a proposed A$300 million development featuring 1,700 homes, a primary and high school, and a shopping centre with a supermarket, tavern, specialty shops and a commercial area had been announced by development consortium Northlakes Pty Ltd, who forecast the development would be complete within 10–15 years. The council and developers wanted to rename the suburb Cameron Park because of a nearby speedway of that name, which was itself named after Ian Cameron, one of the founders of speedway racing in Australia. A poll of residents in 2000 showed a majority wanted the name changed, with only 1.4% favouring retention of Estelville. Other names considered included Oakwood, as well as "Pambulong", from a clan of the Awabakal Indigenous Australians living nearby whose name was suggested by Tyneside Property Management who were developing an industrial technology park in another part of the suburb.

The Geographical Names Board of New South Wales approved the new name and boundaries in August 2001. Construction subsequently began on 477 lots in the suburb.

Approval was given in August 2005 to build a $6.2-million shopping centre, including a Woolworths supermarket and a Harrigan's Irish pub. Construction finally commenced in January 2016 but the promised schools have not been built (as at July 2023).

== Newcastle Kart Raceway ==
In Cameron Park, there is a go-kart circuit, near the Sydney-Newcastle freeway. The circuit hosts many major national karting events, including the Australian CIK Stars of Karting series and the NSW State Titles.
