= West Wallsend =

- Suburb
- Coordinates: 32°53′53″S 151°35′6″E
- Country: Australia
- State: New South Wales
- City: Greater Newcastle
- LGA: City of Lake Macquarie
- Location: 21 km (13 mi) W of Newcastle; 33 km (21 mi) NNE of Morisset
- Established: 1860s

Government
  - State electorate: Cessnock
  - Federal division: Hunter

Area
  - Total: 2.1 km^{2} (0.81 sq mi)

Population
  - Total: 2,981 (2021 census)
  - Density: 1,420/km^{2} (3,680/sq mi)
- Postcode: 2286
- Parish: Teralba
Suburbs around West Wallsend
Richmond Vale	Seahampton	Seahampton
Heaton	West Wallsend	Cameron Park
Killingworth	Holmesville	Cameron Park

West Wallsend is a suburb and small town in the City of Lake Macquarie, Greater Newcastle in New South Wales, Australia. It is near the Sydney-Newcastle Freeway and the western suburbs of Newcastle.

== History ==
The Awabakal are the traditional people of this area.

== Coal and railways ==
West Wallsend Colliery c1890s, showing main shaft (centre) and air shaft (left), with locomotives at the ready for coal haulage to port

West Wallsend's origins are in coal mining, the main concern being West Wallsend Colliery, from whose boundaries the old town grew. The West Wallsend Coal Company was formed in 1885 with a capital of £90,000 sterling. It secured 2,972 acres (12.03 km^{2}) of freehold land at and around where the township now stands. A shaft of 492 feet (150.0 m) in depth serviced the Borehole seam of almost 5 feet (1.5 m) in thickness.

The coal was shipped by the West Wallsend Coal Company's private railway (which later had several branch line extensions to Seahampton, Fairley, and Killingworth) via Cockle Creek junction onto the government's Main North railway line. An Act of Parliament was passed on 27 August 1886, for the construction of the line and an Amendment passed on 13 July 1887 permitted its connection to the government system. The original line had cost over £16,000, and at Cockle Creek there were seven sets of sidings to handle the output of the collieries which used the line.

At the time of the opening, on 3 July 1888, it was estimated West Wallsend Colliery would produce up to 200,000 tons of coal a year. In 1895 Caledonian Collieries Limited purchased the company, its collieries, and the railway.

During the industry slump in 1923 it was announced that West Wallsend Colliery would close, raising questions in the New South Wales Legislative Assembly. Regardless of massive reserves, the mine closed on 14 September 1923, 5,376,410 tons of coal having been extracted in its relatively short period of operations – 35 years.

A passenger service also once operated between Cockle Creek and West Wallsend, the latter having a fully staffed station where tickets could be purchased to anywhere in the State which had a railway connection. The last passenger service to West Wallsend ran on 13 January 1930, and the line between Seahampton, West Wallsend, and the Fairley (Seaham No.2 Colliery) Junction closed on 26 November 1938. When Seaham No.2 closed in 1945 the only portion of the railway which continued in use, until 1962, was to Killingworth.

One mine still operates in the district but its coal is shipped by road. The mine's owners have announced that it will be closed in 2016 for economic reasons.

== Transport ==
In the early years of the 20th century, a steam tram service operated from West Wallsend via Young Wallsend to Wallsend where there was a large shopping district and where it also connected with the electric trams which ran into Newcastle.

== Education ==
A primary school was opened in November 1889. West Wallsend High School opened in 1962.

== Politics ==
West Wallsend is located in the federal Division of Charlton, which elects one member to the Australian House of Representatives. The current member, 2013 federal election, is Australian Labor Party member Pat Conroy. At state level, after a redistribution in 2006, West Wallsend moved from the Lake Macquarie electorate to the Cessnock electorate. The current State Member is Australian Labor Party member Clayton Barr.

The booth at West Wallsend is considered very safe for the Labor Party.

2007 federal election Source: AEC
Labor	67.1%
Liberal	17.0%
Greens	9.73%
Independent	2.04%
Independent	1.62%

2007 state election Source: NSWEC
Labor	63.6%
The Nationals	20.8%
Greens	15.6%

2004 federal election Source: AEC
Labor	57.6%
Liberal	21.2%
Greens	8.36%
Family First	6.79%
One Nation	4.05%

2003 state election Source: NSWEC
Labor	64.9%
Liberal	17.4%
Greens	9.87%
One Nation	4.28%
AAFI	3.48%

2001 federal election Source: AEC
Labor	61.4%
Liberal	17.7%
One Nation	8.60%
Greens	6.40%
Democrats	3.06%

1999 state election Source: NSWEC
Labor	62.7%
One Nation	15.1%
Liberal	9.58%
Greens	6.01%
CDP	3.57%

== See also ==
- West Wallsend FC
