= Garden Suburb, New South Wales =

Garden Suburb
- Suburb
- Coordinates: 32°56′56″S 151°39′04″E
- Country: Australia
- State: New South Wales
- Region: Hunter Region
- City: Greater Newcastle
- LGA: City of Lake Macquarie
- Location: 2 km (1.2 mi) SE of Cardiff; 15 km (9.3 mi) SW of Newcastle; 36 km (22 mi) SE of Maitland; 56 km (35 mi) N of The Entrance; 149 km (93 mi) NNE of Sydney
- Established: 1872

Government
  - State electorate: Charlestown
  - Federal divisions: Hunter; Shortland

Area
  - Total: 3.09 km^{2} (1.19 sq mi)
- Elevation: 70 m (230 ft)

Population
  - Total: 1,959 (SAL 2021)
- Postcodes: * 2285 (West Side): 2289 (East Side)
Suburbs around Garden Suburb
Cardiff Heights	Rankin Park	New Lambton Heights
Cardiff	Garden Suburb	Kotara
Cardiff South	Hillsborough	Kotara South

Garden Suburb is a small semi-rural suburb in the City of Lake Macquarie local government area in the Greater Newcastle area in the state of New South Wales, Australia. It is located 2 kilometres east of Cardiff.

== History ==
The Aboriginal people in this area, the Awabakal, were the first people of this land.

The first land grant was to James Peatie in August 1872. The street Peaties Road now carries his name.

Another land grant was given to John Cherry in March 1876.

The first subdivision occurred in 1918, encompassing Prospect Road, Park Road and Marshall Street. This appears to be the time the area was given the name 'Garden Suburb'.

A post office opened in 1956 and the local primary school opened in 1958.

The Forest Hills Estate was constructed between 1999 and 2005 in the south. The streets were named with a theme of flora.

The suburb had a post office and a convenience store, however these closed in 1987 and 2007, respectively.

== Geography ==
The suburb is surrounded by bushland, and can only be accessed from Myall Road. The area is hilly, with its highest point at 32°56′40″S 151°40′53″E at Prospect Road and lowest point at Garden Suburb Creek.

Three creeks flow through the area:

- Winding Creek: Starts near Hillsborough and flows into Cockle Creek, then into Lake Macquarie.
- Tickhole Creek: Starts near Newcastle Bypass and flows into Winding Creek.
- Garden Suburb Creek: Starts from dam in Campbell Reserve and flows into Tickhole Creek.

== Development Proposal ==
Landcom Corporation proposed a 96-lot development in 2013, in the bushland near Myall Road. After initial objections, the project was shelved for several years.

In 2020, the project was fast-tracked after the coronavirus pandemic, and approved in December 2020. The development was scaled back to 66-lots in January.
