= Adamstown Heights =

- Suburb
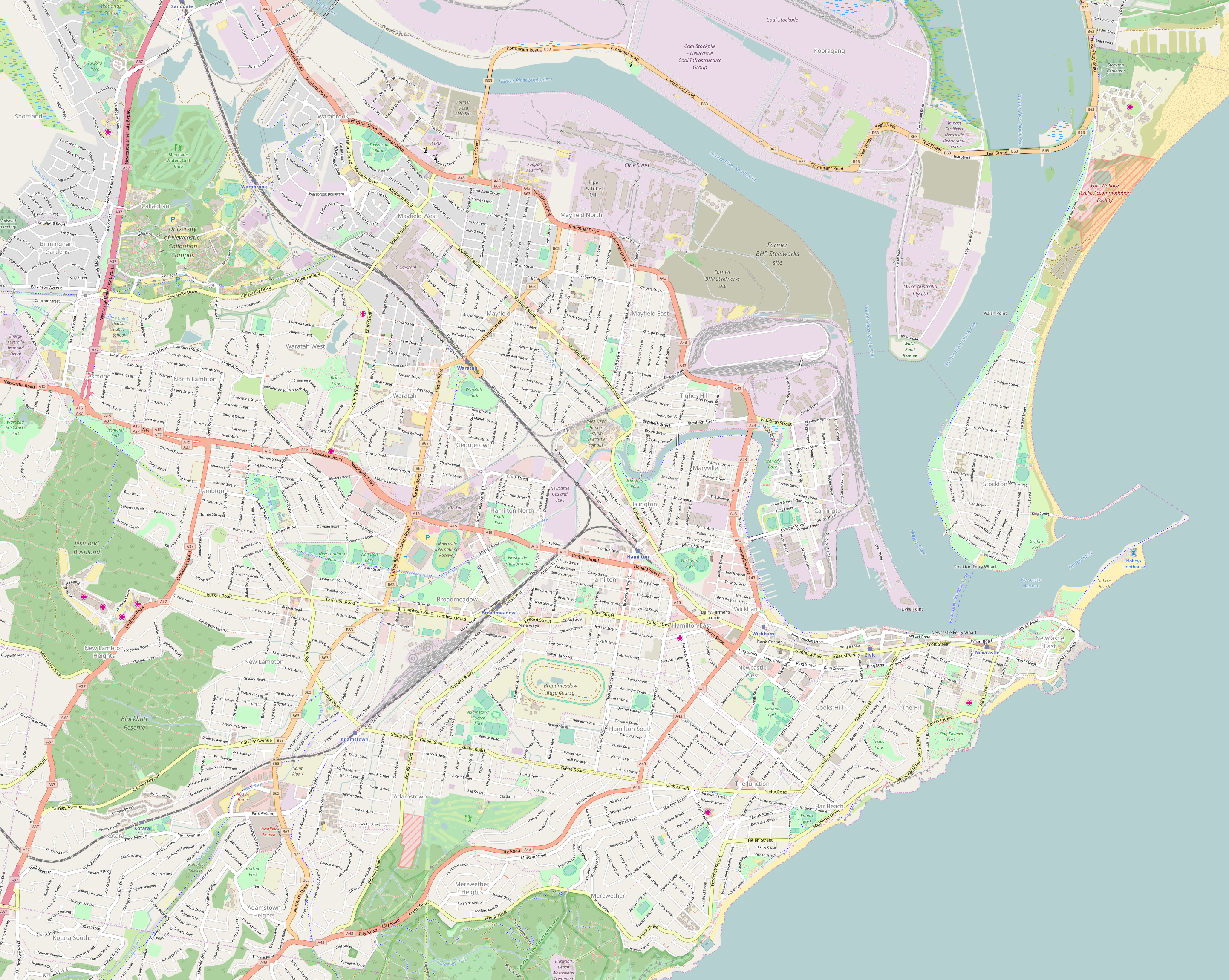
- Interactive map of Adamstown Heights
- Coordinates: 32°56′53″S 151°42′40″E
- Country: Australia
- State: New South Wales
- City: Newcastle
- LGAs: City of Lake Macquarie; City of Newcastle
- Location: 8 km (5.0 mi) WSW of Newcastle; 3 km (1.9 mi) NE of Charlestown; 36 km (22 mi) SE of Maitland; 56 km (35 mi) N of The Entrance; 150 km (93 mi) NNE of Sydney

Government
  - State electorate: Charlestown
  - Federal divisions: Newcastle; Shortland

Area
  - Total: 3.1 km^{2} (1.2 sq mi)
- Elevation: 64 m (210 ft)

Population
  - Total: 5,621 (SAL 2021)
- Postcode: 2289
- Parish: Newcastle
Suburbs around Adamstown Heights
Kotara	Kotara	Adamstown
Kotara South	Adamstown Heights	Merewether
Charlestown	Kahibah	Highfields

Adamstown Heights is a southern suburb of Newcastle, New South Wales, Australia, located 8 kilometres (5 mi) west-southwest of Newcastle's central business district along the Pacific Highway. It is split between the City of Lake Macquarie and City of Newcastle local government areas. On 6 September 1991 Adamstown heights officially become a suburb of Newcastle.

The Awabakal are the traditional owners of this area.

The suburb contains two schools, Kotara High School, established in 1968 and containing 3 hectares of native bushland, and also established in 1968 Belair Public School. The suburb is served by Westfield Kotara shopping centre, formerly Garden City Kotara, and originally Kotara Fair, on its northern border.

Adamstown Heights is located on several Newcastle Transport bus routes and is near two railway stations on the Main Northern railway line, Kotara and Adamstown.

Adamstown Heights had a population of 5,621 in 2021.
