= Elermore Vale =

- Suburb
- Interactive map of Elermore Vale
- Coordinates: 32°54′54″S 151°40′05″E
- Country: Australia
- State: New South Wales
- City: Newcastle
- LGAs: City of Newcastle; City of Lake Macquarie
- Location: 13 km (8.1 mi) W of Newcastle; 150 km (93 mi) N of Sydney; 32 km (20 mi) SE of Maitland; 62 km (39 mi) N of The Entrance; 80 km (50 mi) N of Gosford

Government
  - State electorate: Wallsend
  - Federal division: Newcastle

Area
  - Total: 2.6 km^{2} (1.0 sq mi)
- Elevation: 14 m (46 ft)

Population
  - Total: 6,057 (SAL 2021)
- Postcode: 2287
- Parish: Kahibah
Suburbs around Elermore Vale
Wallsend	Wallsend	Lambton
Edgeworth	Elermore Vale	New Lambton Heights
Edgeworth	Glendale	Rankin Park

Elermore Vale is a suburb on the western outskirts of Newcastle, New South Wales. Before becoming a residential suburb in the 1900s, the area was used for chicken farming, cattle farming, and coal mining. By the 1960s, the school and the other facilities of the suburb had been established.

Previously known as Wallsend South before being renamed Elermore Vale. Elermore Vale had a population of around 5,500 in 2016. Elermore Vale is very well located within the Newcastle region, with the beaches being 10km in a straight line, and access to the M1 (formerly the F3) Freeway being within 10 minutes also. It is close to several major shopping centres, being Stockland Glendale and Westfield Kotara. Housing is generally a mix of single dwelling or townhouses, with an increasing number of knock-down rebuilds occurring.

Plans for development of a retirement village, a A$6 million project by developers Pepperwood Ridge to create 72 self-care units for 800 people, in Elermore Vale have caused controversy. In 2004 Newcastle City Council defended an appeal made by the developers in the New South Wales Land and Environment Court.

The suburb is served by Newcastle Transport bus routes 26 and 46 and Hunter Valley Buses routes 259, 263 and 270.

There are 2 public schools within Elermore Vale, Elermore Vale Public School and Wallsend South public school.

The Elermore Hotel was the starting and finishing point for the annual Shaft Shuffle Fun Run, organised by the Elermore Vale Lions.

At the 2016 Australian census, the median age of resident was 40, 81.5% were born in Australia and 84.9% only spoke English at home.
