= Cardiff Heights =

- Suburb
- Coordinates: 32.911035°S 151.618744°E
- Country: Australia
- State: New South Wales
- City: Newcastle
- LGA: City of Lake Macquarie
- Location: 13 km (8.1 mi) W of Newcastle; 6 km (3.7 mi) NNW of Charlestown; 34 km (21 mi) SE of Maitland; 56 km (35 mi) NNE of The Entrance; 150 km (93 mi) NNE of Sydney

Government
  - State electorates: Charlestown; Wallsend
  - Federal divisions: Shortland; Newcastle

Area
  - Total: 1.6 km^{2} (0.62 sq mi)
- Elevation: 102 m (335 ft)

Population
  - Total: 1,384 (2021 census)
  - Density: 865/km^{2} (2,240/sq mi)
- Postcode: 2285
- Parish: Kahibah
Suburbs around Cardiff Heights
Glendale	Elermore Vale	Rankin Park
Cardiff	Cardiff Heights	New Lambton Heights
Cardiff	Cardiff	Garden Suburb

Cardiff Heights is a suburb of the City of Lake Macquarie, Greater Newcastle, New South Wales, Australia. It is located 13 kilometres (8 mi) west of Newcastle's central business district, and is part of the City of Lake Macquarie West Ward.
