= Tickhole Tunnel =

Heritage listed railway tunnel in New South Wales, Australia

- Interactive map of Tickhole Tunnel

Overview
- Other name: Kotara (Tickhole) Railway Tunnel
- Line: Main Northern railway
- Location: Hunter Region, New South Wales, Australia
- Coordinates: 32°56′38″S 151°41′11″E
- System: NSW Trains
- Crosses: Tickhole Creek; Newcastle Inner City Bypass (A37)
- Start: Kotara
- End: Cardiff

Operation
- Opened: 15 August 1887
- Owner: RailCorp

Technical
- Length: 165 metres (180 yd) (northbound); 205 metres (224 yd) (southbound)
- No. of tracks: 2
- Track gauge: 4 ft 8 1/2 in (1,435 mm) standard gauge
- Electrified: 1984

New South Wales Heritage Database (Local Government Register)
- Official name: Kotara (Tickhole) Railway Tunnel
- Designated: 28 May 2009
- Reference no.: s.170

The Tickhole Tunnel, also called the Kotara (Tickhole) Railway Tunnel, is a heritage-listed double track railway tunnel that carries the Main Northern railway line beneath the Newcastle Inner City Bypass (A37) and is a diversion over the Tickhole Creek. The tunnel is located between Cardiff and Kotara stations in the City of Newcastle local government area of New South Wales, Australia.

The original 161-metre (176 yd) tunnel opened on 15 August 1887. It initially only had one track, but provision was made for the line to be duplicated which duly occurred in 1891. As part of the electrification of the line, in 1983 tenders were called for a second tunnel, of 205 metres (673 ft), completed in 1984. This second tunnel is used by southbound services, while the original tunnel once again became single track for northbound services.

== See also ==
- List of tunnels in Australia
