= Cardiff station =

Cardiff station may refer to:

- Cardiff Bay railway station in Wales
- Cardiff Central bus station in Wales
- Cardiff Central railway station in Wales
- Cardiff Queen Street railway station in Wales
- Cardiff railway station, New South Wales in Australia
