= Lake Macquarie Transport Interchange =

Transport project in Australia

General information
- Location: Pennant Street, Cardiff; Australia
- Owner: Transport Asset Manager of New South Wales
- Operator: Sydney Trains
- Line: Main Northern

Construction
- Structure type: Ground
- Accessible: Yes

Services
Preceding station	Intercity Trains	Following station
Cardiff towards Newcastle Interchange	Central Coast & Newcastle Line	Cockle Creek towards Central

Lake Macquarie Transport Interchange (also known as the Glendale Transport Interchange and Pennant Street Bridge) is a planned transport interchange in the suburbs of Glendale and Cardiff in the City of Lake Macquarie, New South Wales, Australia.

Stage One Section One consists of a road realignment and extension of Glendale Drive on an alignment between Stockland Glendale and Cardiff Locomotive Workshops; Section Two consists of a new bridge over the Main Northern railway line, connecting Pennant Street and the Cardiff industrial estate.

Stage two is set to include a new railway station and bus interchange, however this stage of the project is yet to be funded. The project is being managed by Lake Macquarie City Council.

Construction commenced on Stage One Section One in July 2015 on stage one of the project, with an extension of Glendale Drive from Glendale to Cardiff opening in June 2017.

In June 2017 the state government committed $1.7 million to fund the preparation of a business case to complete the project. However, in June 2018, the state government announced that it will not fund the new bridge across the railway line.
