= Old Newcastle Club Building =

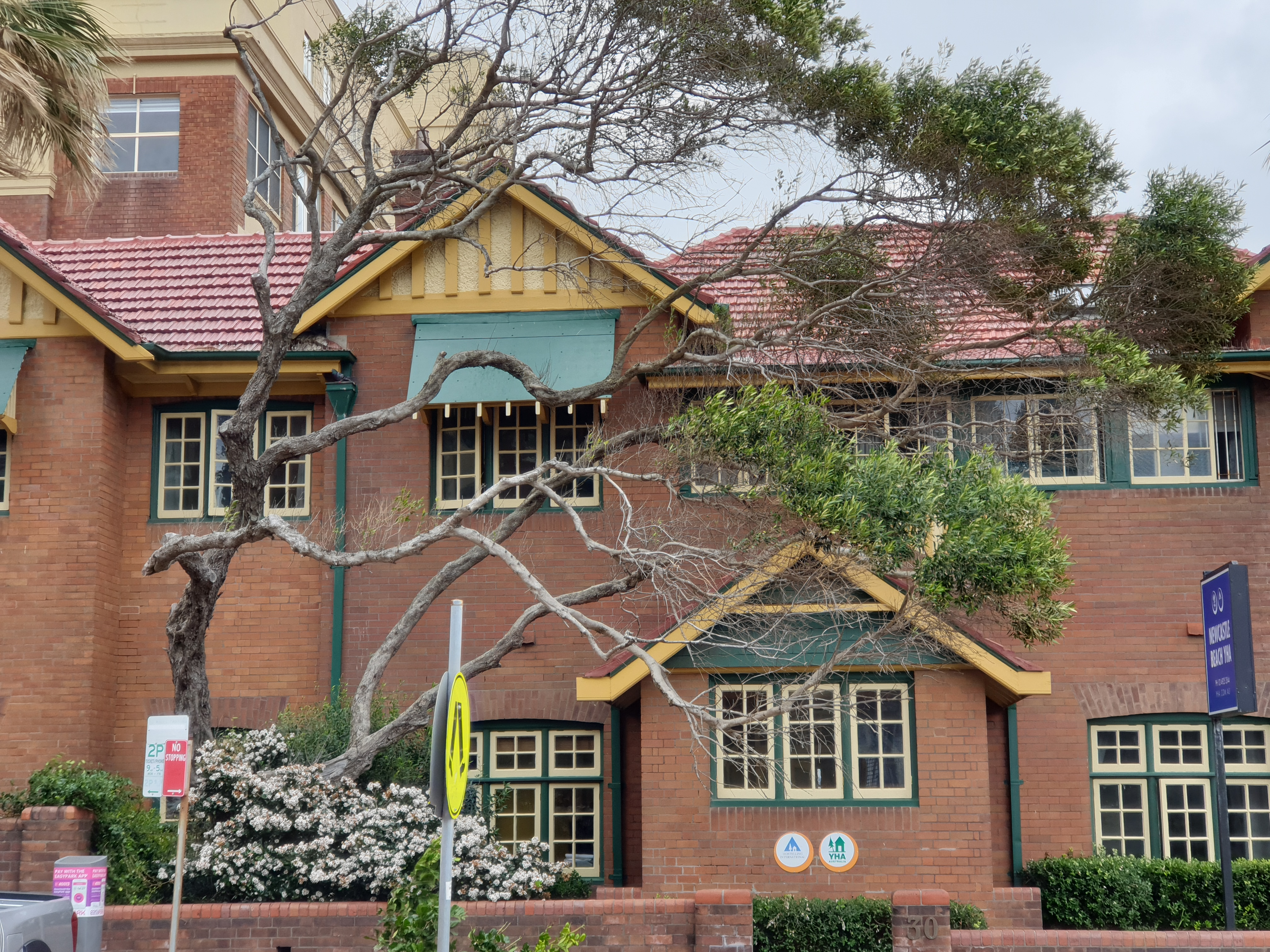

- Location within New South Wales Location within Australia
- 32.9288°S 151.7850°E
- Location: 30 Pacific Street, Newcastle, City of Newcastle, New South Wales, Australia

History
- Built: 1913–1917

Site notes
- Architect: F. G. Castleden

New South Wales Heritage Register
- Official name: Royal Newcastle Hospital – The Club Building; The Club Building – Royal Newcastle Hospital
- Type: state heritage (built)
- Designated: 2 April 1999
- Reference no.: 824
- Type: Hospital
- Category: Health Services

The Old Newcastle Club Building is a former gentlemen's club and hospital building and now youth hostel at 30 Pacific Street, Newcastle, City of Newcastle, New South Wales, Australia. It was added to the New South Wales State Heritage Register on 2 April 1999.

== History ==
It was built in 1910–11 as the original premises of the Newcastle Club. It was designed by F. G. Castleden and built by Davis and Sons. The club agreed to vacate their premises when it was sought by the new Royal Newcastle Hospital, and it was taken over by the hospital in 1917.

It was used for a variety of hospital purposes, initially as the Newcastle Nurses Home and in later years as clinical offices and staff recreation facilities. Hunter Health sold the building to developer Brien Cornwell in 1997, after which time it was renovated as a youth hostel. It now operates as the Newcastle Beach YHA.

== Description ==
The Old Newcastle Club Building is a two-storey domestic scale building in the Queen Anne style with an asymmetrical plan, achieving an appearance of a large cottage. It was constructed in two stages, as evidenced by the change in brickwork and mortar, terracotta roof tiles.

The building was central to the former hospital, with enclosed links with the Nurses' Home and Wheeler House. It has a relatively intact interior. The forecourt contains two significant palms.

== Heritage listing ==
The Old Newcastle Club Building is a distinctive Federation Queen Anne style domestic scaled building which provides an important townscape element within the Royal Newcastle Hospital group.

It was listed on the New South Wales State Heritage Register on 2 April 1999.
