= Westfield Kotara =

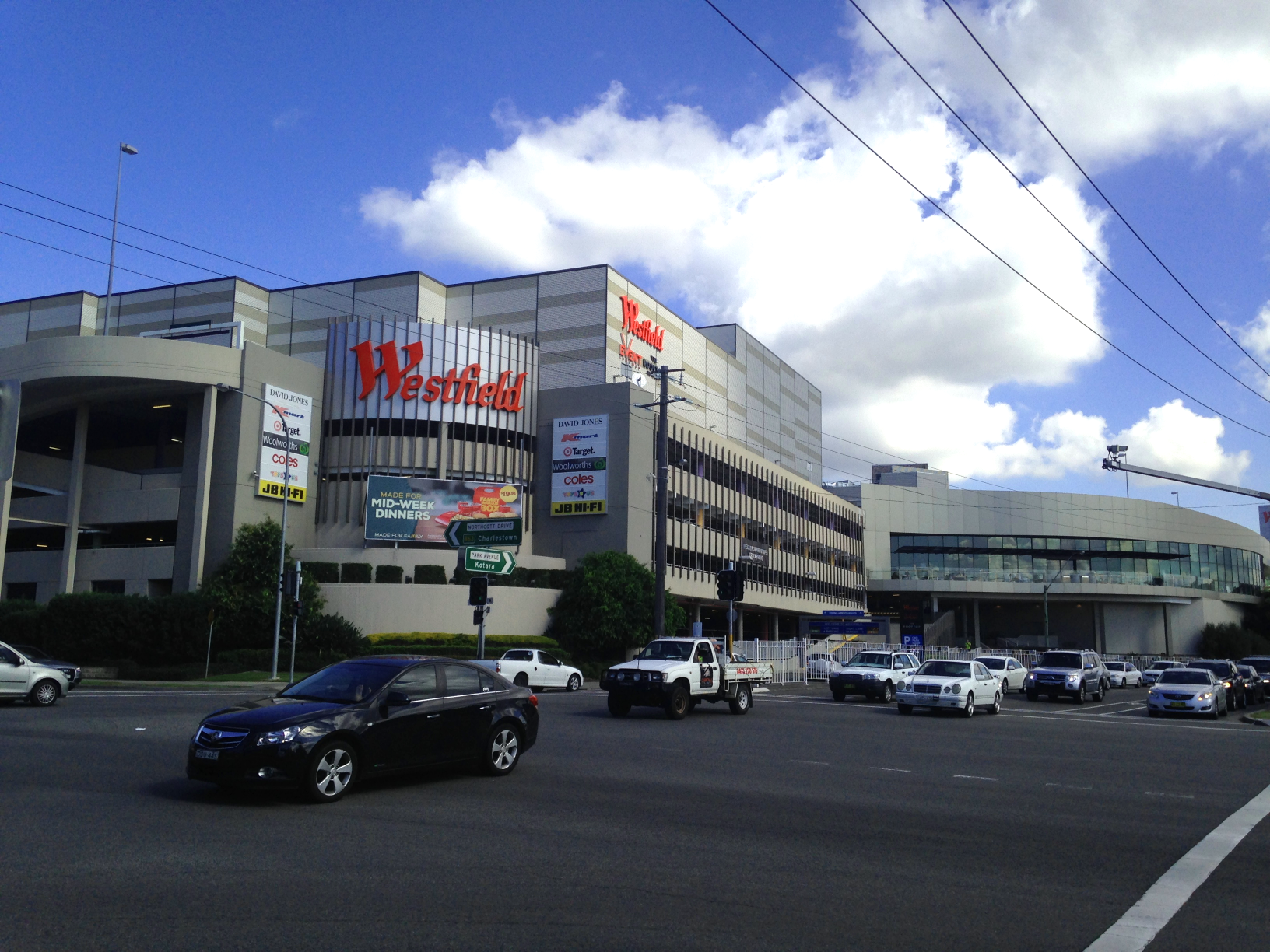
- Westfield Kotara from the corner of Northcott Drive and Park Avenue
- Location: Kotara, New South Wales, Australia
- Coordinates: 32°56′32″S 151°42′40″E
- Address: Corner of Park Avenue & Northcott Drive
- Opened: 6 October 1965; 61 years ago
- Previous names: Kotara Fair (1965–1974); Garden City (1974–2003)
- Developer: Woolworths Properties
- Manager: Scentre Group
- Owner: Scentre Group
- Num. of stores: 269
- Num. of anchor tenants: 6
- Floor area: 81,983 m^{2} (882,458 sq ft)
- Floors: 3
- Parking: 3,180 spaces
- Public transit: Kotara; Park Avenue
- Website: www.westfield.com.au/kotara

Westfield Kotara (previously known as Kotara Fair and Garden City) is a large shopping centre in the Newcastle suburb of Kotara in the Hunter region of New South Wales, Australia.

Westfield Kotara is one of the two Westfield branded shopping centres in New South Wales that is not located within the Greater Sydney area, with Westfield Tuggerah being located on the Central Coast.

== Transport ==
Kotara station is 900 metres away from Westfield Kotara and is on the Main Northern railway line. The station is serviced by Sydney Trains services which operate between Sydney, the Central Coast and Newcastle CBD.

Westfield Kotara is served by Newcastle Transport bus services to Broadmeadow, Charlestown, Swansea Heads, Wallsend and Warners Bay, as well as local surrounding suburbs. All bus routes operate on Park Avenue outside the centre.

Westfield Kotara has multi-level car parks with 3,180 spaces.

== History ==
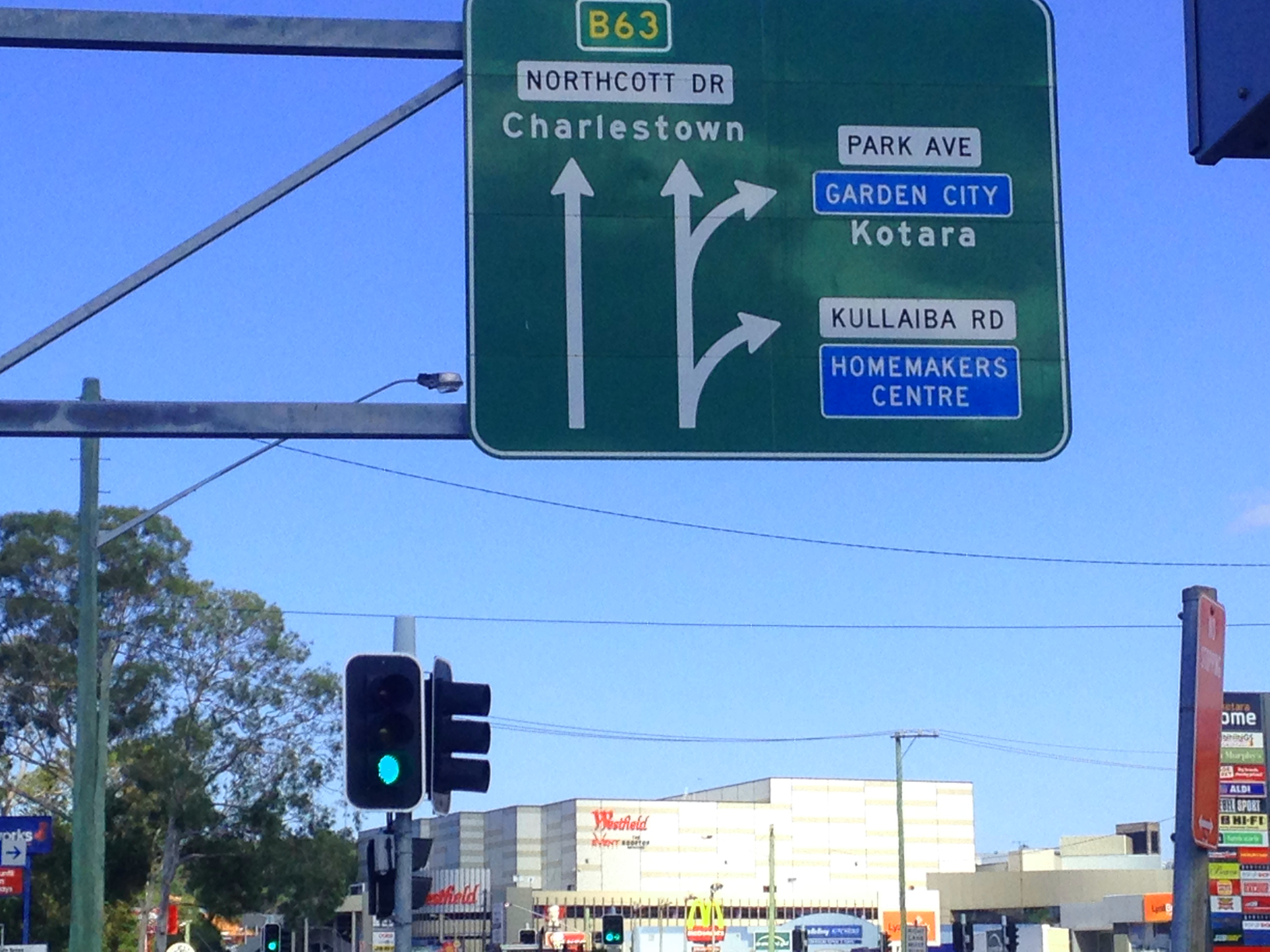
An outdated sign on Northcott Drive reflecting the centre's former name

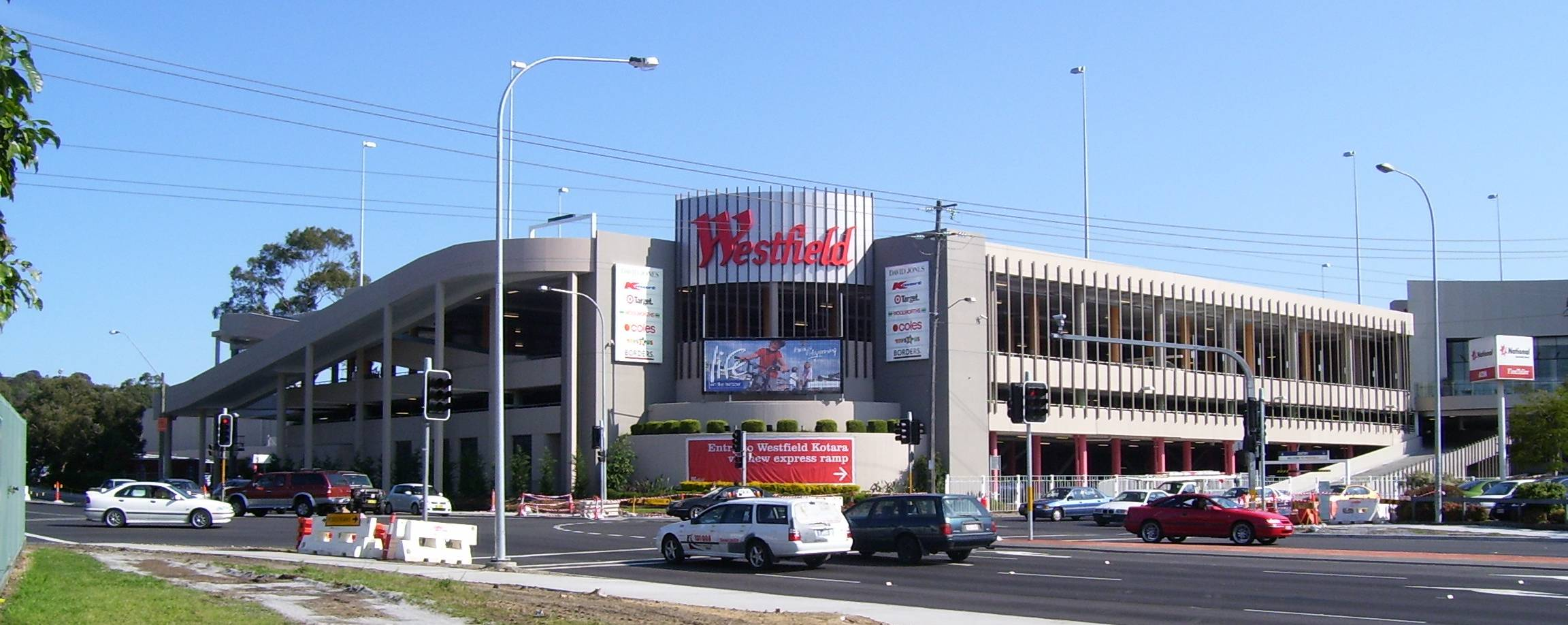
Westfield Kotara viewed from Park Avenue in September 2007

=== 20th Century ===
==== 1960s: opening ====
Kotara Fair opened on 6 October 1965 on a seven-hectare former grazing land. It was developed by Woolworths Properties at a cost of £2 million. The single level centre featured a Woolworths supermarket, a Big W department store, 25 speciality stores and a carpark with 600 spaces. Kotara Fair was the first major “drive-in” shopping centre in Newcastle and rapidly became a destination for the whole Hunter Region.

==== 1970s ====
In 1971, David Jones Properties purchased Kotara Fair and later acquired additional land nearby to expand the centre. In that same year plans were drawn to extend the centre to consolidate its strong position in the marketplace.

The $8 million expansion began in early 1973 and was completed in October 1974. Kotara Fair was renamed Garden City in line with other David Jones "Garden City" centres. The centre’s new identity was marked by its striking Bird of Paradise symbol on the logo. The Big W department store closed and was replaced by David Jones. After the redevelopment was completed Garden City featured a David Jones department store, Norman Ross, Woolworths supermarket and 51 speciality stores.

Further redevelopment occurred in 1977 when Norman Ross closed on level one. This provided the establishment of the Top Mall which provided space for 13 additional retailers in the centre including Shoeys, Best & Less, Reuben F Scarf and Angus & Coote. This extension also provided the centre with eight offices and professional suites.

==== 1980s ====
In 1980 Garden City was purchased by AMP for $104 million and later launched a $62 million redevelopment in mid 1984. After 3.5 years of expansion, it became the largest shopping centre in the Hunter Region. The grand opening of Garden City was on 15 March 1988. The $62 million expansion added a Super Kmart and Venture department store as well as bringing the total number of retailers to 120. It also added skylights, indoor greenery, modern food hall and a family-friendly design.

On 28 December 1989, shortly after completion of another expansion program, the centre suffered significant damage during the Newcastle earthquake. Most affected were the upper levels of the car park adjacent to Northcott Drive and the Super Kmart. Despite the damage, repairs were affected quickly.

==== 1990s ====
The Super Kmart store was split into Kmart and Coles in 1990. In 1995 Coles relocated to the ground level and Toys "R" Us opened in its place. Garden City was refurbished in 1998 with the relocation of Woolworths and the addition of 14 speciality stores and an additional 148 car parking spaces.

=== 21st Century ===
==== 2000s ====
Following the purchase of Garden City by the Westfield Group, the centre was renamed Westfield Kotara on 11 August 2003. Westfield Group spent over a year planning to expand the centre to significantly increased its size.

The major redevelopment commenced on 8 May 2006 and added a Target discount department store, JB Hi-Fi and 120 speciality stores. The new food court and half the mall opened on 16 August 2007. The Fashion Mall was completed in September 2007.

==== 2010s ====
In 2010 a development application was submitted for an eight-screen cinema complex and possible ten pin bowling alley as part of a $12.5 million expansion, in response to the opening of the newly redeveloped Charlestown Square in late 2010.

The $55 million redevelopment commenced in April 2015 on parts of the rooftop car park. On 26 November 2015 the open air entertainment precinct known as "The Rooftop" opened. The Rooftop has design drawn from the Hunter Valley Vineyards and the relaxed Novocastrian approach to life. The Rooftop included between eight and 10 local and national restaurants and food outlets and a live music venue. A new eight screen Event Cinemas complex opened on 17 December 2015 just in time for the Star Wars: The Force Awakens film.

On 12 October 2017 Westfield Kotara commenced its $160 million redevelopment. During this development Kmart, JB Hi-Fi and Toys "R" Us temporarily closed. The redevelopment was completed in October 2018 with the grand opening date on 18 October 2018. Swedish retailer H&M opened on 4 October. This development featured new Youth and Urban Precinct on level 2 located next to H&M and is in line with the region’s surf, skate and lifestyle culture and includes a diverse mix of retailers. The youth precinct features a mini skatepark complete with half-pipe inside Parrey Skate store. It also featured a new look Kmart and JB Hi-Fi. The level 2 mall featured natural skylight that runs throughout the mall and darker accent colours to give it a modern edge. Travelators were installed to provide better access to Level 2, 2M and 3. Spanish retailer Zara opened on level 2 on 8 November 2018.

This development also included the extension of "The Rooftop" precinct which included the opening of a gym, six restaurants and Timezone which opened in April 2019. Since the original development application was to include a bowling alley, this was later dropped. However Timezone features a bowling alley, laser tag, Spin Zone bumper cars and gaming arcades.

There were also changes in the car park with over 500 spaces added. The new level 3 car park features both outdoor and undercover car spaces and a solar-powered shade canopy, as part of the centre’s broader sustainability redevelopment.

==== 2020s ====
In February 2021, H&M announced that it would be closing up to seven stores across Australia with Kotara being one of them. H&M closed in late 2024 and the space was split into three retail tenancies.

On 8 October 2022, the 2500m² Zara store closed down. The space was split into retail tenancies fronting the inside of the centre and a small mini-major with a new entrance to the level 2 car park.

== Tenants ==
Westfield Kotara has 82,433m^{2} of floor space. The major retailers include David Jones, Kmart, Target, Coles, Woolworths, JB Hi-Fi, Timezone and Event Cinemas.

== See also ==
- List of shopping centres in Australia
