= Kotara High School =

Location
- Lexington Parade, Adamstown Heights, Newcastle, New South Wales; Australia; 32°56′50″S 151°42′27″E

Information
- Type: Government-funded co-educational comprehensive secondary day school
- Motto: We Aim High
- Established: January 1968; 58 years ago
- School district: Glenrock; Regional North
- Educational authority: New South Wales Department of Education
- Principal: Mark Sneddon
- Teaching staff: 76.8 FTE (2018)
- Years: 7–12
- Enrolment: 1,070 (2018)
- Campus type: Urban
- Colours: Green, white, black and yellow
- Song: We Aim High
- Website: kotara-h.schools.nsw.gov.au

Kotara High School is a government-funded co-educational comprehensive secondary day school, located in Adamstown Heights, a suburb of Newcastle, New South Wales, Australia.

Established in 1968, the school enrolled approximately 1,070 students in 2018, from Year 7 to Year 12, of whom three percent identified as Indigenous Australians and eleven percent were from a language background other than English. The school is operated by the New South Wales Department of Education and its current principal is Mark Sneddon.

== Description ==
Kotara High School has four main buildings, named A, B, C and D "blocks" respectively. Other major buildings include the Administration building (built in 2018) which houses administrative staff as well as the senior leadership team, and the multi-purpose centre used for assemblies, performance, and sporting activities. In the centre of the school is the quadrangle with a COLA structure used for shade at one end. The school also features two basketball/netball courts, a field, and a canteen building equipped with facilities to play net sports as well as change rooms and shower amenities. The school's colours are green, black, yellow and white.

== School organisation ==
The school is divided in to eight main academic faculties. These are English, Science, Mathematics, Human Society and Its Environment, Technology and Applied Sciences, Personal Development and Health, Support Unit, and the Language, Art and Music faculty. Each faculty is led by a Head Teacher, there is also a Head Teacher of Administration, and a Head Teacher of Teaching & Learning. Until recently, the school had a Social Science faculty and a History faculty, however these have now been merged.

The school is led by the Principal and three Deputy Principals.

== School events ==
Highlights of the school calendar include annual swimming, athletics, cross country carnivals and more recently, the "Big Day Out", an event in which performing arts students from the school showcase a mini concert.

== See also ==
- List of government schools in New South Wales: G–P
- Education in Australia
