= Stockland Glendale =

Glendale City Centre

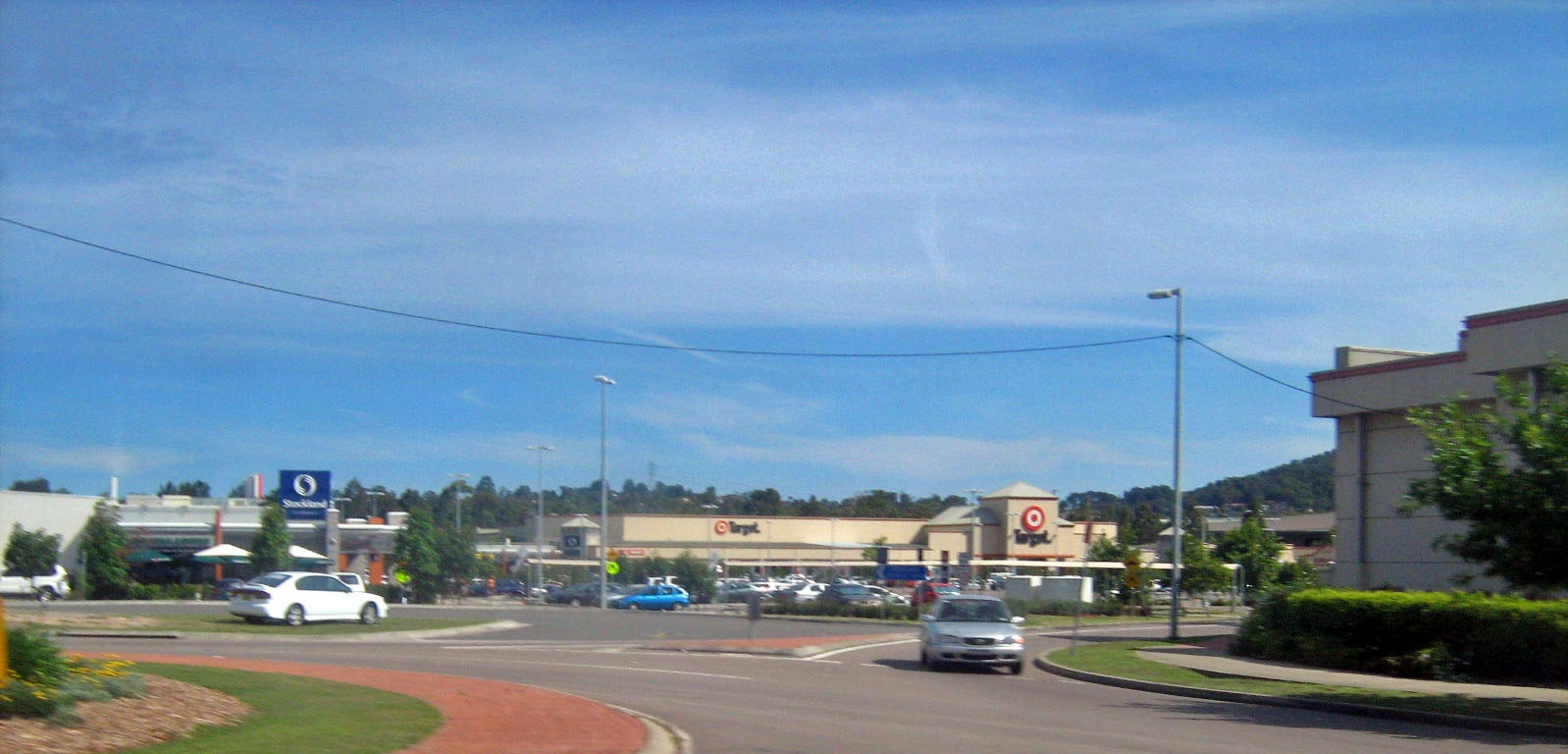
- Southern end of Glendale City Centre
- Location: Glendale, New South Wales, Australia
- Coordinates: 32°55′55″S 151°38′22″E
- Address: 387 Lake Rd, Glendale NSW 2285
- Opened: March 1996; 30 years ago
- Developer: Stockland Glendale
- Manager: IP Generation
- Owner: IP Generation
- Num. of stores: 95
- Num. of anchor tenants: 5
- Floor area: 54,786 m^{2} (589,712 sq ft)
- Floors: 1
- Parking: 2,312 spaces
- Website: glendalecitycentre.com.au

Glendale City Centre (previously known as Stockland Super Centre Glendale and Stockland Glendale) is a large shopping centre located in the suburb of Glendale in the City of Lake Macquarie, Australia.

It is located on Lake Road on a 19.6-hectare (48.4-acre) parcel of land, and primarily serves the Lake Macquarie region to the southwest of Newcastle.

== Transport ==
Glendale City Centre has bus connections to Belmont, Cardiff, Charlestown, Kotara, Newcastle, Seahampton, Swansea, Toronto, Warners Bay, Wallsend and West Wallsend, as well as local surrounding suburbs. It is served by Newcastle Transport and Hunter Valley Buses. The majority of its bus services are located at the bus stop outside Event Cinemas.

Glendale City Centre has a large open car park with 2,312 spaces.

There are plans for a new Lake Macquarie Transport Interchange which was to include a new railway station, bus interchange and road bridge over the railway line. It was first proposed in the mid-1990s and was to be built in 1998 with a completion date in 2003 with a total cost of around $33 million. Construction of stage one commenced in July 2015 and was completed in June 2017 which was an extension of Glendale Drive which is two roads built on either side of the Main Northern railway line. Stage two is set to include a new railway station and bus interchange, however this stage of the project is yet to be funded the state government announced that it will not fund the new bridge across the railway line. The project was managed by Lake Macquarie City Council.

== History ==
Stockland released a concept plan for the Glendale Super Centre in 1994. It was being developed as a US-style power centre consisting of category killer traders, where tenants traded in an open air environment and there was no internal malls. The tenants listed in the proposal included Target, Woolworths, Franklins Big Fresh, Homeart, World 4 Kids, and 50 specialty stores, including free-standing fast food outlets. Stockland Super Centre Glendale opened in March 1996 and was renamed in the early 2000s to Stockland Glendale. On 19 December 1996 the eight screen Village Cinemas (later rebranded to Greater Union in early 2000s) opened along with the Intencity arcade.

In 2001, the Franklins Big Fresh store closed and was replaced by Coles and First Choice Liquor super store.

The World 4 Kids store closed in 2002 and was replaced by Aldi and JB Hi-Fi.

In December 2005, Stockland completed an 8,749 m^{2} expansion to the centre, adding a Kmart and 17 specialty stores. The Kmart store was previously located in Charlestown Square which closed in August 2004 and relocated to Glendale.

In 2010, Greater Union was rebranded to Event Cinemas.

On 13 December 2018, Carl's Jr opened its second New South Wales outlet on a site near Kmart.

== Future ==
In June 2015, there is currently a proposal to double the retail space in the centre, as part of a $60 million plan. It is predicted to create 278 retail jobs and 330 construction jobs. The plan includes 50 new specialty stores, a new expanded Coles supermarket, an enclosed mall with a row of specialty shops in front of existing shops and a ‘‘boulevard restaurant precinct’’, with casual dining areas linking the shops and cinema.

This development application was approved on 16 November 2018. However the conditions of the approval were yet to be revealed considering no work had begun on the nearby Lake Macquarie Transport Interchange.

== Tenants ==
Glendale City Centre has 54,786 m^{2} of floor space. The major retailers include Kmart, Target, Coles, Woolworths, Cotton On, TK Maxx, JB Hi-Fi, Rebel and Event Cinemas.
