= Kotara South =

Kotara South Greater Newcastle, New South Wales
- Coordinates: 32°57′04″S 151°41′28″E
- Population: 1,267 (SAL 2021)
- Established: 1829
- Postcode(s): 2289
- Elevation: 56 m (184 ft)
- Area: 0.6 km^{2} (0.2 sq mi)
- Location: 11 km (7 mi) WSW of Newcastle; 2 km (1 mi) NW of Charlestown; 79 km (49 mi) NNE of Gosford; 56 km (35 mi) NNE of The Entrance; 151 km (94 mi) NNE of Sydney
- LGA(s): City of Lake Macquarie
- Parish: Kahibah
- State electorate(s): Charlestown
- Federal division(s): Shortland; Newcastle
Suburbs around Kotara South:
Garden Suburb	Kotara	Kotara
Garden Suburb	Kotara South	Adamstown Heights
Hillsborough	Charlestown	Adamstown Heights

Kotara South is a suburb of the City of Lake Macquarie, Greater Newcastle in New South Wales, Australia 11 kilometres (7 mi) from Newcastle's central business district.

== History ==
The Aboriginal people, in this area, the Awabakal, were the first people of this land.
