= No. 2 Fighter Sector RAAF =

Royal Australian Air Force unit

No. 2 Fighter Sector (2FS) was a Royal Australian Air Force (RAAF) unit formed at New Lambton, Newcastle, New South Wales on 25 February 1942. No. 2 Fighter Sector was responsible for fighter aircraft control and coordination for the Newcastle and Hunter Region.

The RAAF commandeered New Lambton Public School at New Lambton for use as an operations and plotting facility on 9 March 1942. The headmaster's residence at New Lambton Public School was used as No. 2 Fighter Sector Headquarters.

No. 2 Fighter Sector became a Central Training School on 30 May 1942, to train operations room personnel and to conduct refresher courses for personnel from No. 1 Fighter Sector RAAF, No. 3 Fighter Sector RAAF, No. 7 Fighter Sector RAAF and No. 8 Fighter Sector RAAF, as well as the United States Army Air Corps (USAAC).

On 18 October 1943, No. 2 Fighter Sector was renamed as No. 102 Fighter Sector (102FS) and on 3 March 1944 it was again renamed as No. 102 Fighter Control Unit (102FCU). On 27 November 1944, No. 102 Fighter Control Unit moved to Ash Island.

No. 102 Fighter Control Unit was disbanded on 12 February 1945.

== Commanding officers ==
- M.H. Everest (RAF) (SqnLdr) – 9 March 1942
- H.A. Conaghan (SqnLdr) – 9 December 1942
- T. Primrose AFC (WgCdr) – 28 June 1943
- R.A. Davison (SqnLdr) – 7 June 1944
- A.C. Neville (SqnLdr) – 6 September 1944
- H.T. Smith (FltLt) – 1 February 1945
