= New Lambton =

- Suburb
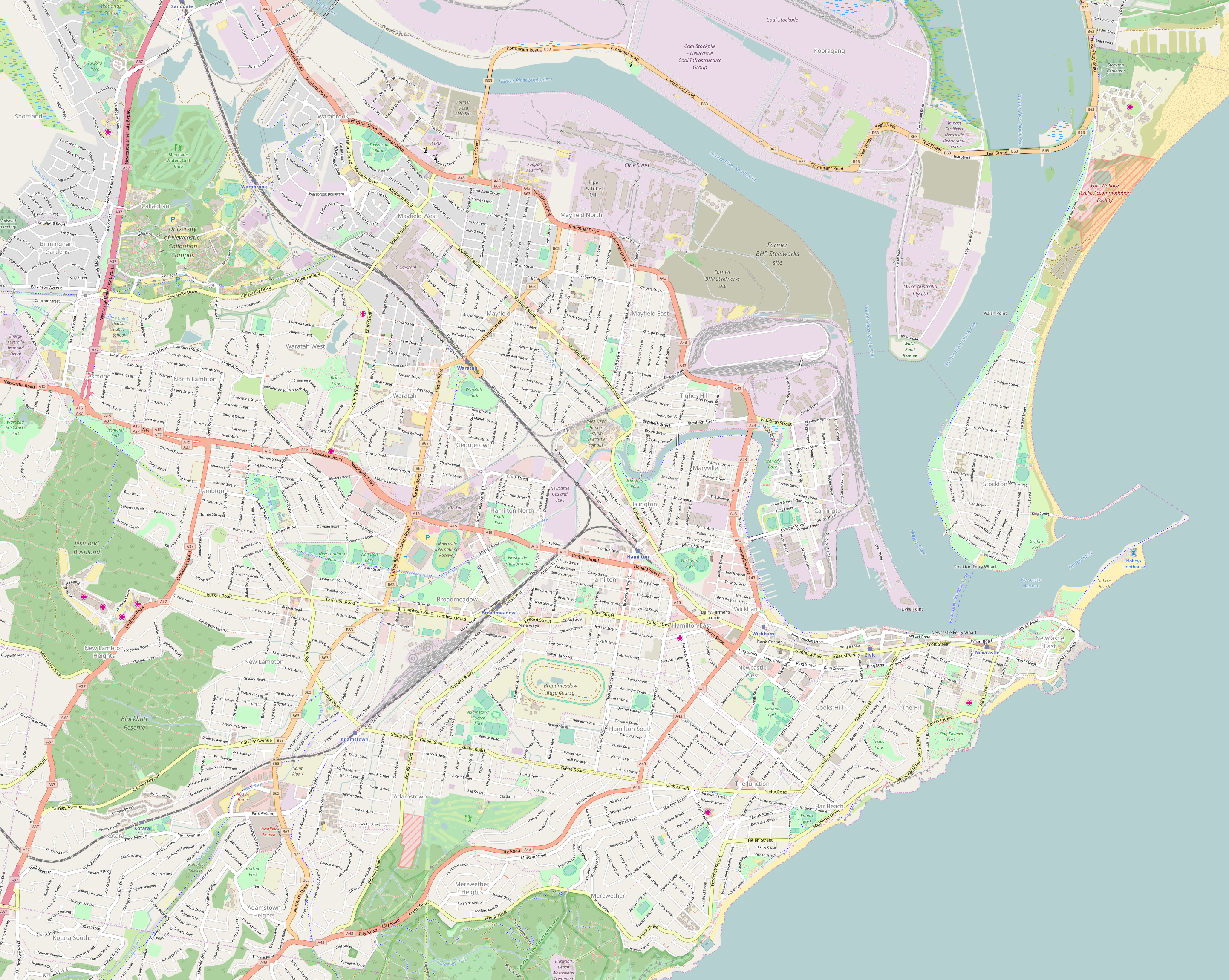
- Interactive map of New Lambton
- Coordinates: 32°55′40″S 151°42′39″E
- Country: Australia
- State: New South Wales
- Region: Hunter
- City: Newcastle
- LGAs: City of Newcastle; City of Lake Macquarie
- Location: 155 km (96 mi) NNE of Sydney; 6 km (3.7 mi) W of Newcastle; 4 km (2.5 mi) NNE of Charlestown; 32 km (20 mi) SE of Maitland; 60 km (37 mi) N of The Entrance

Government
  - State electorates: Wallsend; Charlestown; Newcastle
  - Federal division: Newcastle

Area
  - Total: 5.5 km^{2} (2.1 sq mi)
- Elevation: 29 m (95 ft)

Population
  - Total: 10,651 (SAL 2021)
- Time zone: UTC+10 (AEST)
  - Summer (DST): UTC+11 (AEDT)
- Postcode: 2305
- County: Northumberland
- Parish: Newcastle
- Mean max temp: 21.8 °C (71.2 °F)
- Mean min temp: 14.2 °C (57.6 °F)
- Annual rainfall: 1,134.3 mm (44.66 in)
Suburbs around New Lambton
New Lambton Heights	Lambton	Broadmeadow
New Lambton Heights	New Lambton	Broadmeadow
Kotara	Kotara	Adamstown

New Lambton is a suburb of Newcastle, in the Hunter Region of New South Wales, Australia. It is located about 6 km (4 mi) west of the Newcastle central business district. It includes two shopping districts, schools and other general facilities. At the 2016 Australian census it had a population of approximately 10,000.

Initially a coal mining township, New Lambton later became a municipality until it was eventually incorporated into Greater Newcastle. The suburb, which is primarily residential, includes a 182 ha (450-acre) nature reserve and a major regional sports centre.

== Geography ==
The suburb is irregularly shaped, covering an area of approximately 5.5 km^{2} (2.1 sq mi). While mainly residential in nature, the entire south-western part of the suburb is occupied by Blackbutt Reserve, a 182 ha (450-acre) nature reserve consisting primarily of natural bushland. The east of the suburb is predominantly level and only a few metres above sea level, but rises to approximately 90 m (300 ft) above mean sea level in the western areas, the highest parts of the suburb being in Blackbutt Reserve.

== History ==
The Awabakal and Worimi people were the first to live in Newcastle.

=== Early years ===
New Lambton was originally a coal mining township, with the New Lambton Colliery situated to the east across the railway in what is now Adamstown.

On 8 January 1889 New Lambton was incorporated as a municipality covering 2,560 acres (10 km^{2}).

=== 1901 ===
In 1901 New Lambton had a population of 1,464. The municipal council consisted of the following:

- Mayor – George Errington
- Justice of the Peace
- Town Clerk – Henry J. Noble
- Aldermen – John Williams, Benjamin Bradley, John Butterworth, Charles Dagwell, Richard Lay, Michael Gray, J.P., Joseph Cartright and Alexander Sneddon.

The council derived a considerable revenue from the district's largest mine, the Scottish-Australian Coal Mining Company's Lambton Colliery, managed by the three Croudace brothers, Frank, Thomas, & Sydney, which although closer to Lambton fell within the New Lambton municipality. One of the district's principal thoroughfares today is Croudace Street.

The town was free of debt, and had a telegraph office, council chambers (erected at a cost of £550), the New Lambton Mechanics Institute, a reading room, fire brigade, public school, and "many signs of advancement". The Member for Kahibah in the New South Wales Legislative Assembly, including New Lambton, was Alfred Edden.

=== Later years ===
In 1938 an act of the Parliament of New South Wales created the "City of Greater Newcastle", which incorporated eleven municipalities, including New Lambton, into one local government area.

During World War II, New Lambton Public School was requisitioned by the government and used as No. 2 Fighter Sector Headquarters. In recognition of this, the school was granted permission in 1995 to fly the Royal Australian Air Force Ensign and is the only school in Australia allowed to do so.

New Lambton once had an art deco cinema, The Savoy, now the New Lambton Community Centre.

== Transport ==
New Lambton is bordered by, or crossed by, various arterial roads. Lookout Road, which joins Croudace Road, borders the suburb to the west. To the east, Lambton Road facilitates access to the Newcastle central business district (CBD). To the south, Carnley Avenue and Northcott Drive provide access to the City of Lake Macquarie suburbs. The south-east of the suburb is bordered by the Main North Line, where the suburb is serviced by Adamstown railway station.

== Blackbutt Reserve ==
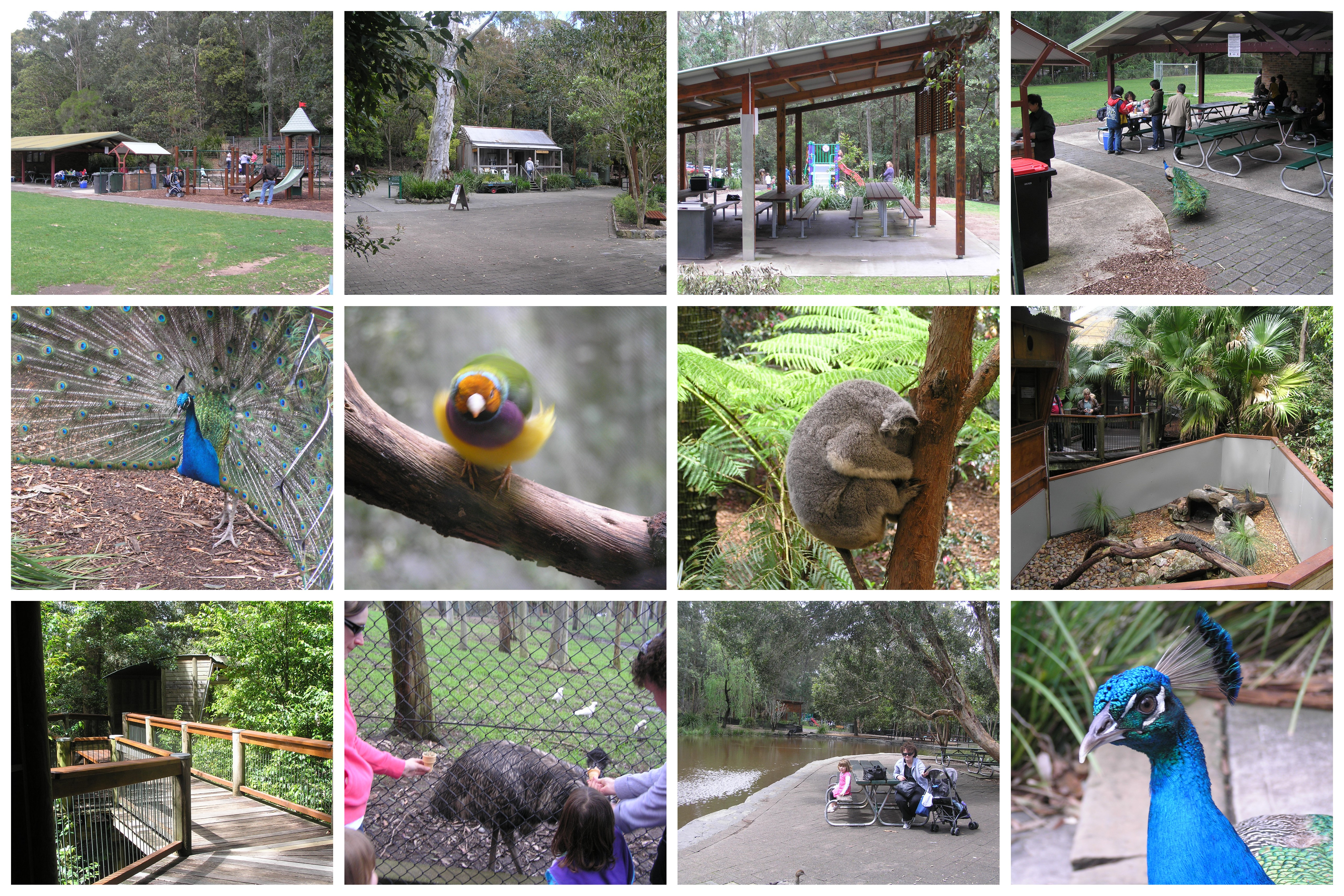
Blackbutt Reserve off Carnley Ave

The entire south-western corner of the suburb is occupied by Blackbutt Reserve. The main entrances of the reserve, in Carnley Avenue and Freyberg Street, are approximately 8.8 km (5.5 mi) by road from the Newcastle CBD. Covering 182 hectares (450 acres), the reserve is mainly urban bushland, and includes nature trails, wildlife exhibits, children's playgrounds and recreational facilities. The reserve, which is administered by the Newcastle City Council, has over 16 km (10 mi) of tracks meandering through open rainforest.

There are four main picnic and recreational areas in the reserve, off different entry points:

- Black Duck Picnic Area, located off Carnley Avenue;
- Richley Reserve Picnic Area, located off Freyberg Street, which was previously the site of the Buchanan Borehole Colliery;
- Dead Tree Picnic Area;
- and Lily Pond Picnic Area, off the corner of Queens Road and Mahogany Drive.

== Sport ==
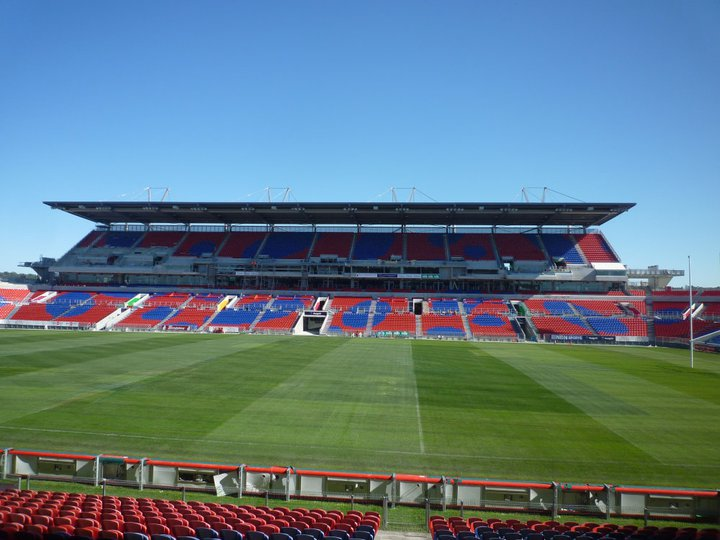
Hunter Stadium, the main stadium at the Newcastle International Sports Centre

New Lambton includes several parks where various sports are played. At the north-eastern corner of the suburb, is the Newcastle International Sports Centre, a venue used by the National Rugby League's Newcastle Knights and the A-League's Newcastle Jets. The suburb is also home to the New Lambton Football Club, the largest football club based on members in Northern NSW and they play games out of Alder Park and Novocastrian Park. New Lambton Football Club traces its origins back to 1896 when Scottish miners from South Lambton first played football, which became an official club in 1917 as returned servicemen came home from the Great War to again work in the mines. Western Suburbs Rugby League and Cricket Club call Harker Oval home.

== Education ==
New Lambton Public is a government co-education primary located on Regent Street. Another government co-educational government school is located on 45 St James Street which is called New Lambton South Public School. There is also a Catholic co-educational primary called St Therese's Primary located on Burke Street.
