= Irene Hall =

Australian hospital matron (1888–1961)

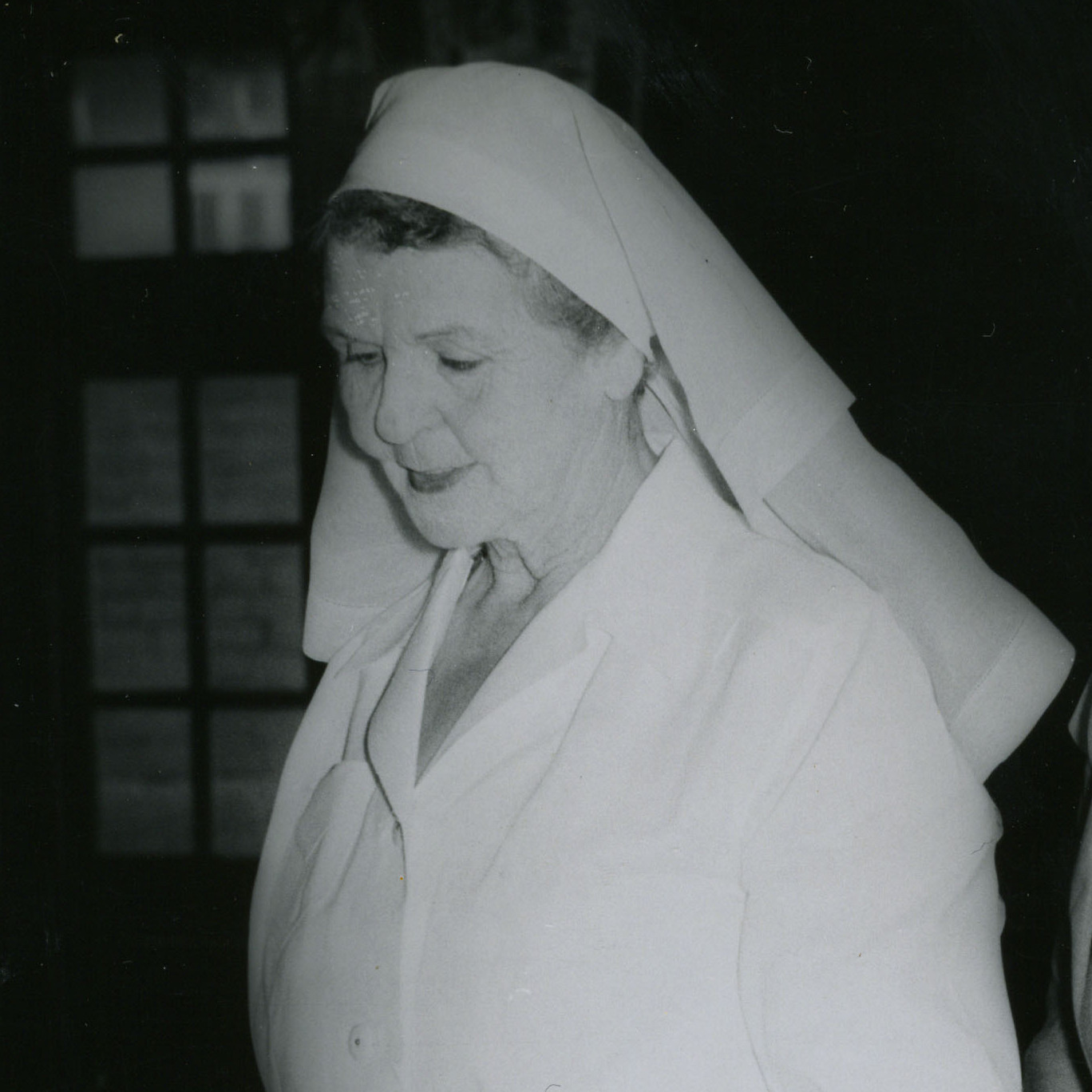
- Born: 19 July 1888; Ryde, Colony of New South Wales
- Died: 11 August 1961 (aged 73); Royal Newcastle Hospital, New South Wales
- Education: Sydney Hospital
- Occupation: hospital matron
- Employer: Royal Newcastle Hospital
- Known for: "synonymous with [her] institution"
- Awards: King George V Silver Jubilee Medal (1935); Queen Elizabeth II Coronation Medal (1953); Member of the Most Excellent Order of the British Empire (1957)

Irene Slater Hall MBE (19 July 1888 – 11 August 1961) was an Australian hospital matron who over 40 years became "synonymous" with the former Royal Newcastle Hospital.

== Biography ==
Hall was born in Ryde, Colony of New South Wales in July 1888. Her Australian born parents were Harriett (born Noakes) and her husband Moses Slater Hall - who worked on a farm. She was educated locally.

Nellie Gould and Sister Julia Bligh Johnston ran the private Ermelo Private Hospital in Dulwich Hill, Sydney. Hall served as a nurse there in 1907 before she began training at Sydney Hospital the following year and completing her training in January 1913.

On 1 December 1914, Hall began work at the Royal Newcastle Hospital taking up the post of deputy matron and in the following year she became the hospital's matron.

She served in the role of the hospital's matron for 43 years and her name was said to be "synonymous with the institution". She kept a rigid discipline with her nurses when they were training. She stated her discipline was more rigorous than the British army. When the Matrons' Handbook of Lectures to Trainees was published in 1935 she was the editor.

She first attended the International Council of Nurses congress in 1937. She later went to the congress in Atlantic City in 1947.

Under the hospital's innovative medical superintendent, Chris McCaffrey, introduced initially unpopular reforms to nursing made with the help of Hall.

In 1957 she attended her last International Council of Nurses congress which was in Rome and she became a Member of the Most Excellent Order of the British Empire.

== Death and legacy ==
She retired in 1958. In 1960 the Royal Newcastle Hospital's Irene Hall Nurses' Home was opened in Newcastle. Hall died in 1961 in the Royal Newcastle Hospital.
