= Glendale, New South Wales =

Glendale Greater Newcastle, New South Wales
- Coordinates: 32°54′54″S 151°39′04″E
- Population: 3,260 (2021 census)
  - Density: 931/km^{2} (2,410/sq mi)
- Postcode(s): 2285
- Elevation: 14 m (46 ft)
- Area: 3.5 km^{2} (1.4 sq mi)
- Location: 15 km (9 mi) W of Newcastle; 152 km (94 mi) N of Sydney; 33 km (21 mi) SE of Maitland; 61 km (38 mi) N of The Entrance; 82 km (51 mi) N of Gosford
- LGA(s): City of Lake Macquarie
- Parish: Kahibah
- State electorate(s): Wallsend
- Federal division(s): Shortland; Newcastle
Suburbs around Glendale:
Edgeworth	Elermore Vale	Rankin Park
Argenton	Glendale	Cardiff Heights
Boolaroo	Cardiff	Cardiff

Glendale is a suburb of the City of Lake Macquarie, New South Wales, Australia, located 15 kilometres (9 mi) west of Newcastle's central business district at the northern tip of Lake Macquarie city.

== Name ==
The name is Scottish in origin – "glen" (gleann) is a Scottish term for a valley between hills, and "dale", also usually meaning a valley.

== Transport ==
Relative to other areas in Greater Newcastle, Glendale is well serviced by public transport and is adjacent to, but not directly connected to, the Cardiff industrial estate, which is the largest industrial estate in the Lower Hunter region. The railway line presently separates the industrial estate from Glendale. The suburb is home to the proposed Lake Macquarie Transport Interchange, which is partly currently under construction.

== Education ==
- Major campus of Hunter TAFE
- Glendale Technology High School
- Glendale East Public School
- Holy Cross Primary School

== History ==
The Aboriginal people, in this area, the Awabakal, were the first people of this land.

== Commercial area ==
The commercial area of Glendale is situated along Lake Road and Main Road featuring fast food outlets, petrol stations, and numerous shops. Stockland Glendale is a shopping centre just off Lake Road.
