= Royal Newcastle Hospital =

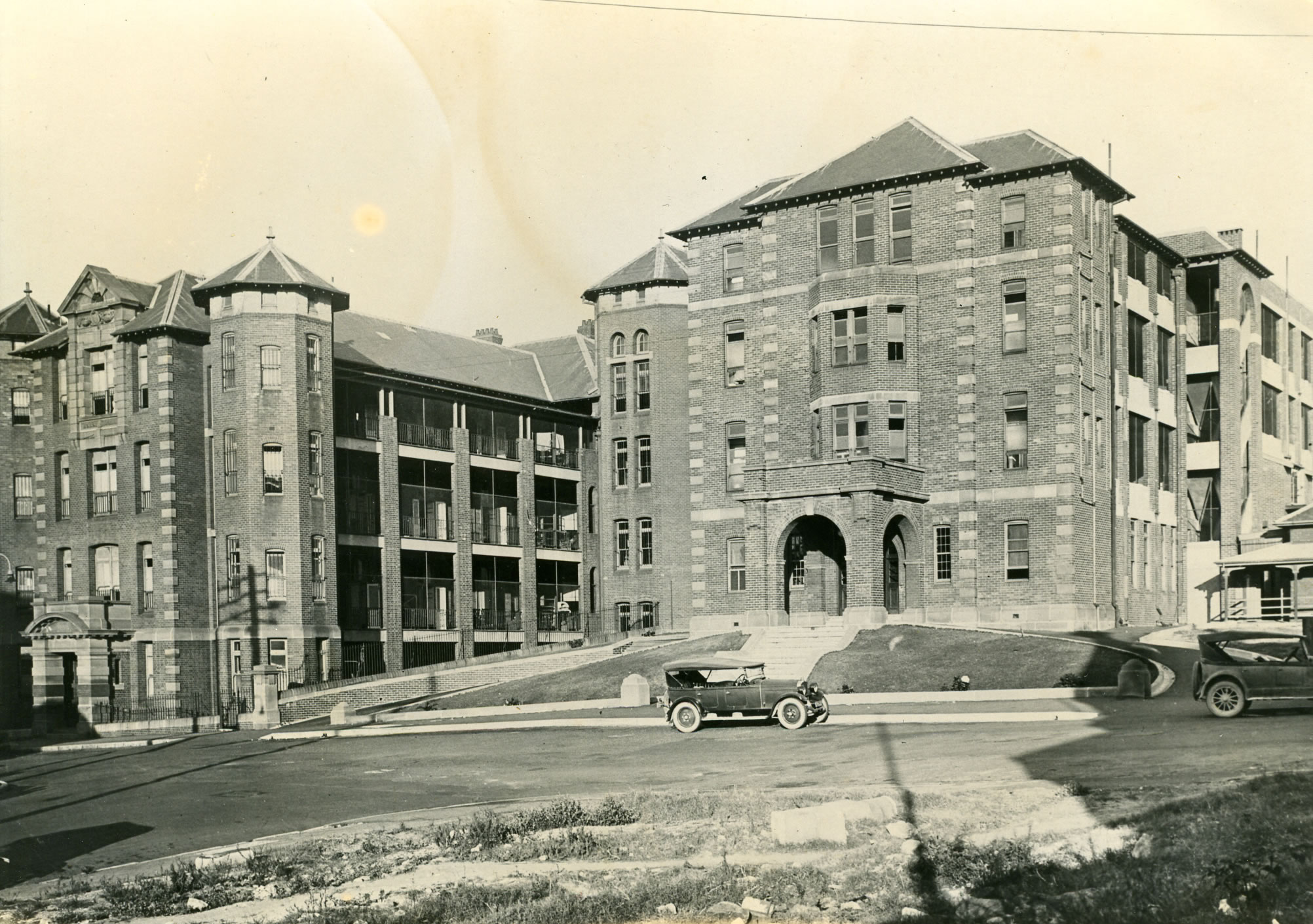
- In the 1900s

Geography
- Location: Newcastle, New South Wales, Australia
- Coordinates: 32°55′46.3″S 151°47′6.7″E

Organisation
- Care system: Public Medicare (AU)
- Type: District General

Services
- Emergency department: Yes (Before closure)

History
- Founded: 1817
- Closed: 2007

Links
- Lists: Hospitals in Australia

The Royal Newcastle Hospital was, for nearly 190 years, the main hospital in the Australian city of Newcastle. The hospital stood on a hill overlooking the Pacific Ocean and the Hunter River port of Newcastle, New South Wales, from 1817 until 2007.

== History ==
The hospital grew in step with Newcastle from its founding as a penal settlement and coal port. The first hospital on the site was built by and for convicts. They were followed by generations of patients, staff and supporters who were involved with an expanding seaport hospital and its many campuses. The hospital in turn had a powerful influence on the East End of central Newcastle and portside communities and on people's wellbeing throughout the Hunter Valley.

In 1915 Irene Slater Hall became the hospital's matron. She served for 43 years and her name was said to be "synonymous with the institution". She kept a rigid discipline of her nurses when they were training which she said was more rigorous than the British army. When the Matrons' Handbook of Lectures to Trainees was published in 1935 she was the editor.

During the mid to late twentieth century, under medical superintendent, Chris McCaffrey, the hospital became a centre for innovation in Australian healthcare, introducing reforms to nursing with Matron Hall and in specialist medical care and records keeping.

By 2007, the year it closed, the Royal Newcastle was one of the oldest, largest and best-known hospitals in Australia. Redevelopment of the hospital site began in 2008 and, with the exception of the North Wing (opened in 1915) and the nurses' homes, much of the site was replaced by an apartment precinct called The Royal designed by Alexander Tzannes. The hospital re-opened in the Royal Newcastle Centre at the site of the John Hunter Hospital in New Lambton Heights.

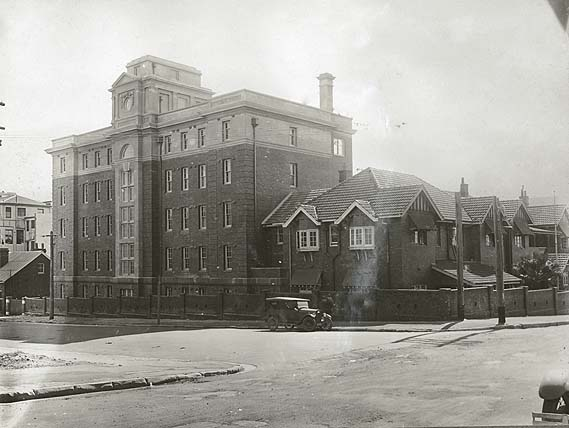
Nurses Quarters
