= Charlestown Square =

- Location: Charlestown, New South Wales, Australia
- Coordinates: 32°57′51″S 151°41′38″E
- Address: 30 Pearson Street, Charlestown NSW 2290
- Opened: 27 March 1979
- Manager: GPT Group
- Owner: GPT Group
- Num. of stores: 285
- Num. of anchor tenants: 7
- Floor area: 93,400 m^{2} (1,005,349 sq ft)
- Floors: 3
- Parking: 2,254 spaces
- Website: www.charlestownsquare.com.au

Charlestown Square is a large indoor/outdoor shopping centre in the suburb of Charlestown in the City of Lake Macquarie in New South Wales, Australia.

== History ==
Charlestown Square opened on 27 March 1979 as a two level centre and featured Kmart, Coles and 50 speciality stores. The centre underwent significant investment in extensions and modifications. The upgrades occurred in 1983 and in 1989 which added a Grace Bros department store and the first modern food court known as ‘Charlie's Magic Eatery’. It also went through upgrades in 1996 and 2000.

Kmart closed its store in August 2004 and relocated to the expansion of Stockland Glendale. The Kmart store was later replaced by Target.

Charlestown Square commenced the $470 million expansion after obtaining support from Lake Macquarie City Council in January 2008. A number of people have been opposed to the expansion, including local member of parliament Matthew Morris.

The redevelopment was completed in October 2010 and featured 110 new specialty shops including Rebel Sport and JB Hi-Fi. An entertainment precinct also opened featuring eight screen Reading Cinemas complex (which holds two Gold Lounge cinemas), Strike Bowling Bar and restaurants. Reading Cinemas officially opened on 21 October 2010.

A further expansion in 2015 saw Charlestown Square undergo a major redevelopment in a section of the centre known best for the former residency of Best & Less. This development meant the closure of 34 retailers during construction but brought major international retailers such as H&M and Mecca to the centre.

German supermarket Aldi also opened within the centre on 29 June 2016. H&M opened at Charlestown Square on 14 July 2016 along with a flagship Cotton On store.

Charlestown Square planned its $4.6 million redevelopment featuring new bars and cafes in the expansion. On 5 December 2019 Charlestown Square opened its new dining precinct known as 'The Corner', which featured six new contemporary restaurants. Around that time a renovated Timezone opened.

Target closed its store in November 2025 and has since been replaced by Kmart.

== Tenants ==
Charlestown Square has 93,400 m^{2} of floor space. The major retailers include Myer, Big W, Kmart, Aldi, Coles, Woolworths, Cotton On, H&M, Apple, JB Hi-Fi, Rebel, Timezone, Holey Moley, Strike Bowling Bar and Reading Cinemas.

== Transport ==
Charlestown Square has bus connections to City of Lake Macquarie suburbs and Newcastle suburbs, as well as local surrounding suburbs. It is served by Newcastle Transport, Hunter Valley Buses and limited services operated by Busways.

Charlestown Square has multi level car parks with 2,254 spaces.

== Incidents ==
- On 14 February 2015, a 42-year-old father and his 13-year-old daughter were assaulted by gangs of youths outside the cinema complex. The pair attempted to leave the centre through an external set of stairs, only to be confronted by a gang of screaming, swearing youths. The man was dragged on to the ground and beaten, suffering suspected broken ribs and cuts to his face, hands and feet. The youths also stole his phone, wallet and car keys. A 15-year-old boy was arrested over the incident and was dealt with under the Young Offenders Act.
- On 28 February 2018, a 22-year-old man was arrested by police over a domestic violence incident. However, during the arrest the man stabbed himself several times as officers went to arrest him. He was then tasered by police in an effort to stop him from stabbing himself but he lost consciousness. He was then resuscitated before paramedics arrived and rushed him to hospital in a critical condition. This incident occurred around 1pm outside a liquor store.
- On 24 March 2020, a 52-year-old woman verbally abused and threatened a 46-year-old male employee of the supermarket before punching him in the chest and spitting in his face. A 33-year-old male security guard intercepted the woman and she verbally abused and slapped him. Police arrived a short time later and arrested her. Officers were told the woman was previously banned from the store after a verbal altercation with staff over previous the weekend. This incident occurred around 5pm.
- On 10 July 2023, it is alleged a 33-year-old person threatened bakery staff with a syringe. Police conducted inquiries and arrested a man on South Street, Windale. The man was taken to Belmont Police Station and was charged with robbery armed with offensive weapon. He was refused bail and due to face Newcastle Local Court on 11 July 2023.
