= Cardiff railway station, New South Wales =

Railway station in New South Wales, Australia

Cardiff
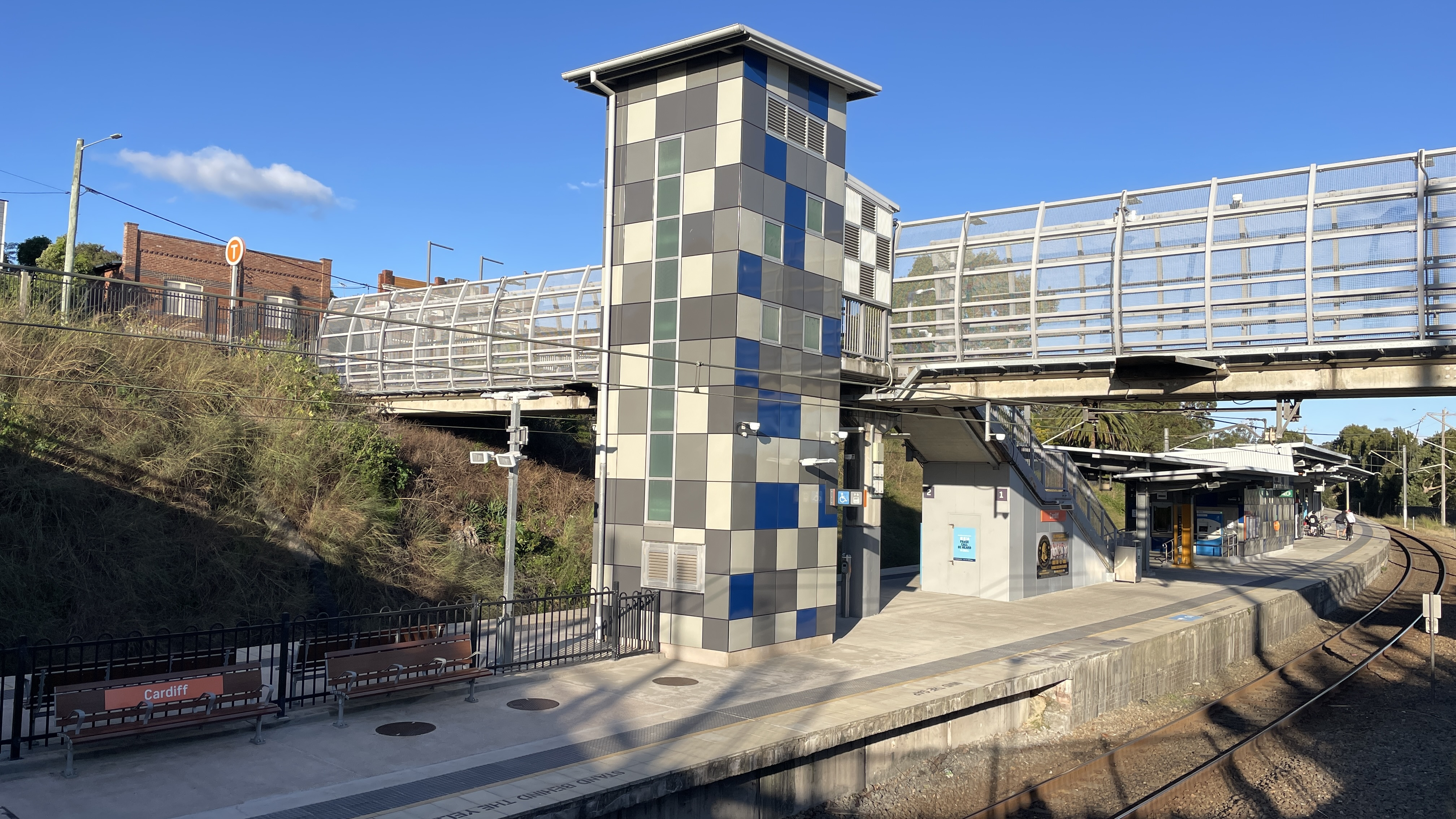
- Northbound view to the island platform, June 2025

General information
- Location: Main Road, Cardiff; Australia
- Coordinates: 32°56′30″S 151°39′46″E
- Owner: Transport Asset Manager of New South Wales
- Operator: Sydney Trains
- Line: Main Northern
- Distance: 155.08 km (96.36 mi) from Central
- Platforms: 2 (1 island)
- Tracks: 2
- Connections: Bus

Construction
- Structure type: Ground
- Accessible: Yes

Other information
- Status: Weekdays: Staffed: 4am to 8pm: Weekends and public holidays: Staffed: 5am to 8.30pm
- Station code: CDF
- Website: Transport for NSW

History
- Opened: 14 March 1889; 137 years ago
- Rebuilt: 8 June 1902

Passengers
- 2025: 474,765 (year); 1,301 (daily) (Sydney Trains, NSW TrainLink)

Services
Preceding station	Intercity Trains	Following station
Kotara towards Newcastle Interchange	Central Coast & Newcastle Line	Cockle Creek towards Central
Broadmeadow towards Newcastle Interchange	Central Coast & Newcastle Line Express	Fassifern towards Central
Location

Cardiff railway station is located on the Main Northern line in New South Wales, Australia. It serves the western Newcastle suburb of Cardiff, opening on 14 March 1889, relocating to its present site on 8 June 1902.

Despite being one of the busiest stations in the region, the station long had substandard facilities, in particular, a lack of disabled access. There had been numerous (often contradictory) proposals to either upgrade Cardiff or relocate the station to the abandoned station at nearby Glendale, following community pressure stretching back to the 1990s.

In November 2010, work started on a series of upgrades. These improved the parking and stairs and provided wheelchair access, weather protection, and a lengthened platform capable of accommodating eight carriage trains.

== Platforms and services ==
Cardiff has one island platform with two faces. It is serviced by Sydney Trains Intercity Central Coast & Newcastle Line services travelling between Sydney Central, Gosford and Newcastle.

Platform	Line	Stopping pattern	Notes
1	Central Coast & Newcastle Line	Services to Gosford & Sydney Central	
2	Central Coast & Newcastle Line	Services to Newcastle	

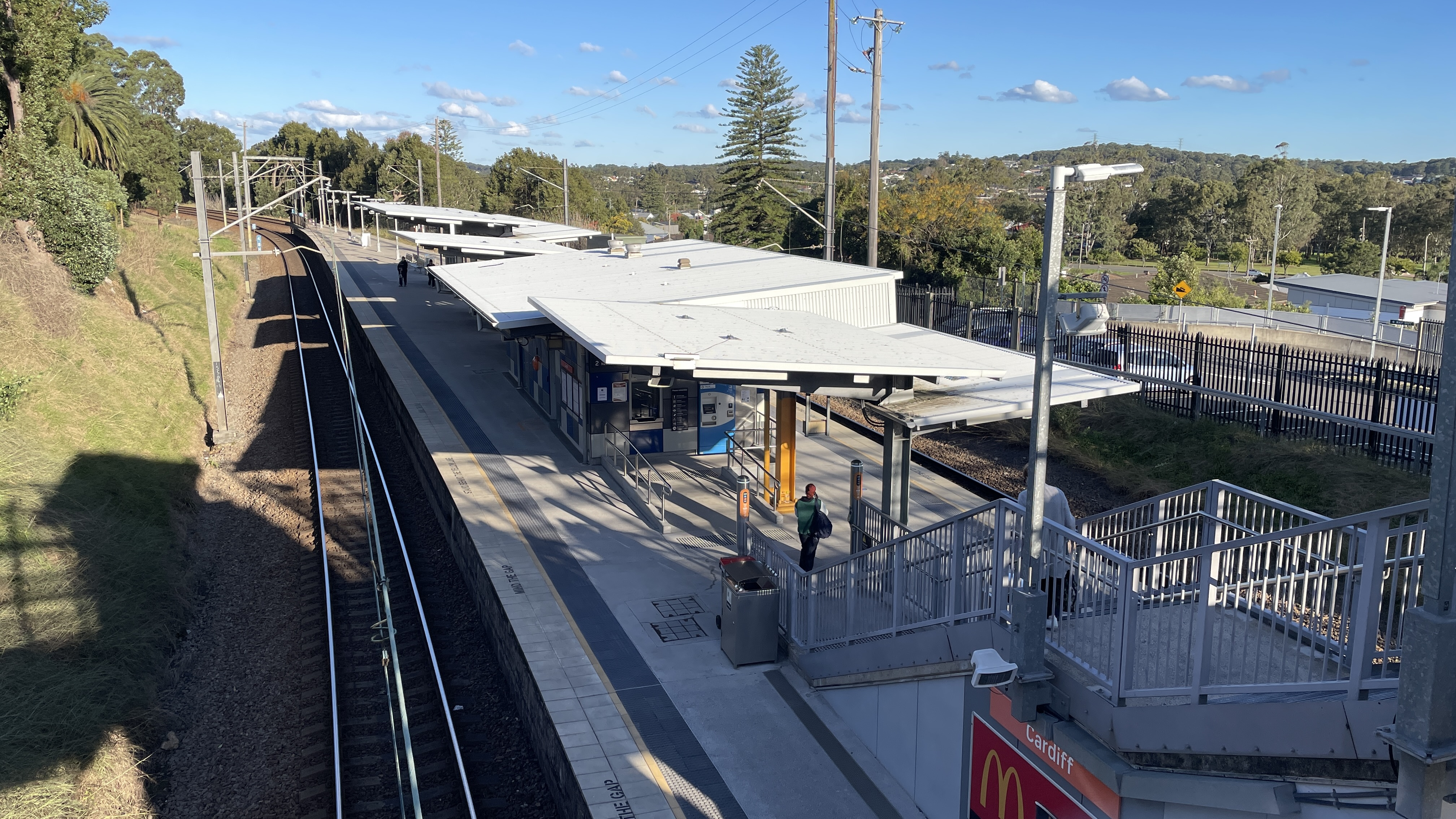
Northbound view from footbridge

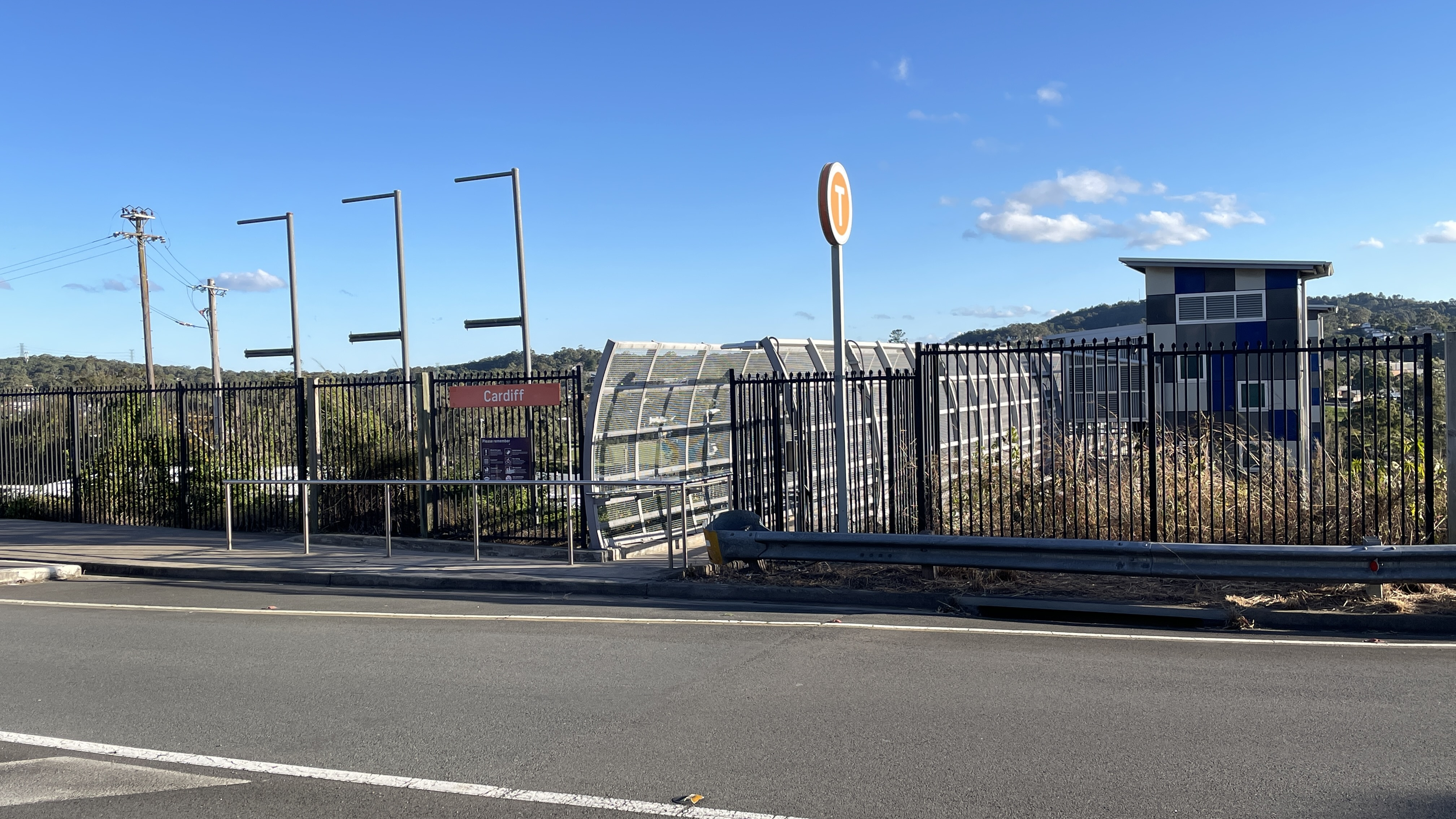
Entrance on Railway Parade

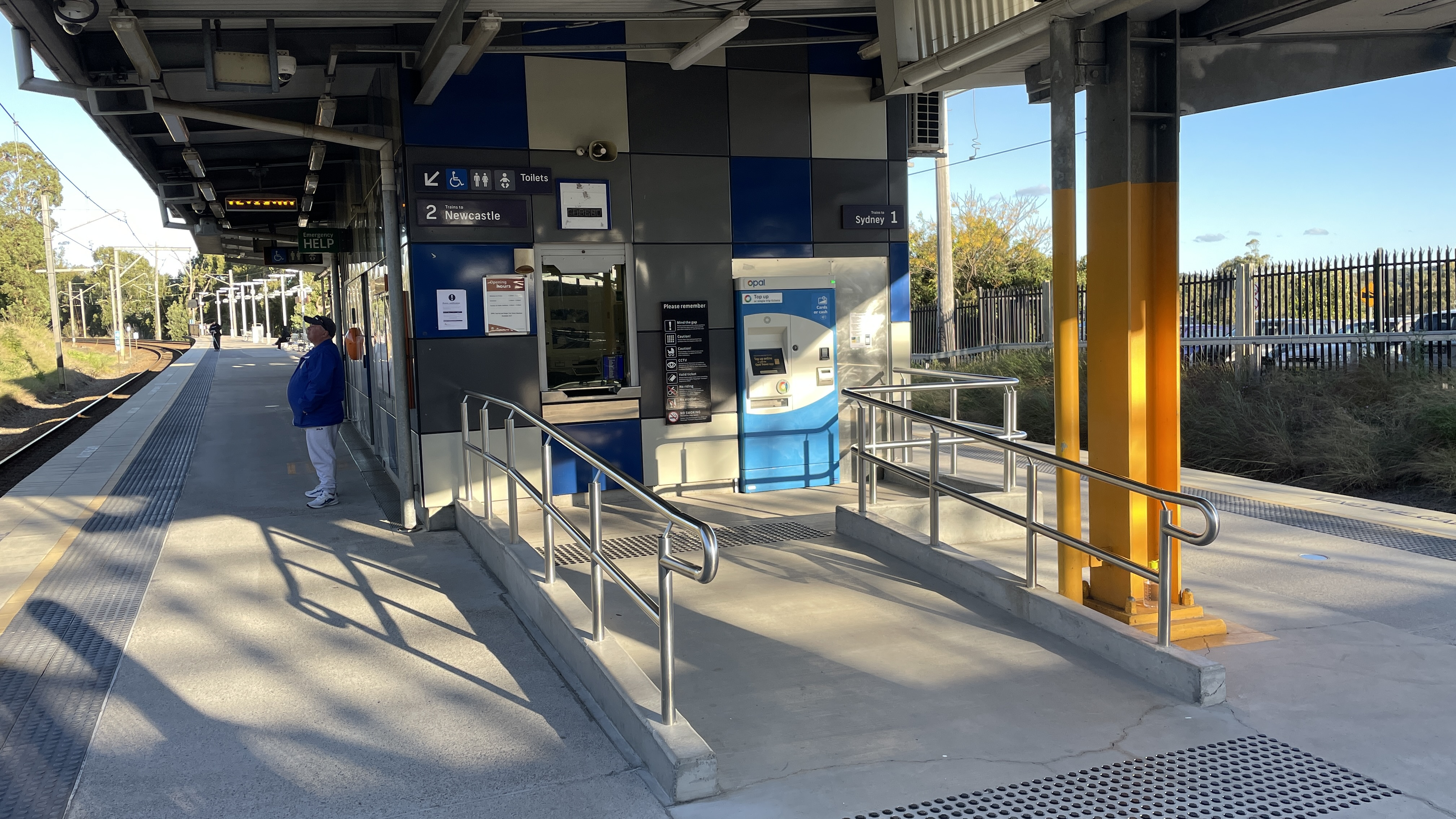
Station office

== Transport links ==
Hunter Valley Buses operates five bus routes via Cardiff station, under contract to Transport for NSW:

- 259: Glendale to Minmi via Wallsend & Maryland
- 262: Cameron Park to Charlestown via Constitution Dr
- 263: Cameron Park to Charlestown
- 264: Minmi to Adamstown via Glendale & Kotara
- 267: West Wallsend to Glendale

Newcastle Transport operates three bus routes via Cardiff station, under contract to Transport for NSW:

- 13: Glendale to Newcastle via Cardiff & John Hunter Hospital
- 29: Glendale to Swansea North via Cardiff & Belmont
- 44: Warners Bay to Kotara via Glendale, Cardiff & Macquarie Hills
