= Rankin Park =

- Suburb
- Coordinates: 32°55′55″S 151°40′05″E
- Country: Australia
- State: New South Wales
- City: Newcastle
- LGAs: City of Lake Macquarie; City of Newcastle
- Location: 11 km (6.8 mi) W of Newcastle

Government
  - State electorate: Wallsend
  - Federal division: Newcastle

Area
  - Total: 1.4 km^{2} (0.54 sq mi)
- Postcode: 2287
- Parish: Newcastle
Suburbs around Rankin Park
	Elermore Vale
Cardiff Heights	Rankin Park	New Lambton Heights
	New Lambton Heights

Rankin Park (/ˈreɪnkɪn/) is a suburb of Newcastle, New South Wales, Australia, located 11 kilometres (7 mi) west of Newcastle's central business district. It is split between the City of Lake Macquarie and City of Newcastle local government areas.

The Aboriginal people, in this area, the Awabakal, were the first people of this land.

The suburb began as a housing estate named Cambridge Hills Estate. The local preschool on McCaffrey Drive, formerly a sales office for the estate, retains the former estate's name.

The east of the suburb contains George McGregor Park, a 19.66-hectare (48.58-acre) bushland reserve named after the late, former South Wallsend Progress Association member, George McGregor, managed by the City of Newcastle.
