= New Lambton Heights =

- Suburb
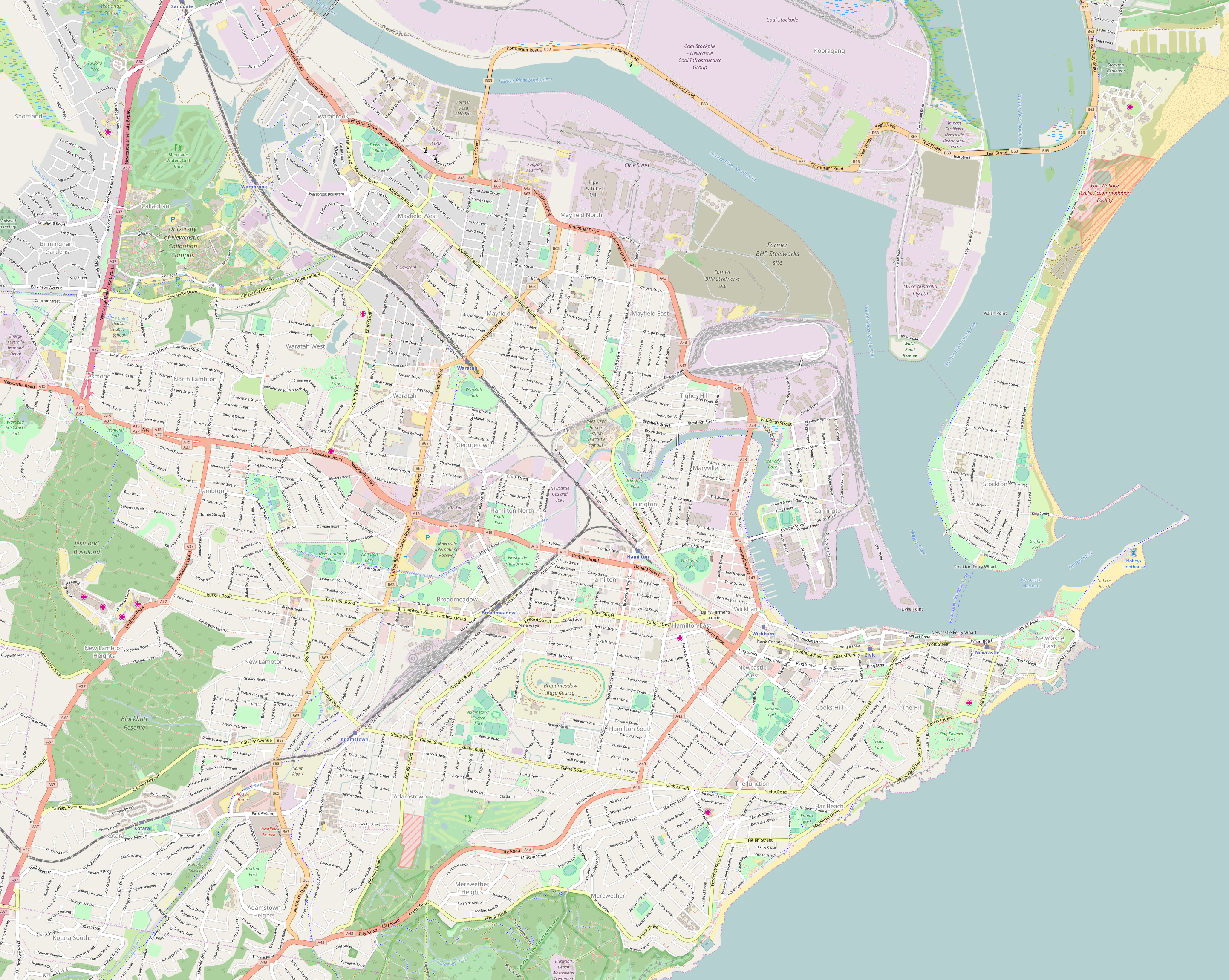
- Coordinates: 32°54′54″S 151°42′04″E
- Country: Australia
- State: New South Wales
- City: Newcastle
- LGAs: City of Lake Macquarie; City of Newcastle
- Location: 9 km (5.6 mi) W of Newcastle; 31 km (19 mi) SE of Maitland; 58 km (36 mi) N of The Entrance; 84 km (52 mi) NNE of Gosford; 150 km (93 mi) NNE of Sydney

Government
  - State electorate: Wallsend
  - Federal divisions: Newcastle; Shortland

Area
  - Total: 2.7 km^{2} (1.0 sq mi)
- Elevation: 105 m (344 ft)
- Postcode: 2305
- Parish: Newcastle
Suburbs around New Lambton Heights
Rankin Park	Lambton	Lambton
Cardiff Heights	New Lambton Heights	New Lambton
Cardiff Heights	Cardiff Heights	Kotara

New Lambton Heights is a suburb of Newcastle, New South Wales, Australia, located 9 kilometres (6 mi) west of Newcastle's central business district. It is split between the City of Lake Macquarie and City of Newcastle local government areas.

The Aboriginal people, in this area, the Awabakal, were the first people of this land.

The suburb is the location of a major hospital complex that includes the John Hunter, John Hunter Children's, Rankin Park and Newcastle Private hospitals, and the Royal Newcastle Centre, which was previously known as the Royal Newcastle Hospital before it moved from its original site near Newcastle Beach. Also in the suburb are water reservoirs, a primary school and several small bushland reserves. It is largely populated by doctors and other hospital staff, and hence is generally regarded within the higher end of Newcastle's socio-economic scale, along with suburbs such as Merewether Heights.

The suburb is very leafy with established native trees. Parts of the suburb border the Blackbutt Nature Reserve, which is a large native bushland park maintained by the City of Newcastle. The park, sometimes called the lungs of the city, includes hiking trails, picnicking areas, and a native animal enclosure which houses kangaroos, wallabies, koalas, wombats, emus and native birds. The suburb contains one school; New Lambton Heights Infants School, (public school) which is one of Newcastle's best starter schools. New Lambton, the neighbouring suburb to the east, has a well regarded primary school. New Lambton also contains good suburban shopping with boutiques, cafes, gift shops, a supermarket and services such as post office, medical, banks etc. The suburb is also located close to Westfield Kotara, a large shopping mall to the south east.

== Croudace House ==
It was built in 1863 as a residence for Thomas Croudace and his family. In 1888 Grand Duke Alexander Mikhailovich visited the property. In 1920s Royal Newcastle Hospital purchased the property. During WWII an emergency hospital and accommodation for nurses were erected on the property. After the war was called Rankin Park 'Chest' hospital used to treat tuberculosis patients. In 1960s and 1970 was used to accommodate unwed pregnant women. It become dilapidated in the 1980s and repaired during the 1990s. It is currently being used as consulting rooms for cardiologist Dr Malcolm Barlow
