= Kotara =

- Suburb
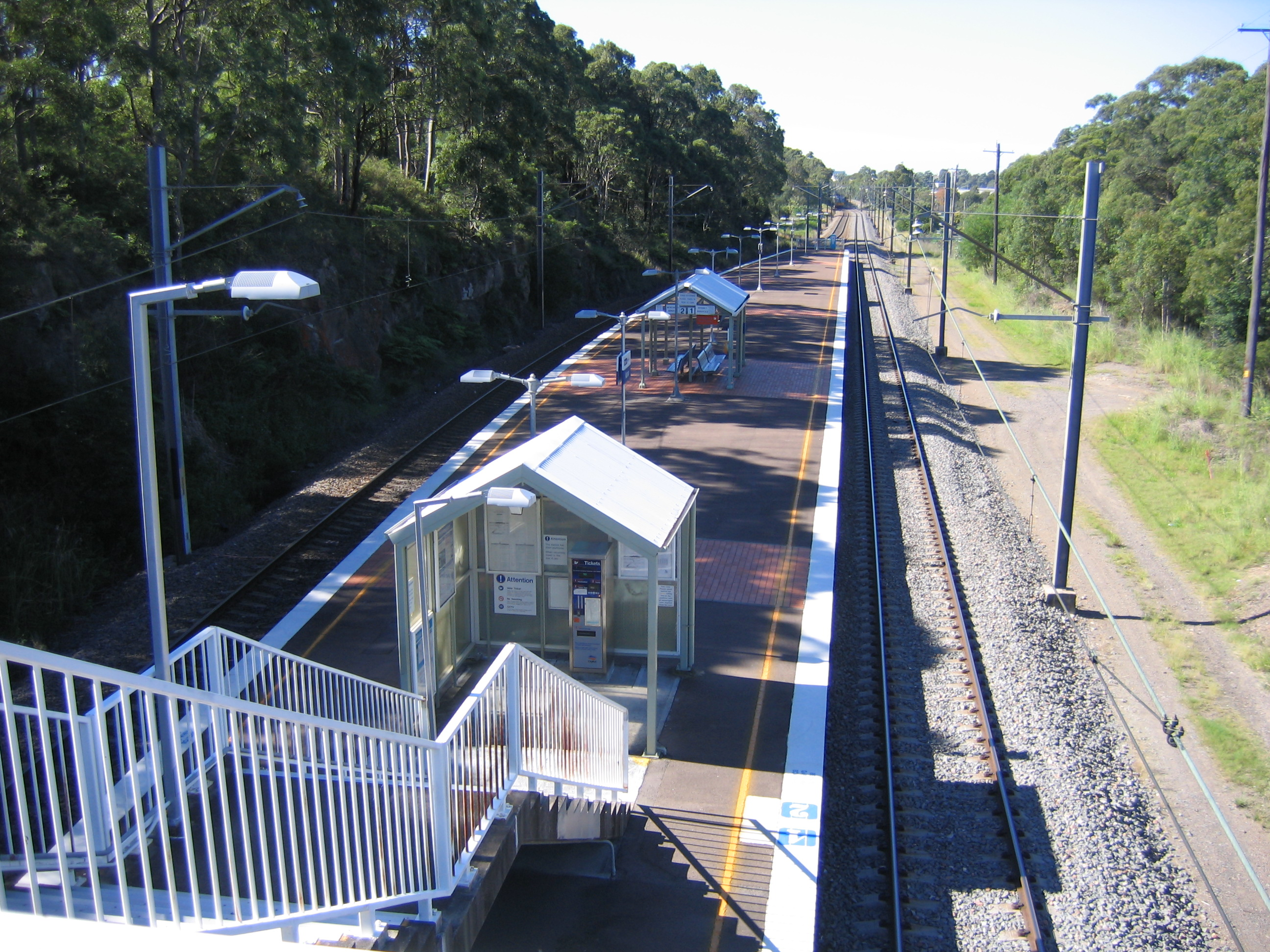
- Kotara railway station

- Interactive map of Kotara
- Coordinates: 32°55′55″S 151°41′06″E
- Country: Australia
- State: New South Wales
- City: Newcastle
- LGAs: City of Newcastle; City of Lake Macquarie
- Location: 9 km (5.6 mi) WSW of Newcastle; 4 km (2.5 mi) N of Charlestown; 80 km (50 mi) NNE of Gosford; 57 km (35 mi) NNE of The Entrance; 152 km (94 mi) NNE of Sydney

Government
  - State electorate: Charlestown
  - Federal divisions: Shortland; Newcastle

Area
  - Total: 2.4 km^{2} (0.93 sq mi)
- Elevation: 26 m (85 ft)

Population
  - Total: 3,980 (SAL 2021)
- Postcode: 2289
- Parish: Newcastle
Suburbs around Kotara
New Lambton Heights	New Lambton	New Lambton
Garden Suburb	Kotara	Adamstown
Garden Suburb	Kotara South	Adamstown Heights

Kotara (/kətɑːrə/ kə-TAR-ə) is a suburb of Newcastle, New South Wales, Australia, located 9 kilometres (6 mi) from Newcastle's central business district. It is split between the City of Newcastle and City of Lake Macquarie local government areas. Kotara is known as one of Newcastle's largest retail destinations.

== History ==
The Aboriginal people, in this area, the Awabakal, were the first people of this land.

In the late 19th century the Australasia Coal Company operated a mine near Kotara, in the valley below the present-day northern entrance to Tickhole Tunnel. A private railway connected the screens with the Government line near the present-day triangle junctions north of Broadmeadow. Surveying for the line commenced in 1875 and the line was completed in April 1877. However, only a total of 9,052 tons was ever produced and the company went into liquidation in June 1879.

It was originally designed to create a 'garden suburb' with high quality and quickly grew in population after 1947.

== Population ==
In the 2021 census, there were 3,980 people in Kotara. 84.8% of people were born in Australia and 89.6% of people spoke only English at home. The most common responses for religion were No Religion 47.0%, Catholic 19.9%, Anglican 12.4% and Uniting Church 3.6%.

== Commercial area ==
Kotara is a large retail centre of Newcastle.

Westfield Kotara (previously known as Garden City and Kotara Fair) is a large shopping centre on Northcott Drive. Across the road from Westfield is the Kotara Home Centre, consisting of big box department stores and food outlets.

== Education ==
Kotara is home to Kotara South Public School on Rodway Parade and the local Catholic School St James Primary School, located on Vista Parade.

== See also ==
- Kotara railway station
