= Kotara railway station =

Railway station in New South Wales, Australia

Kotara
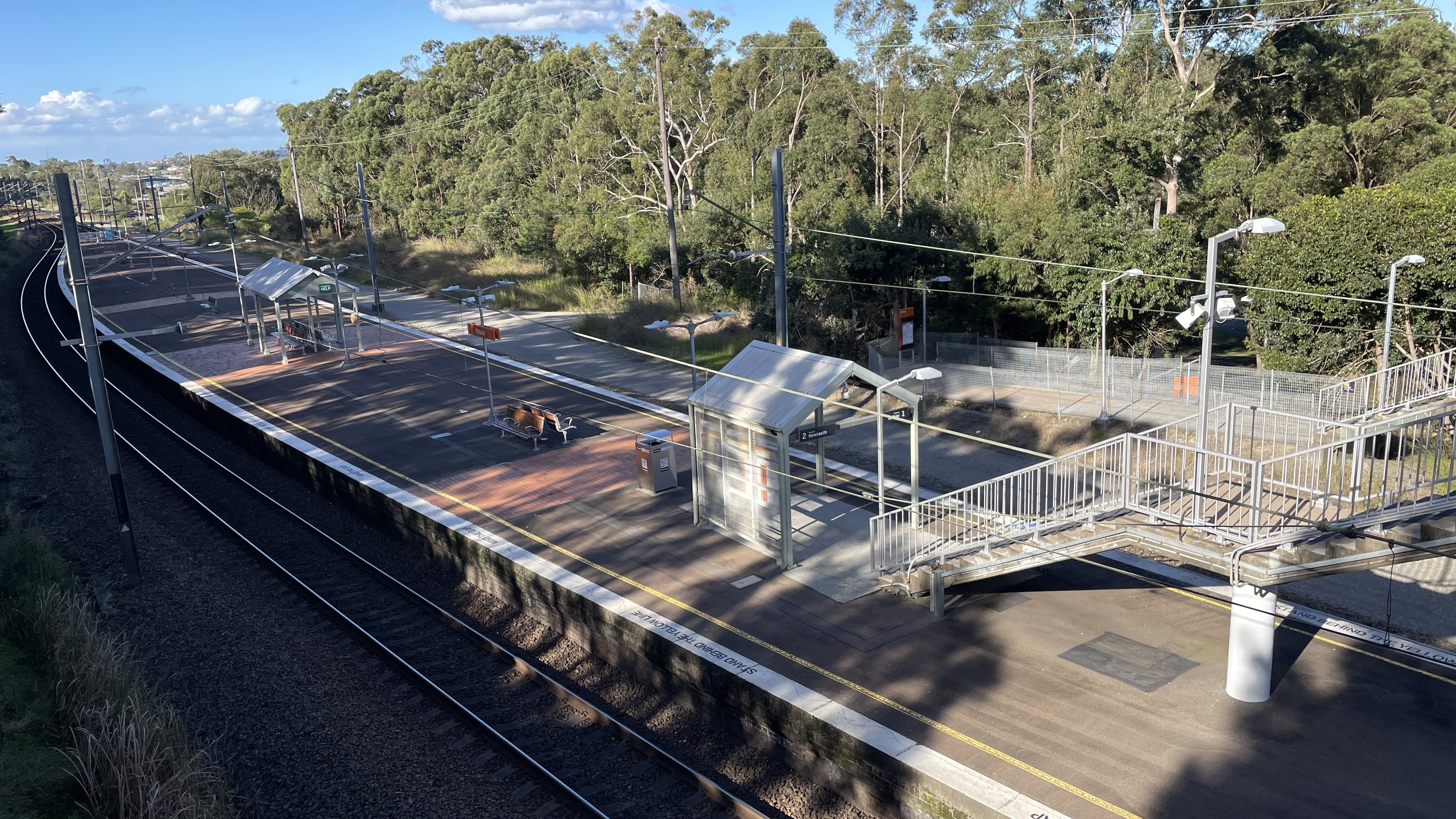
- Northbound view of the station platforms, June 2025

General information
- Location: Park Avenue, Kotara; Australia
- Coordinates: 32°56′29″S 151°41′54″E
- Owner: Transport Asset Manager of New South Wales
- Operator: Sydney Trains
- Line: Main Northern
- Distance: 158.92 km (98.75 mi) from Central
- Platforms: 2 (1 island)
- Tracks: 2
- Connections: Bus

Construction
- Structure type: Ground
- Accessible: No

Other information
- Station code: KRZ
- Website: Transport for NSW

History
- Opened: 12 November 1924; 101 years ago
- Electrified: May 1984

Passengers
- 2025: 32,824 (year); 90 (daily) (Sydney Trains, NSW TrainLink)

Services
Preceding station	Intercity Trains	Following station
Adamstown towards Newcastle Interchange	Central Coast & Newcastle Line	Cardiff towards Central
Location

Kotara railway station is located on the Main Northern line in New South Wales, Australia. It serves the southern Newcastle suburb of Kotara, opening on 12 November 1924.

The station is currently inaccessible for people with visual impairments or mobility difficulties, and along with Cockle Creek railway station, planned upgrades for the station to improve accessibility were announced in June 2024.

The station was lit with kerosene lamps when many other stations and the surrounding area were lit with electricity, due to the cost of wiring the station and the prioritisation of resources for World War II. After campaigning from the community the addition of electric lights at the station were completed in May 1941.

== Platforms and services ==
Kotara has one island platform with two faces. It is serviced by Sydney Trains Intercity Central Coast & Newcastle Line services travelling between Sydney Central, Gosford and Newcastle.

Platform	Line	Stopping pattern	Notes
1	CCN	Services to Gosford & Sydney Central	
2	CCN	Services to Newcastle	

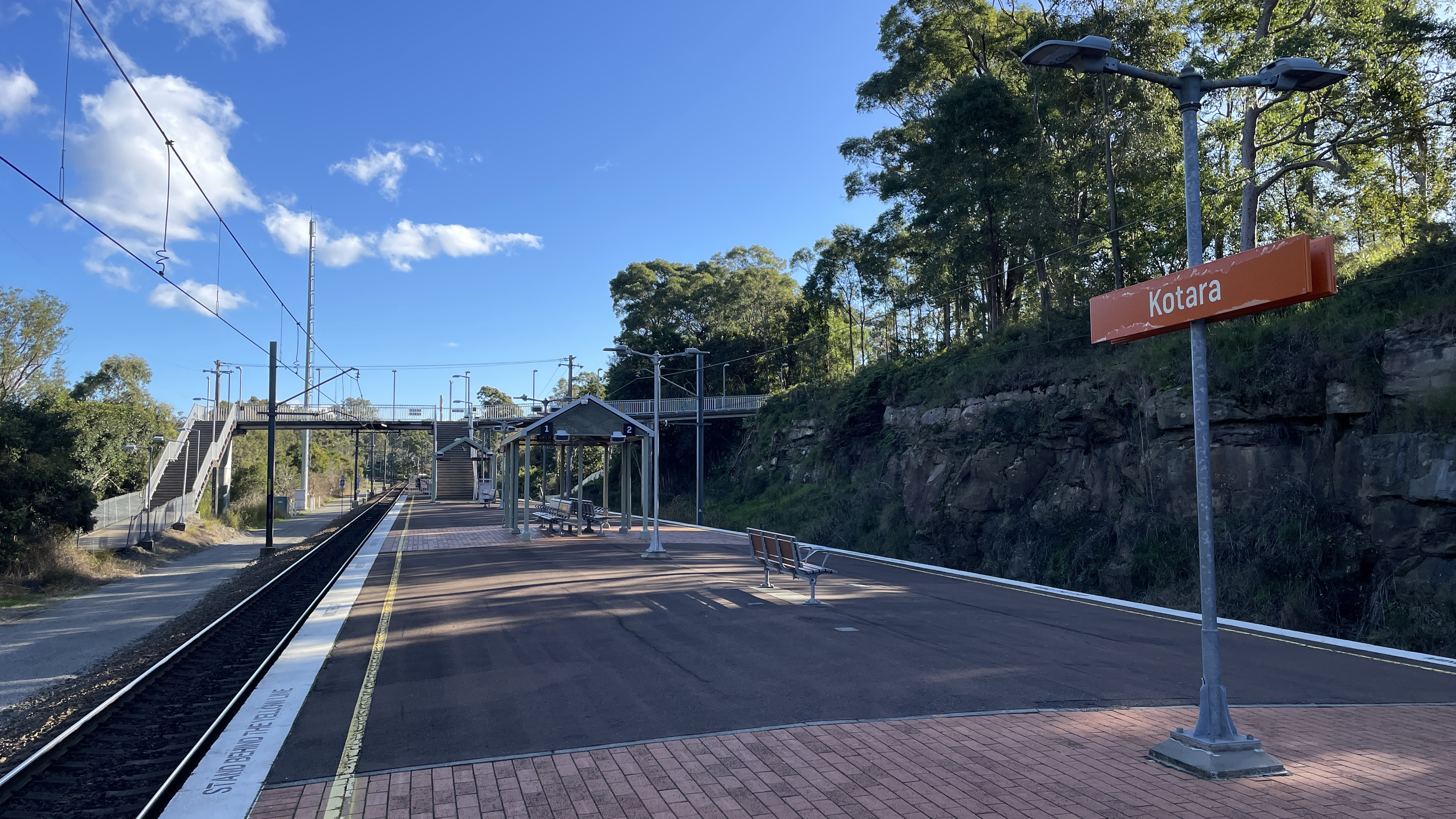
Southbound view from the island platform

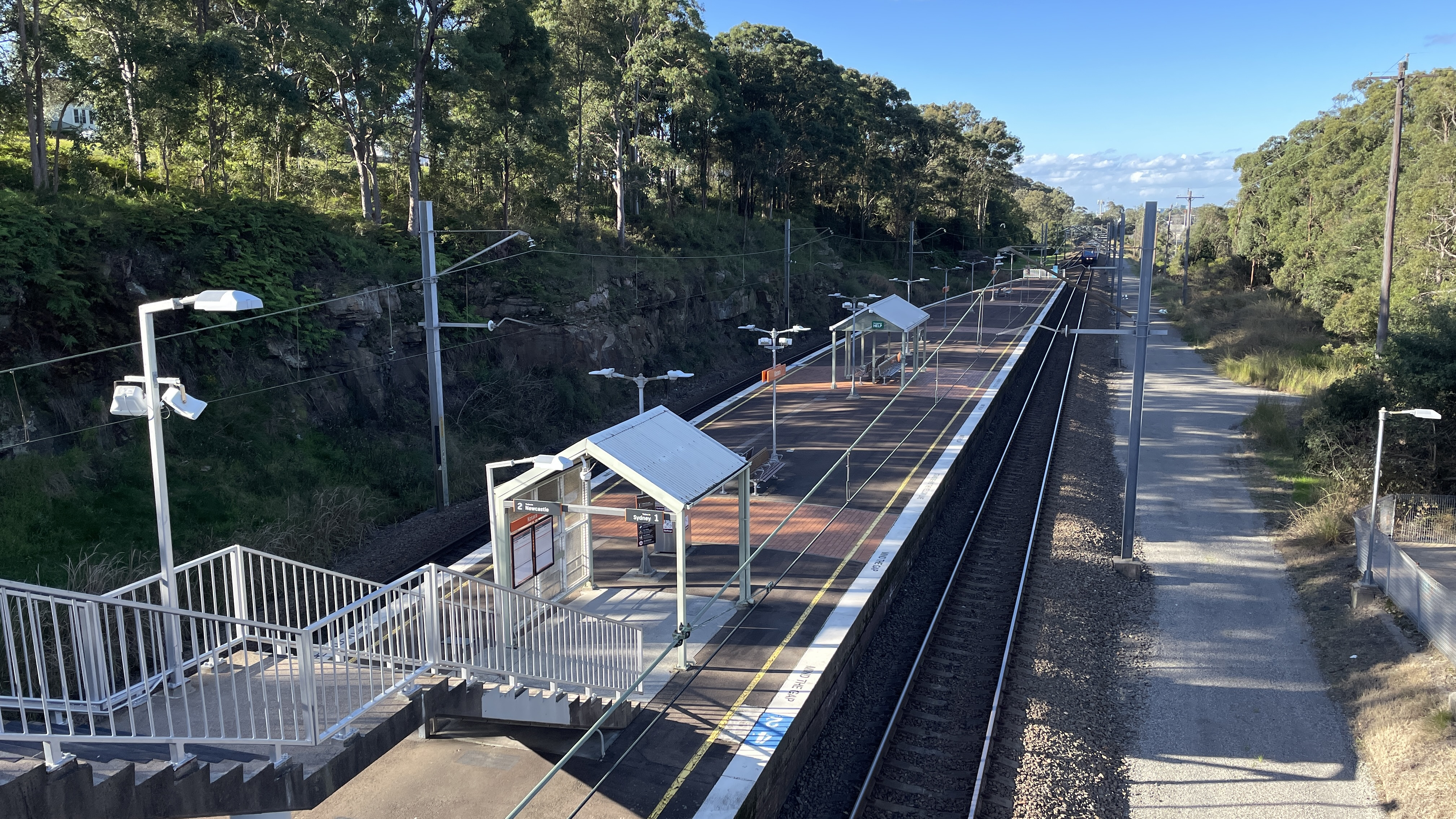
Northbound view from the footbridge

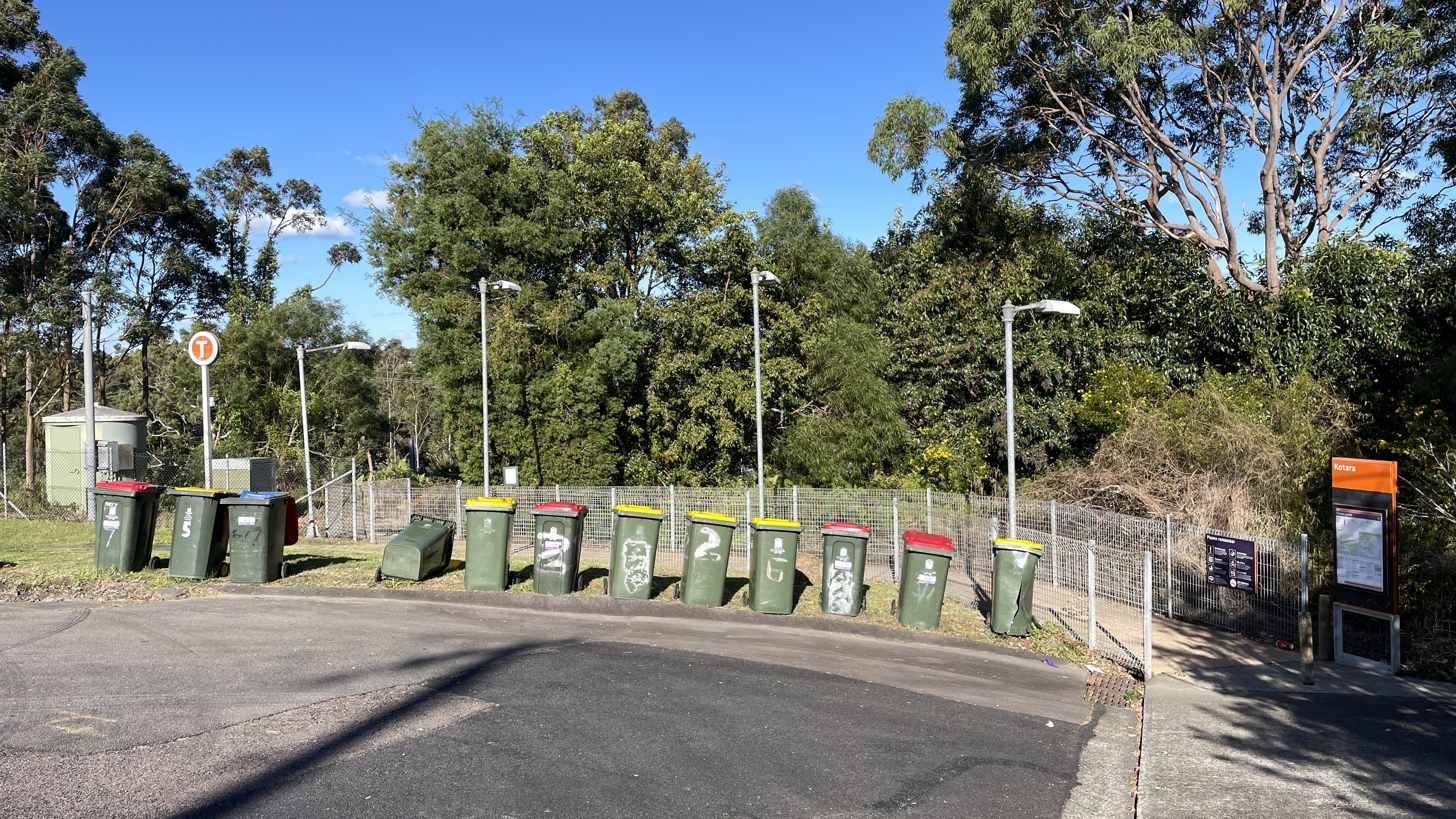
Entrance from Kotara Place

== See also ==
- Tickhole Tunnel
