= Kouat Noi =

Australian basketball player

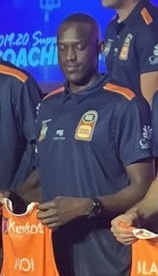
- Noi with the Cairns Taipans in 2019

No. 12 – New Zealand Breakers
- Position: Forward
- League: NBL

Personal information
- Born: 29 October 1997 (age 29) Khartoum, Sudan
- Listed height: 2.01 m (6 ft 7 in)
- Listed weight: 103 kg (227 lb)

Career information
- High school: San Clemente (Newcastle, New South Wales); St Francis Xavier's College (Newcastle, New South Wales); Montverde Academy (Montverde, Florida)
- College: TCU (2017–2019)
- NBA draft: 2020: undrafted
- Playing career: 2019–present

Career history
- 2019–2022: Cairns Taipans
- 2022–2023: USC Rip City
- 2022–2026: Sydney Kings
- 2024: Darwin Salties
- 2025: Ningbo Rockets
- 2025: Sutherland Sharks
- 2026: Al Riyadi
- 2026–present: New Zealand Breakers

Career highlights
- LBL champion (2026); 2× NBL champion (2023, 2026); NBL Best Sixth Man (2025); NBL1 North MVP (2022); 3× All-NBL1 North First Team (2022–2024)
Medals
Men's basketball
Representing Australia
FIBA World U17 Championship
Silver medal – second place	2014 Dubai

Kouat Noi (born 29 October 1997) is a South Sudanese-Australian professional basketball player for the New Zealand Breakers of the National Basketball League (NBL). He played college basketball for the TCU Horned Frogs. Noi started his professional career in 2019 with the Cairns Taipans of the NBL. He joined the Sydney Kings in 2022 and won NBL championships in 2023 and 2026.

== Early life ==
Noi was born in Khartoum, Sudan, during the height of the Second Sudanese Civil War. His family fled the country amid escalations of the conflict, first to Egypt and later to Australia in 2002. Growing up in Newcastle, he blossomed into a basketball star, and went on to average 9.1 points and 4.3 rebounds while helping lead Australia to a silver medal at the 2014 FIBA Under-17 World Championship in Dubai.

Noi attended San Clemente High School and St Francis Xavier's College in Newcastle. In 2014, Noi moved to the United States and enrolled at Montverde Academy in Montverde, Florida, where he briefly played alongside Ben Simmons. As a senior in the 2015–16 season, Noi averaged more than 19 points per game for the Eagles.

== College career ==
Noi enrolled at Texas Christian University (TCU) on a basketball scholarship in the summer of 2016, and redshirted in his first season on campus as the Horned Frogs won the 2017 NIT title under first-year head coach Jamie Dixon.

In 2017–18, Noi played in all 33 of TCU's games, starting nine of them. He averaged 10.2 points per game as the Frogs finished the season with a 21-12 record and secured a berth in the 2018 NCAA tournament, the program's first in 20 years.

As a sophomore, Noi registered his first collegiate 20-point game with a 27-point performance against Eastern Michigan on 26 November 2018 and his first career 30-point game against Oklahoma on 12 January 2019. Noi averaged 13.9 points and 4.9 rebounds per game as a sophomore playing in 31 games, including 19 starts. He declared for the 2019 NBA draft, forfeiting his remaining two years of eligibility. He later withdrew from the draft.

== Professional career ==
=== Cairns Taipans (2019–2022) ===
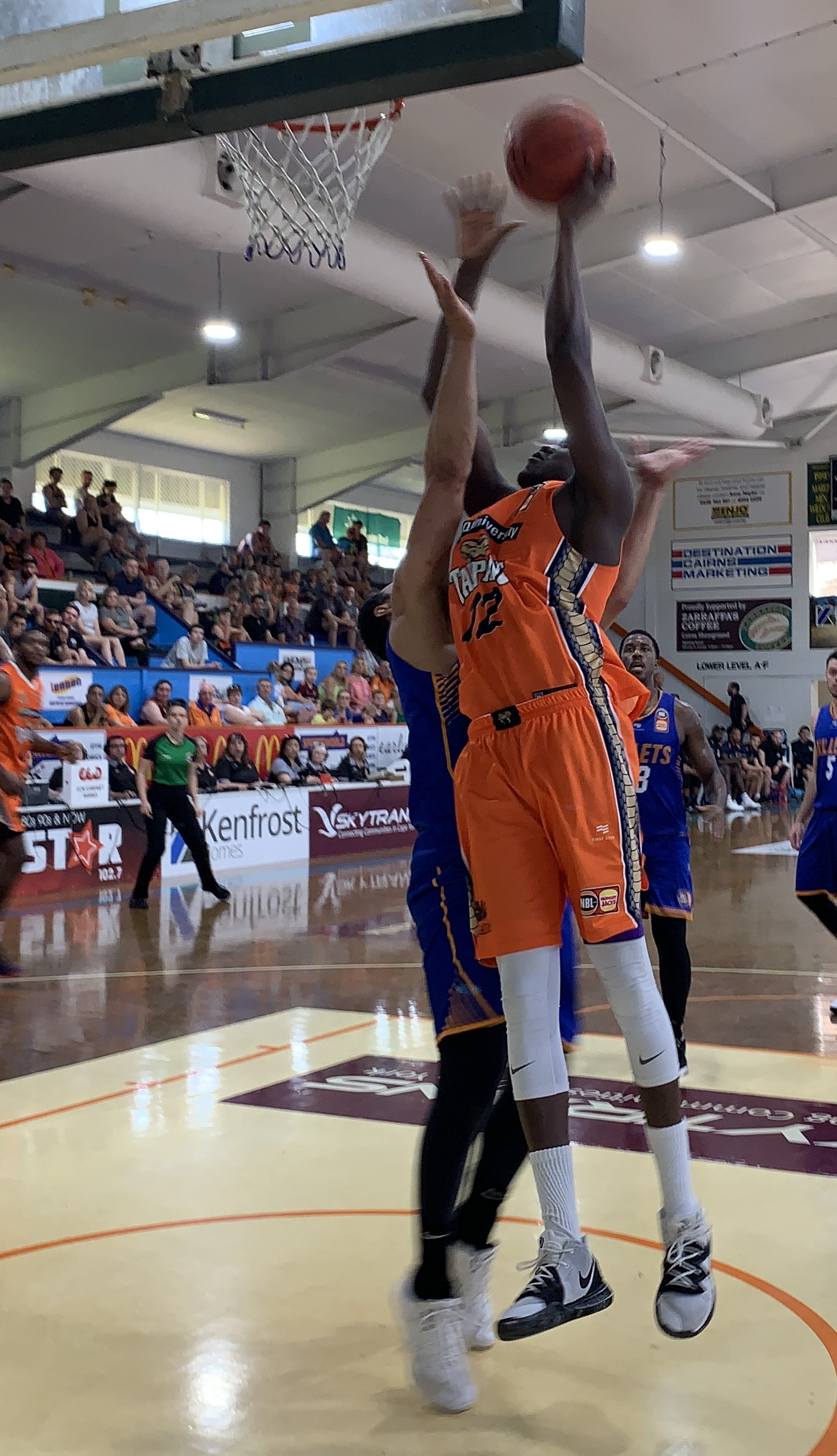
Noi shoots a lay-up against the Brisbane Bullets during a 2019 pre-season game

In July 2019, Noi signed with the Cairns Taipans of the Australian National Basketball League. In March 2021, he suffered a PCL injury that ruled him out for 12 weeks. He re-signed with the Taipans in June 2021.

=== Sydney Kings and off-season stints (2022–2026) ===
Following the 2021–22 NBL season, Noi joined the USC Rip City of the NBL1 North for the 2022 season, where he earned league MVP and All-Star Five honours.

In June 2022, Noi signed a two-year contract with the Sydney Kings. After winning the 2022–23 championship, the club exercised its team option on his contract.

Noi re-joined the USC Rip City for the 2023 NBL1 North season. He was named to the All-NBL1 North First Team for the second straight year.

In the 2023–24 NBL season, Noi averaged 10.0 points and 4.5 rebounds in 25 games for the Kings.

On 18 March 2024, Noi signed with the Darwin Salties for the 2024 NBL1 North season. He was named to the NBL1 North First Team for the third straight year.

On 2 April 2024, Noi re-signed with the Kings on a three-year deal. On 19 January 2025, he scored a career-high 32 points in an 88–77 win over the Tasmania JackJumpers. He was named the NBL Best Sixth Man for the 2024–25 season.

On 27 February 2025, Noi signed with the Ningbo Rockets of the Chinese Basketball Association (CBA) for the rest of the 2024–25 season. Following the CBA season, he joined the Sutherland Sharks of the NBL1 East for the 2025 season.

In the 2025–26 NBL season, Noi won his second NBL championship with the Kings. He parted ways with the Kings following the season after 127 games across four seasons.

In May 2026, Noi joined Al Riyadi for the end of the 2025–26 Lebanese Basketball League season. He helped the team win the championship, averaging 13.6 points per game across the seven-game Finals series.

=== New Zealand Breakers (2026–present) ===
On 22 May 2026, Noi signed a two-year deal with the New Zealand Breakers. On 15 November 2026, he scored 19 of his 32 points in the fourth quarter of a 111–102 double-overtime loss to the Sydney Kings.

== National team career ==
Noi was named to the training camp squad of the South Sudan basketball team for the 2024 Summer Olympics.

== Personal life ==
Noi was born in Sudan but considers himself as South Sudanese. His father, Ater Dhiu, played basketball for the Sudan men's national basketball team. Noi is a cousin of fellow basketball players, Yuat Alok and Lat Mayen.

Noi has two children with his partner who is an Indigenous Australian.
