= Belmont railway line =

Belmont railway line may refer to:

- Belmont railway line, New South Wales
- Belmont railway line, Western Australia
