= Fernleigh Track =

Trail in New South Wales, Australia

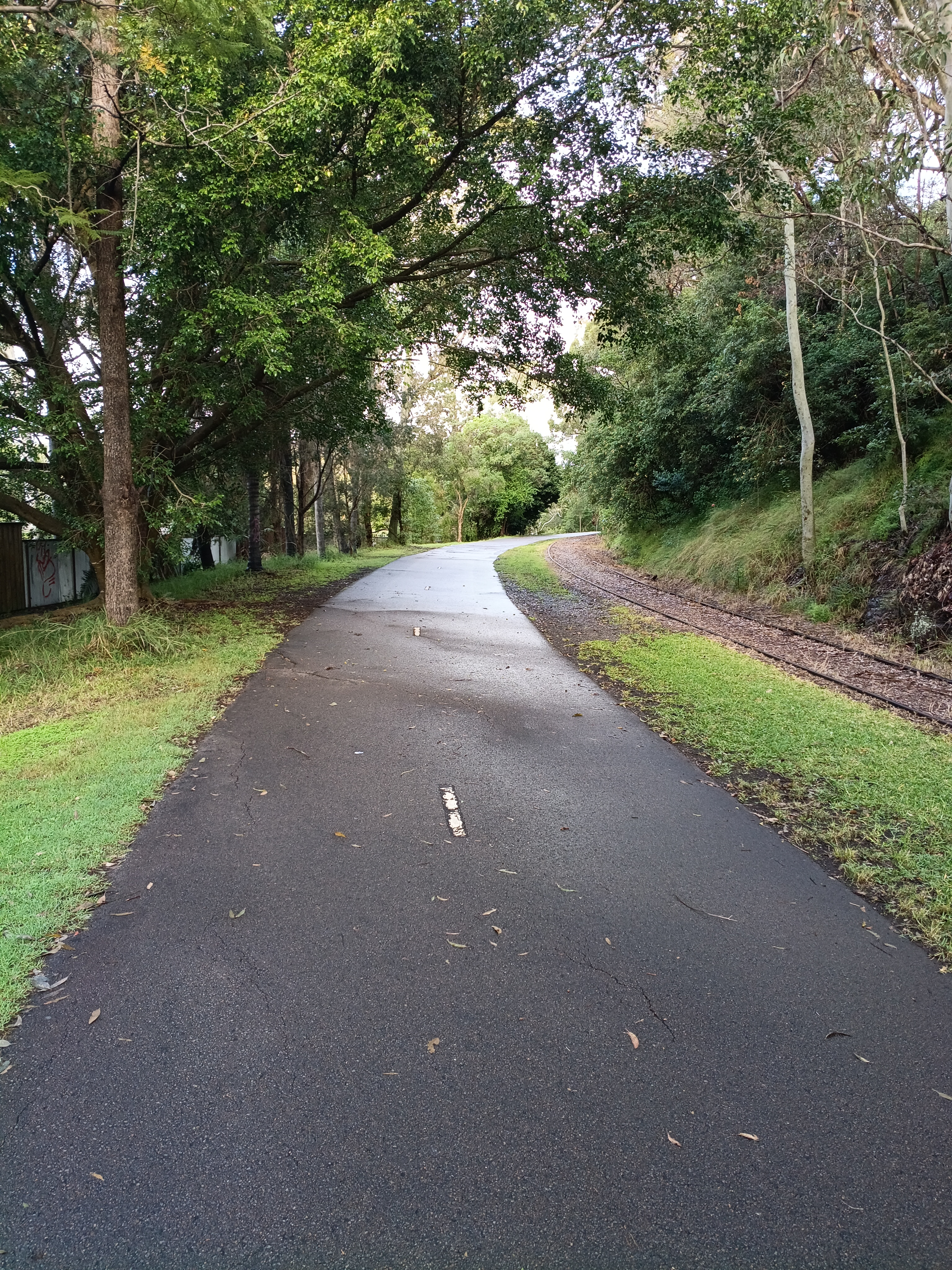
Fernleigh Track pathway with surrounding vegetation along the former railway line.

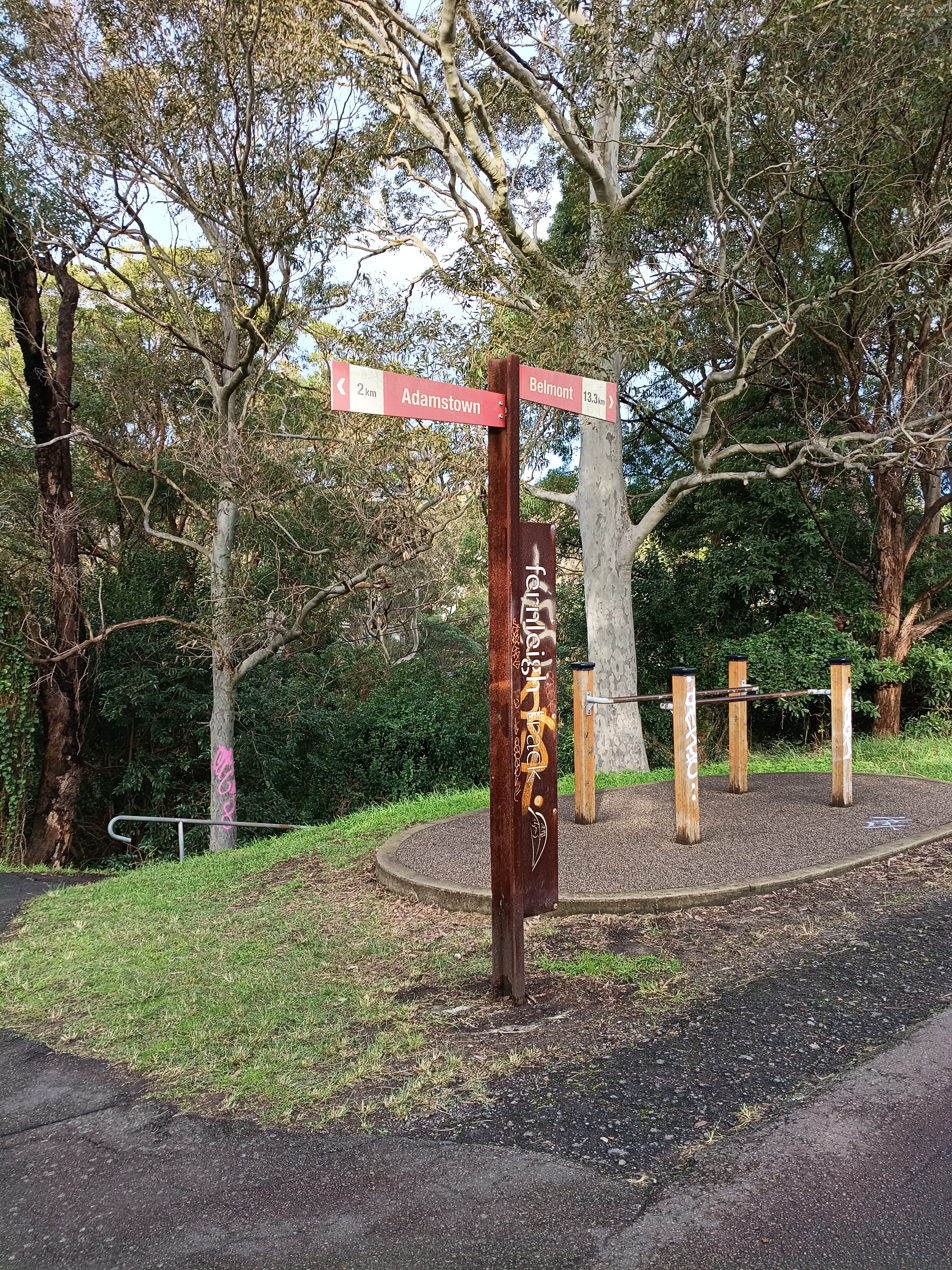
Outdoor exercise equipment (dip bar station) along the shared path.

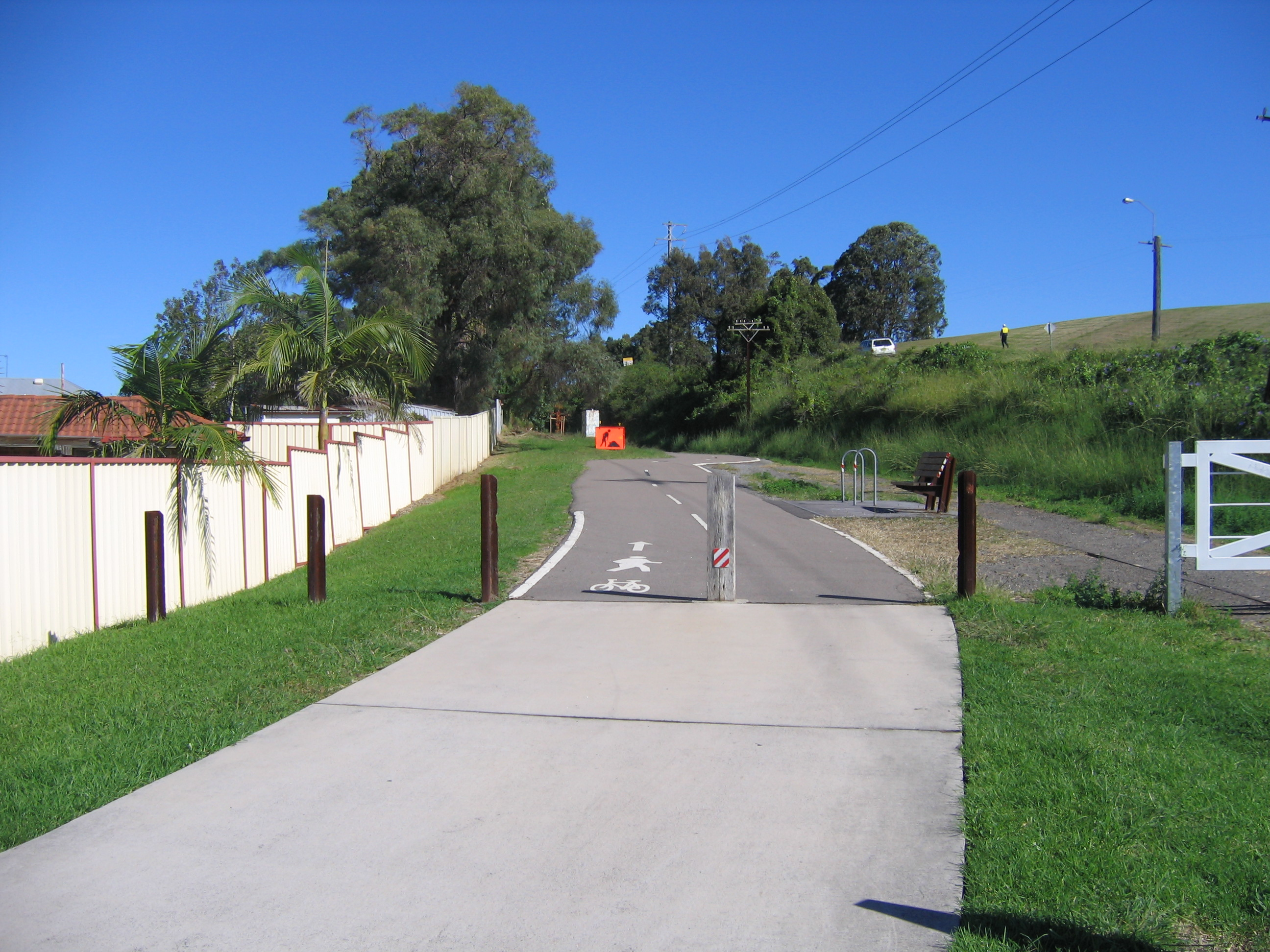
Looking south along The Fernleigh Track from near Adamstown railway station

The Fernleigh Track is a multi-use rail trail near Belmont, New South Wales. The track was constructed in the way of the former Belmont railway line. The project is a joint venture between Newcastle City Council and City of Lake Macquarie. The track extends from Adamstown to Belmont over a distance of 15.5 km (10 mi). The railway closed in December 1991. The first section between Adamstown and Burwood Road opened in 2003. Construction continued in stages with the final section between Jewells and Belmont completed in March 2011.

The first section of the Belmont railway line opened in 1892 to Dudley Junction, with the line being extended to Belmont in 1917. At one stage, there was talk of extending the line to Swansea.

A feature of the conversion of the former railway to a multi-use trail is the retention of many industrial heritage features. The trail passes through the brick-lined Fernleigh Tunnel under the Pacific Highway.

At the site of the former Kahibah station, the cycleway is crossed by the Great North Walk, a 250 km (155 mi) walking trail connecting Newcastle and Sydney. The track also passes through the centre of the Glenrock Lagoon catchment.

The track is used by cyclists, wheelchair users, walkers, runners, and dog walkers. Motorized vehicles, including motorcycles, are prohibited on the track. It also hosts community events such as the annual Fernleigh 15 running race, which is held along its full length.

== Track details ==
=== Station/platform (distance) ===
- Adamstown
- Fernleigh: (2.82 km (1.75 mi))
- Kahibah: (3.78 km (2.35 mi))
- Dudley Junction: (4.59 km (2.85 mi))
- Burwood Platform: (5.09 km (3.16 mi))
- Whitebridge: (5.77 km (3.59 mi))
- Redhead: (9.27 km (5.76 mi))
- Redhead South: (10.56 km (6.56 mi))
- Jewells: (12.13 km (7.54 mi))
- John Darling Platform: (12.39 km (7.70 mi))
- Belmont: (15.51 km (9.64 mi))

== History of the line ==
- 1 September 1892: Railway line opened to Dudley Junction
- 2 January 1917: Railway line extended to Belmont
- January 1925: Redhead Loop name changed to Fernleigh Loop
- 8 April 1971: Last passenger train to Belmont
- 19 December 1991: Railway line closed
- 2 February 2003: Adamstown to Kahibah station stage opened
- August 2004: Dudley Junction to Whitebridge station section completed
- 7 May 2005: Kahibah Station to Whitebridge station section opened
- November 2009: Whitebridge Station to Redhead station section completed
- November 2010: Redhead Station to Jewels section completed
- 12 March 2011: Fernleigh Track opened to Belmont
- 14 July 2024: extended to Murrays Beach

== Fernleigh Tunnel ==
The Fernleigh Tunnel is one of the most significant historic features of the track. It is located between Adamstown and Belmont and passes beneath the Pacific Highway, serving as a connection point between Newcastle and Lake Macquarie region.

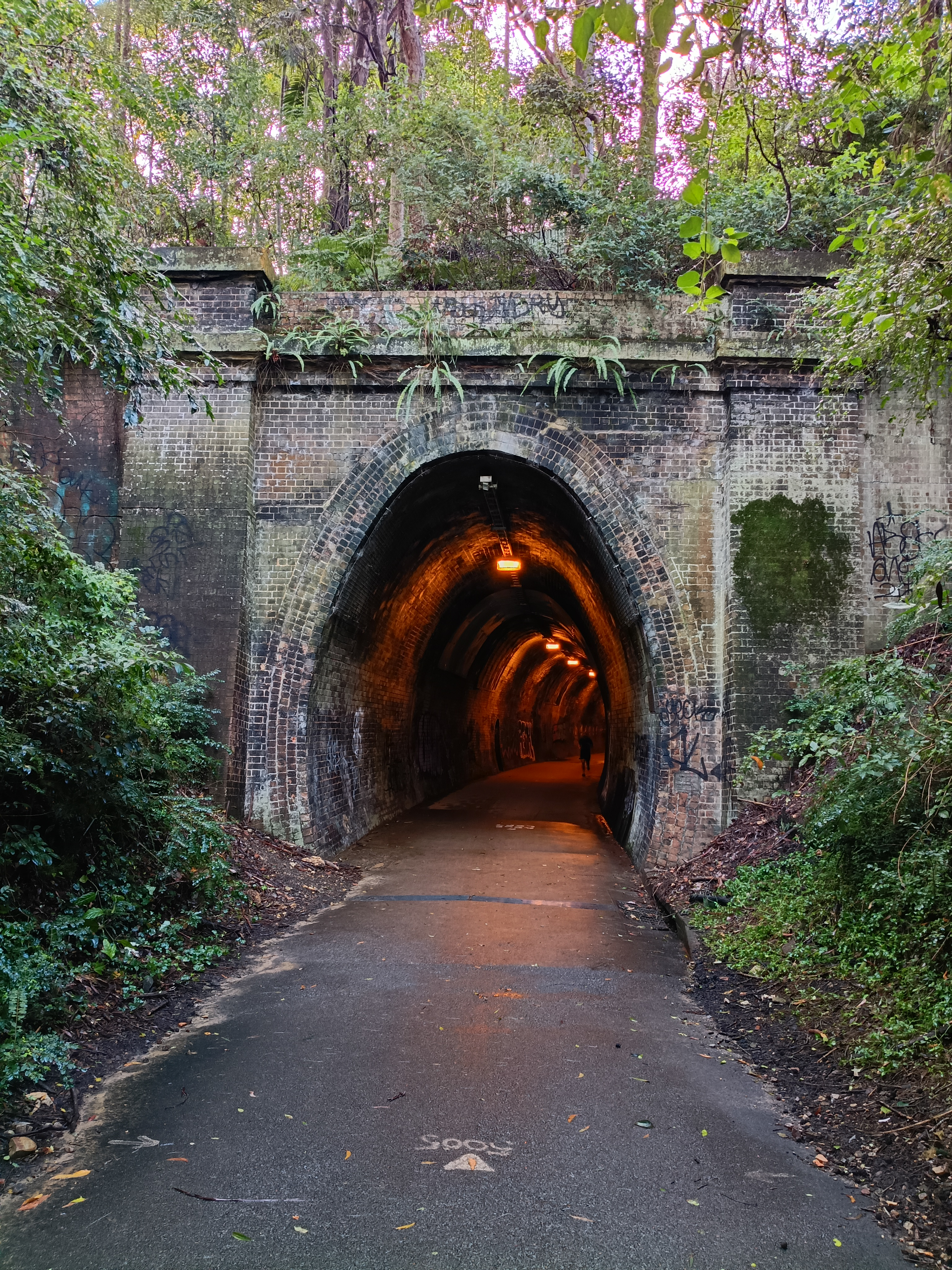
South portal of the Fernleigh Track Tunnel

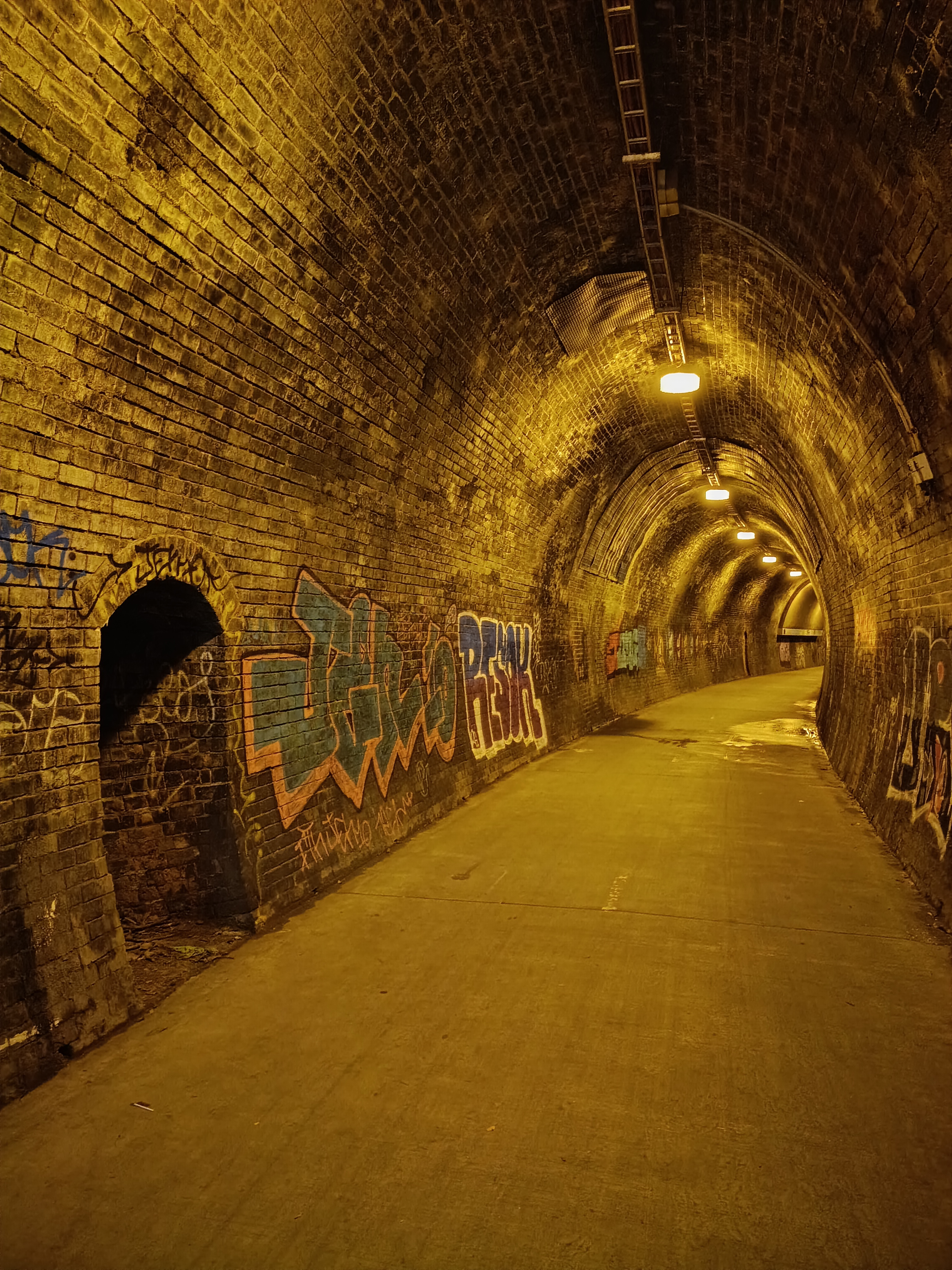
Brick-lined interior of the former railway corridor.

Constructed in the early 1890s and opened in November 1892 as part of the Belmont railway line, the 180 metres brick-lined tunnel has a curved alignment to maintain acceptable railway gradients while passing beneath the Pacific highway. By 1992, the tunnel ceased to be a railway tunnel and was reopened as part of the Fernleigh track by 2003 for cyclists and pedestrians. Lighting has been installed inside the tunnel to improve visibility and safety. The Fernleigh Tunnel has been featured in several Australian television commercials.
