= Adamstown, New South Wales =

Adamstown
- Suburb
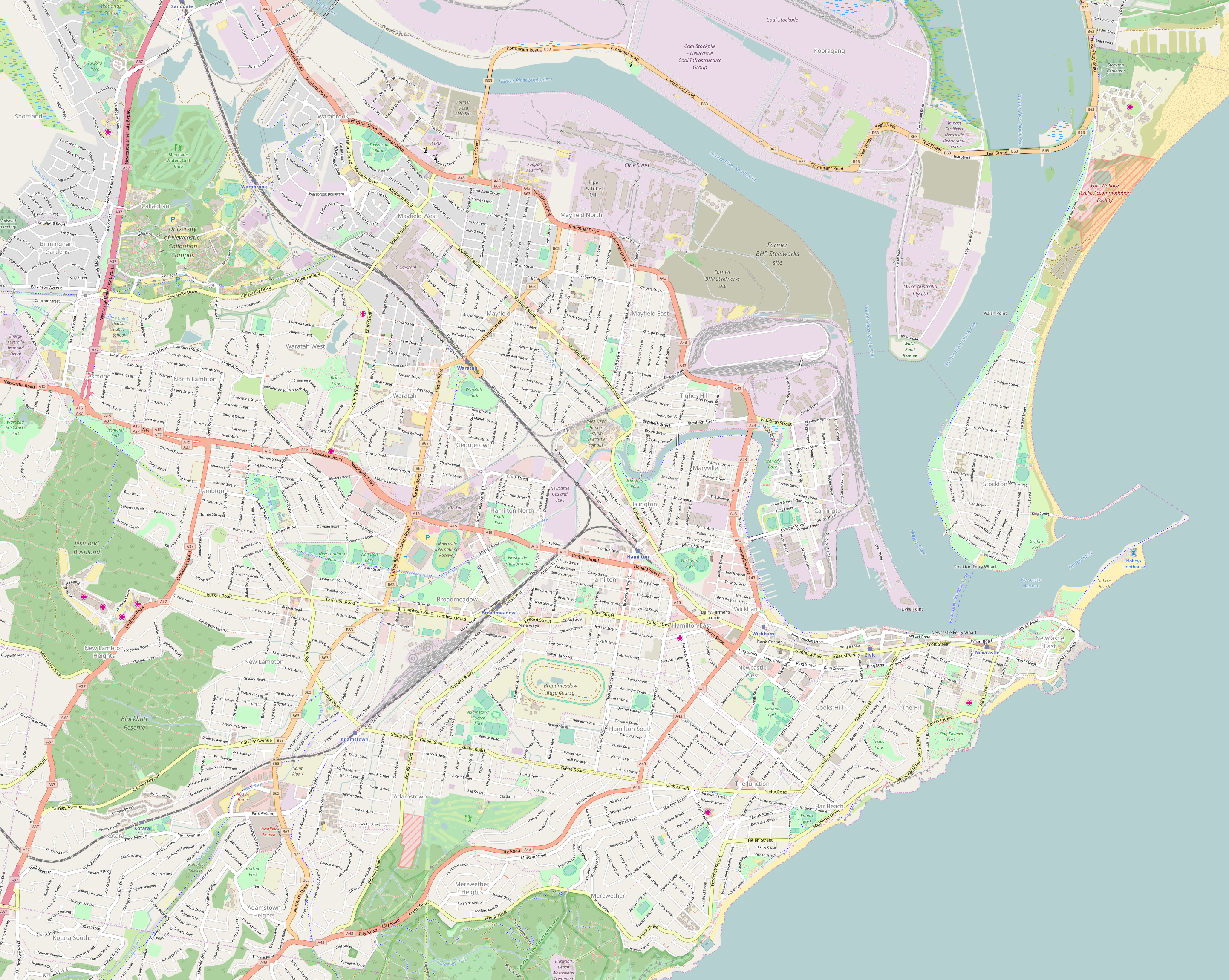
- Interactive map of Adamstown
- Coordinates: 32°56′04″S 151°43′33″E
- Country: Australia
- State: New South Wales
- City: Newcastle
- LGAs: City of Newcastle; City of Lake Macquarie
- Location: 6 km (3.7 mi) WSW of Newcastle; 5 km (3.1 mi) NE of Charlestown; 34 km (21 mi) SE of Maitland; 61 km (38 mi) N of The Entrance; 154 km (96 mi) NNE of Sydney

Government
  - State electorates: Charlestown; Newcastle
  - Federal division: Newcastle

Area
  - Total: 3 km^{2} (1.2 sq mi)
- Elevation: 22 m (72 ft)

Population
  - Total: 6,335 (SAL 2021)
- Postcode: 2289
- Parish: Newcastle
Suburbs around Adamstown
New Lambton	Broadmeadow	Broadmeadow
New Lambton	Adamstown	Hamilton South
Kotara	Adamstown Heights	Merewether

Adamstown is a suburb of Newcastle, New South Wales, Australia, located 6 kilometres (4 mi) from Newcastle's central business district. It is split between the City of Newcastle and City of Lake Macquarie local government areas.

== History ==
The suburb takes its name from Thomas Adam, who purchased a land grant of 54 acres of Crown land.

Adamstown (Adam’s Town) officially became a suburb in 1885 and the first council was elected in 1886 with the council chambers being completed in 1892. In 1938 Adamstown merged into other local council areas to become the areas of Greater Newcastle.

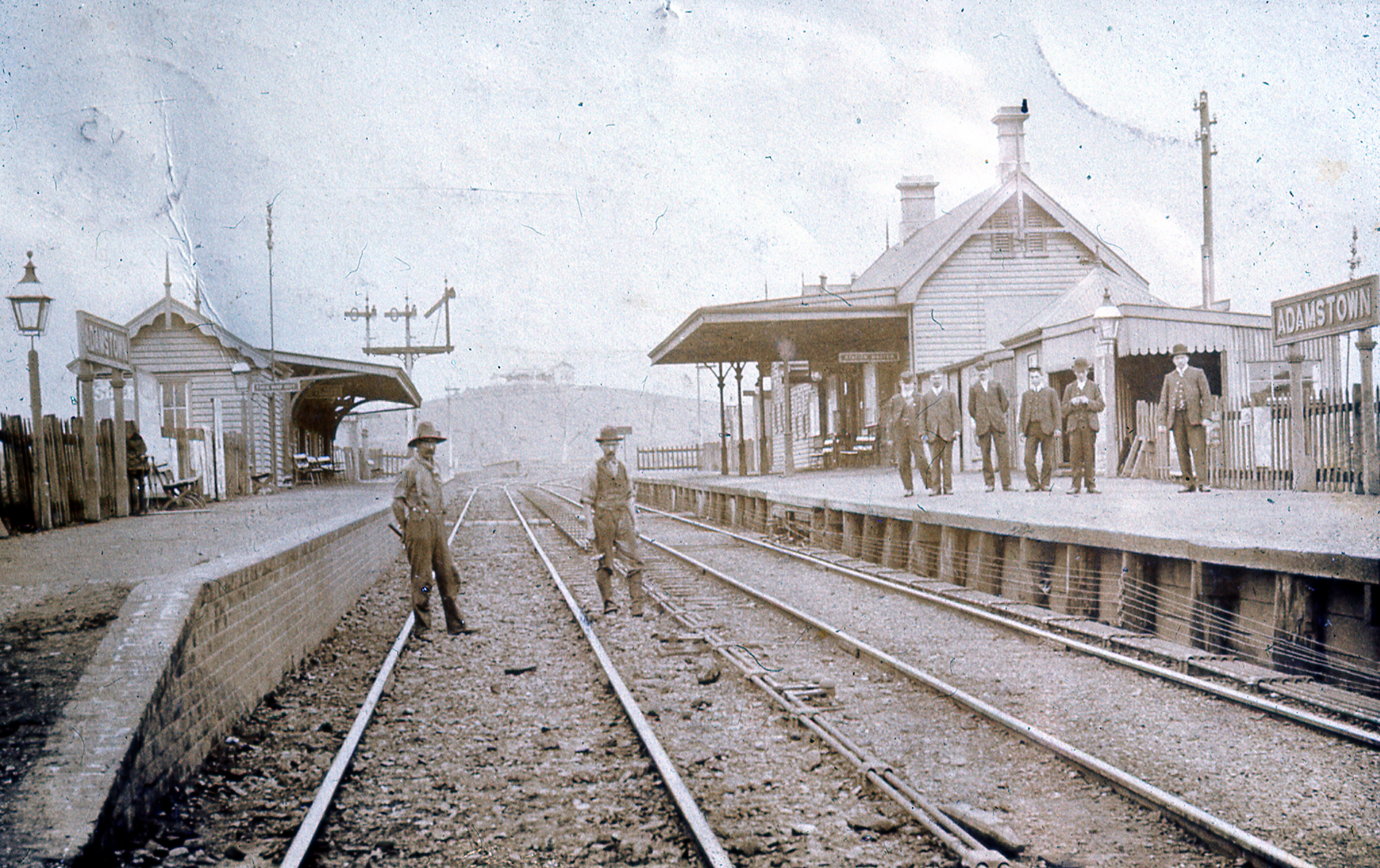
Adamstown railway station, NSW, 1908

The Adamstown railway station opened in 1887 with the Newcastle–Gosford section of the Main North line. The now closed branch line to Belmont formerly left the main line just south of Adamstown Station. The town also includes the beginning of the Fernleigh Track, a multi-use rail trail near Belmont. The project is a joint venture between Newcastle City Council and Lake Macquarie City Council and extends from Adamstown to Belmont over an approximate distance of 15.5 km (9.6 mi).

A military rifle range was established in the suburb in 1901, which was later redeveloped as Bullecourt Barracks and remains a depot for Australian Army Reserve units in the Newcastle area.

== Demographics ==
According to the 2021 census of Population, there were 6,335 people in Adamstown.

- Aboriginal and Torres Strait Islander people made up 3.0% of the population.
- 84.6% of people were born in Australia. The next most common country of birth was England at 2.0%.
- 88.1% of people only spoke English at home.
- The most common responses for religion were No Religion 47.1%, Catholic 21.1% and Anglican 11.0%.

== Education ==
A number of schools are located in the suburb:

- St Pius X High School (Years 7–10), first established in 1957 and became co-educational in 1983, absorbing the campus of St Anne's College, a girls' school established in 1966. Students transfer in year 11 to St Francis Xavier's College, Hamilton. In 2007, the school had an enrolment of 1,010 and a staff of 97.
- Adamstown Public School and St Columba's Primary School are also located within the suburb's boundaries.

== Community support ==
Adamstown has a range of community support organisations. These include St Columbas Catholic Church and the Returned Serviceman's League sub-branch that is part of the Adamstown Community Club.

The Adamstown Rosebud Football club has produced 16 Socceroos including Ray Baartz and Col Curran among others.

The club is also one of the oldest football clubs in Australia, having formed in 1889.

The club still plays out of Adamstown Oval, the original home ground from the club's inaugural season.
