= Willie Tupou =

Tonga international rugby league footballer

Personal information
- Born: 26 October 1985 (age 39); Newcastle, NSW

Playing information
- Position: Second-row
Club
Years	Team	Pld	T	G	FG	P
	Newcastle Knights
Representative
Years	Team	Pld	T	G	FG	P
2006	Tonga	6	2	0	0	8
- Relatives: Anthony Tupou (brother)

Willie Tupou (born 26 October 1985) is a former Tonga international rugby league footballer who played as a second-row forward. He previously played for the Newcastle Knights in the NRL.

== Background ==
Tupou was born in Newcastle, New South Wales, Australia.

He is also the younger brother of NRL star Anthony Tupou.

== Career ==
Tupou has also appeared on several occasions for the Tonga national rugby league team with his most recent international games coming during the 2006 Federation Shield competition.
