= Anthony Tupou =

Australia & Tonga international rugby league footballer

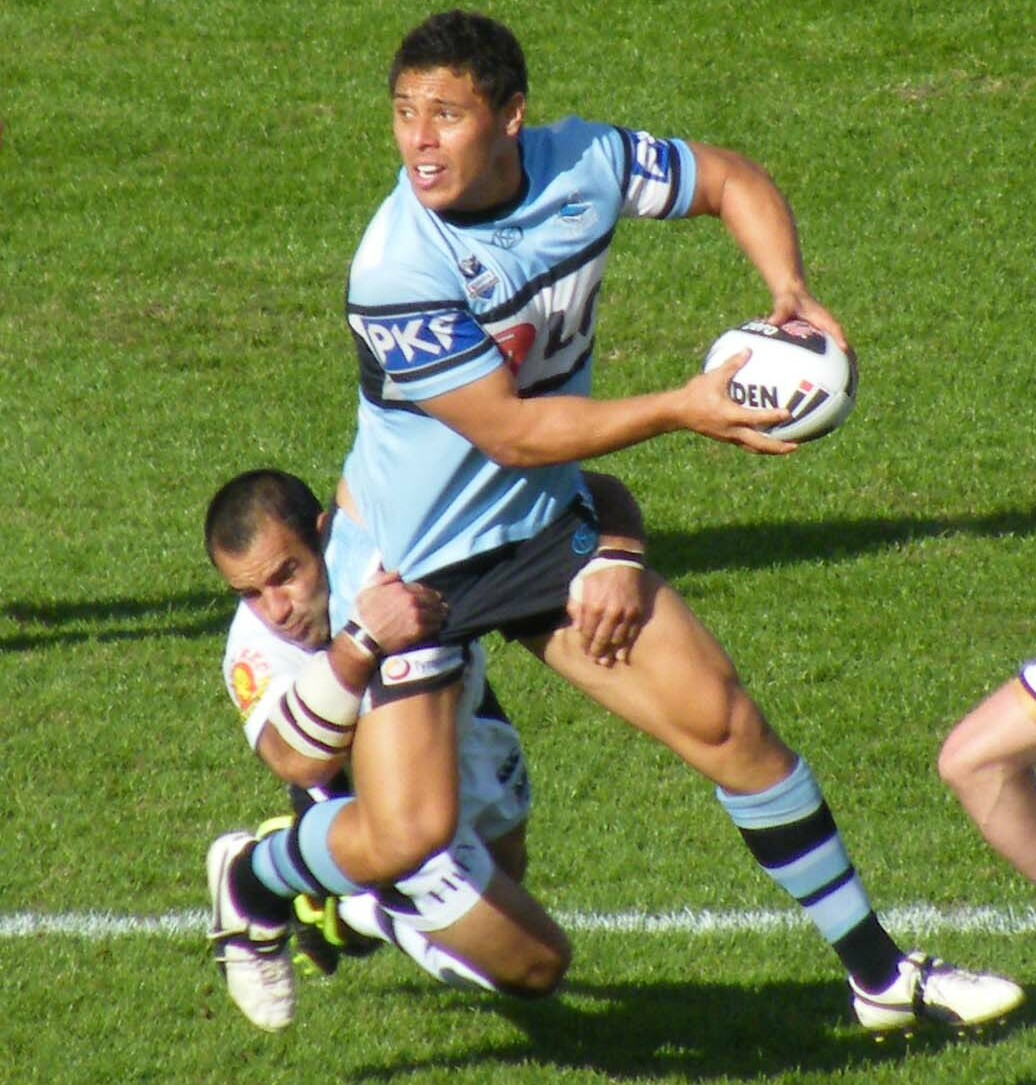

Personal information
- Born: 1 March 1983 (age 43) Newcastle, New South Wales, Australia

Playing information
- Height: 183 cm (6 ft 0 in)
- Weight: 102 kg (16 st 1 lb)
- Position: Second-row, Lock
Club
Years	Team	Pld	T	G	FG	P
2004–08	Sydney Roosters	111	19	0	0	76
2009–15	Cronulla Sharks	125	10	0	0	40
2016	Wakefield Trinity Wildcats	25	5	0	0	20
2017	Newcastle Knights	4	0	0	0	0
	Total	265	34	0	0	136
Representative
Years	Team	Pld	T	G	FG	P
2005–09	NSW Country	2	0	0	0	0
2005–07	Prime Minister's XIII	3	0	0	0	0
2006–08	Australia	11	2	0	0	8
2007–08	New South Wales	4	0	0	0	0
2010	NRL All Stars	1	0	0	0	0
2013	Tonga	1	0	0	0	0
- Education: St Francis Xavier's College, Hamilton
- Relatives: Willie Tupou (brother)

Anthony Tupou (born 1 March 1983) is a former professional rugby league footballer who played as a second-row and lock in the 2000s and 2010s. An Australian international and New South Wales State of Origin representative, he played for the Sydney Roosters, Cronulla-Sutherland Sharks and Newcastle Knights in the National Rugby League, while also having a stint in the Super League with the Wakefield Trinity Wildcats.

== Background ==
Tupou was born in Newcastle, New South Wales, Australia. He attended school at St Francis Xavier's College, Hamilton.

== Professional career ==
=== Sydney Roosters ===
Tupou made his first-grade début in 2004 against the South Sydney Rabbitohs. In the September 2004 issue of Big League magazine, after making his début with the Roosters, Tupou claimed that growing up his favourite player to watch was Queensland legend Mal Meninga. He also claimed that the biggest influence on his football was his father and his club coach Ricky Stuart. At the end of that season he played for the Roosters from the interchange bench in their 2004 NRL grand final loss to cross-Sydney rivals, the Bulldogs.

In 2005, Tupou made his representative début in the City vs Country Origin for the Country NSW team.

At the end of the 2006 season, Tupou was selected for the Australian team, as a replacement for Reni Maitua. He played four matches, scoring one try.

Tupou retained his Test spot in 2007 for the Anzac Test against New Zealand. Tupou made his début for New South Wales in Game 1 of the 2007 State of Origin series. His Test début came before his Origin debut. However, he was dropped for Game 2.

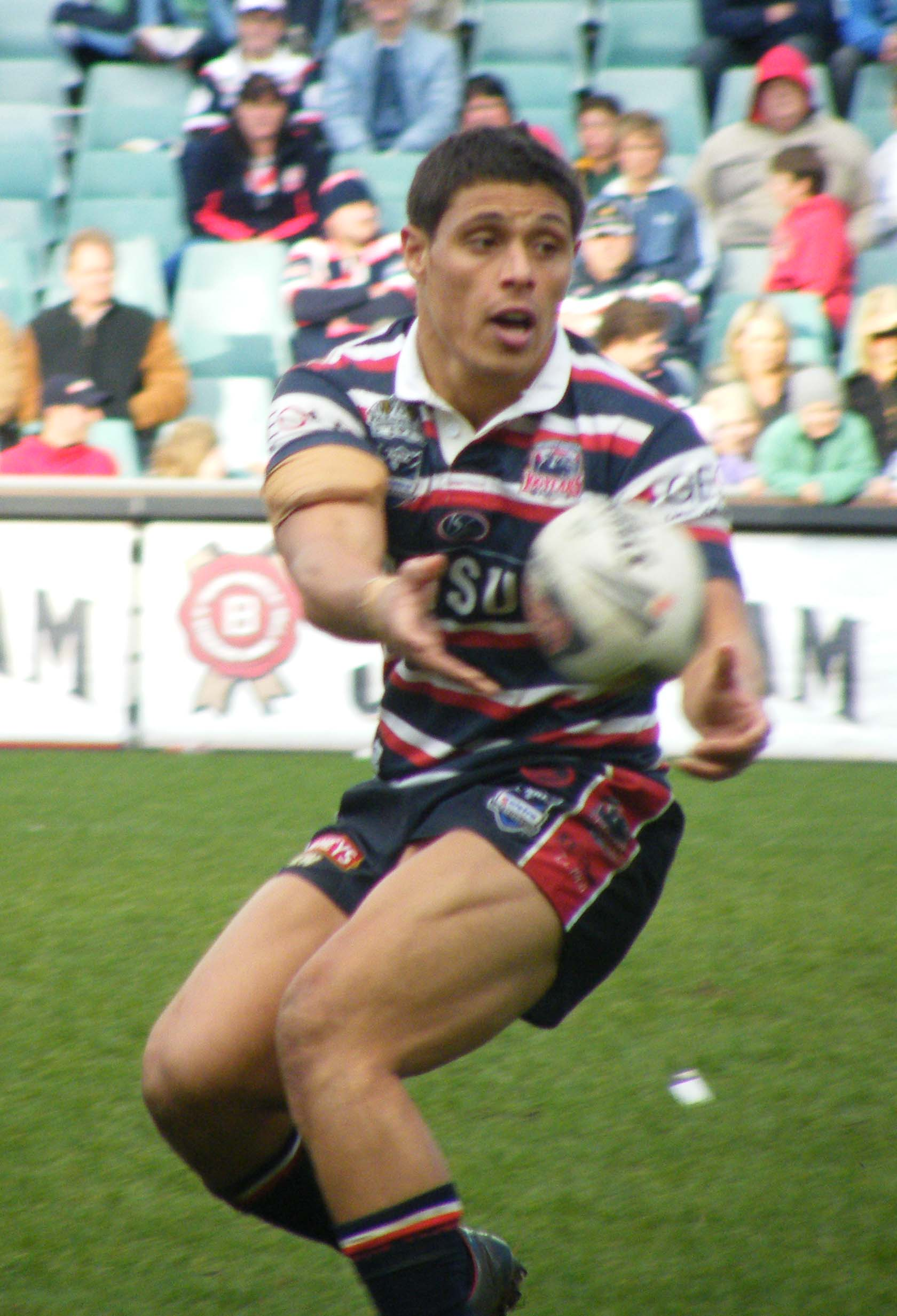
Tupou playing for the Roosters in 2008

On 22 April 2008, Tupou announced that he had accepted a 4-year deal with the Cronulla Sharks worth 1.5 million dollars.

In August 2008, Tupou was named in the Australia training squad for the 2008 Rugby League World Cup. He was named in the Australia squad for the 2008 Rugby League World Cup, replacing Michael Crocker who withdrew through injury. Although also named in the Tonga training squad for the 2008 Rugby League World Cup, Tupou played for Australia.

=== Cronulla-Sutherland Sharks ===
Tupou played for the Sharks mainly at second-row forward. Tupou was named in NSW's preliminary 40-man squad for the 2009 State of Origin series. He was selected for Country in the City vs Country match on 8 May 2009.

In 2013, Tupou played for the Tonga national rugby league team in their 2013 Polynesian Cup clash with fierce rivals Samoa.

On 22 August 2014, Tupou became one of the current Sharks players to accept reduced bans from the Australian Sports Anti-Doping Authority for his role in the club's 2011 supplements scandal.

=== Wakefield Trinity Wildcats ===
On 2 November 2015, Tupou signed a 2-year contract with Super League side Wakefield Trinity Wildcats starting in 2016.

=== Newcastle Knights ===
In 2017, Tupou returned to his hometown to play for the Newcastle Knights on a 1-year contract. He made his Knights début in round 5 of the 2017 season against his former club Cronulla. With a hip injury limiting his time at the Knights to only four games, he announced his retirement in September 2017.
