= Belmont railway station, New South Wales =

Former railway station in New South Wales, Australia

Belmont
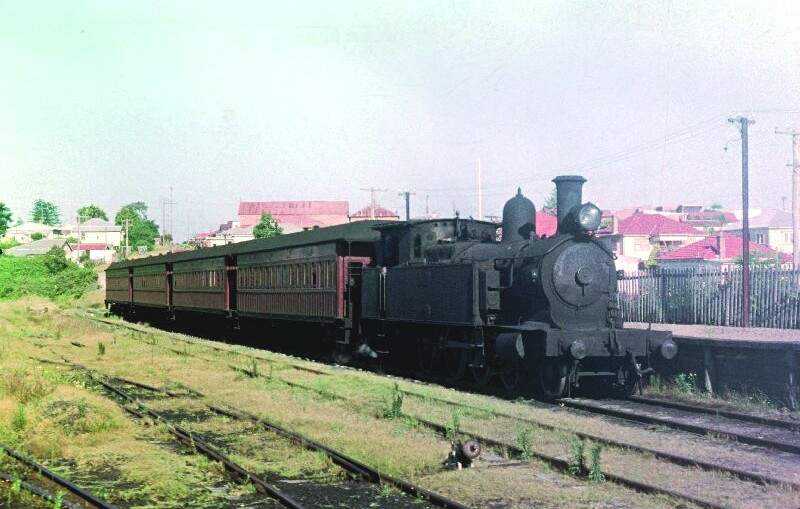

General information
- Location: New South Wales, Australia
- Coordinates: 33°02′21″S 151°39′42″E
- Line: Belmont

History
- Opened: 2 January 1917
- Closed: 9 April 1971
Location

Belmont is a closed railway station on the Belmont railway line in New South Wales, Australia. The station opened in 1917 and closed on 2 January 1971.

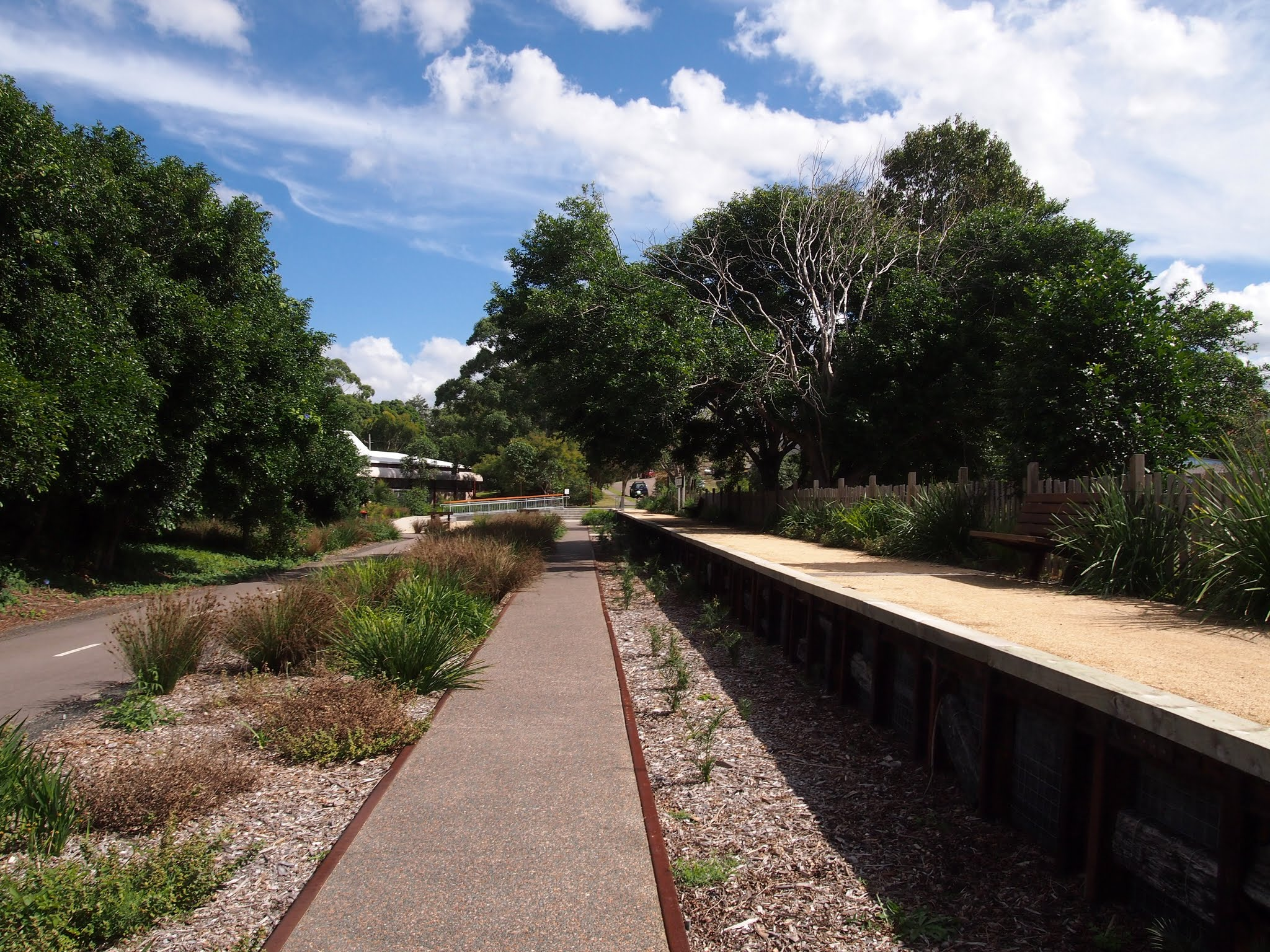
The station now forms part of the Fernleigh Track.
