= Jewells railway station =

Former railway station in New South Wales, Australia

Jewells

General information
- Location: New South Wales, Australia
- Coordinates: 33.0209°S 151.6860°E
- Line: Belmont

History
- Opened: 1917
- Closed: 1940
Location

Jewells known from opening until 4 November 1917 as Jewells Swamp is a closed railway platform on the Belmont railway line in New South Wales, Australia. The station opened on 2 January 1917 and closed on 18 April 1940.
