= Belmont railway line, New South Wales =

Closed railway line in New South Wales

Belmont line
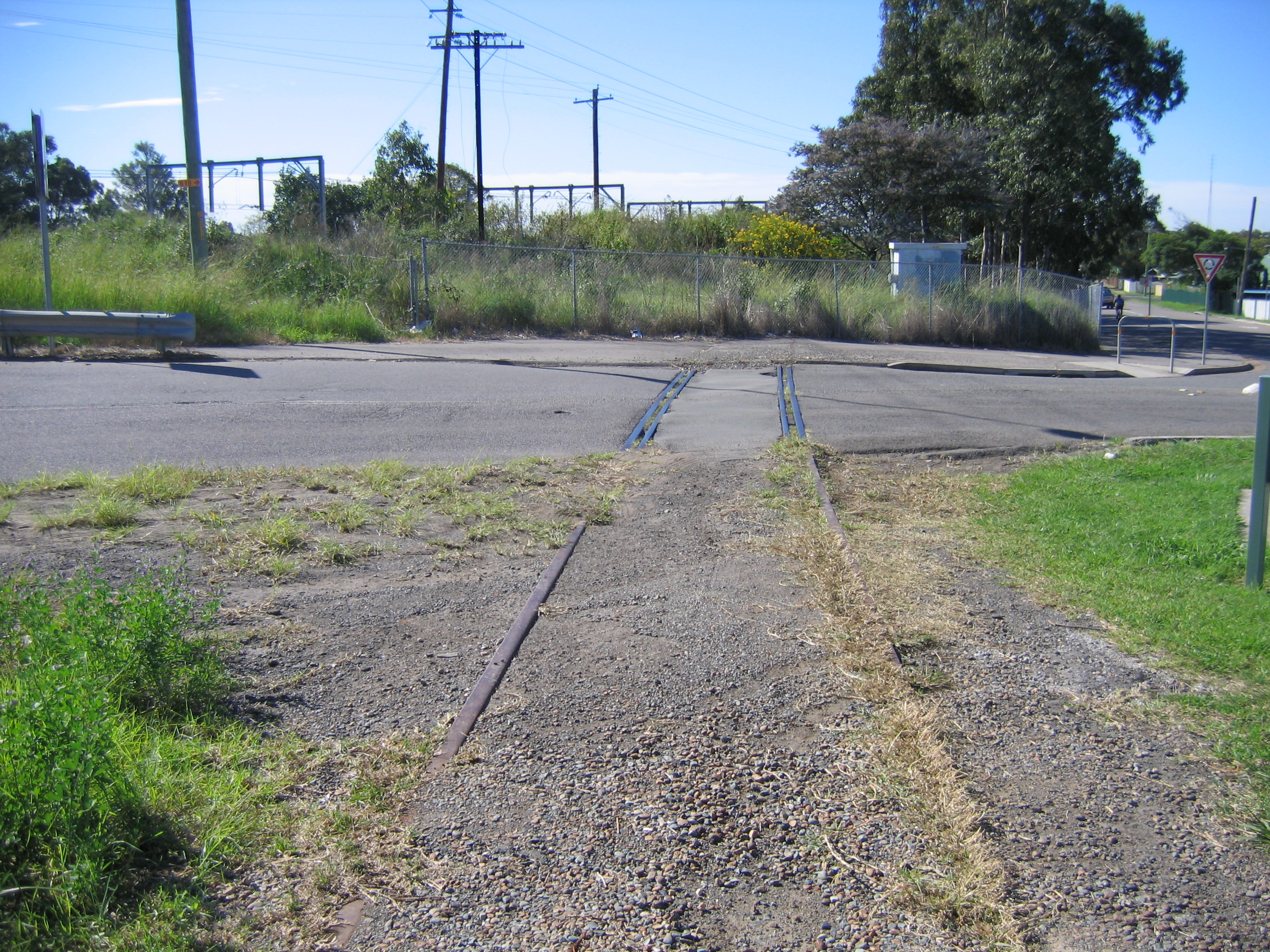
- Looking north across Park Avenue level crossing towards former main line junction

Overview
- Status: Closed
- Owner: New Redhead Estate and Colliery Company
- Locale: Newcastle, New South Wales
- Termini: Adamstown; Belmont
- Stations: 8

Service
- Type: Heavy rail

History
- Opened: 1 December 1892
- Extended to Belmont: 1916
- Closed: 19 December 1991

Technical
- Line length: 15.51 km (9.64 mi)
- Character: Single track
- Track gauge: 1,435 mm (4 ft 8 1/2 in) standard gauge
- Highest elevation: 89 m (292 ft)

The Belmont railway line is an abandoned railway line from Adamstown to Belmont in Newcastle, New South Wales. It was a private railway line owned by the New Redhead Estate and Coal Company, and was used for both coal haulage and passenger services. The line closed in December 1991. It has since been converted into the Fernleigh Track, a cycleway rail trail along the route of the former line.

== History ==
=== The Redhead Coal Mining Company ===
In 1881, the Redhead Coal Mining Company Limited obtained rights over 4,123 acres (1,669 ha) of coal bearing lands lying near the headland of that name, and by 1883 had expended some £25,000 in sinking a shaft, installing machinery, and other improvements. In order to transport the coal to Newcastle, the company was desirous of constructing a railway 6 1/4 miles (10.1 km) long, junctioning with the Government line, then under construction, at Adamstown. The necessary act was passed on 14 April 1885, and five years was allowed for the completion of the line. However, trouble developed in that it was found that the population reserve adjoining Newcastle encroached on the company's property, and that several other portions had been taken up by different persons. This led to court proceedings and it was not until 1887 that the position had become sufficiently stabilised to warrant the Company proceeding with the construction of the line. As by this time the company's five-year period prescribed by the act had nearly expired, an amending act was obtained on 5 June 1888, granting a further five-year. On 21 December of that year, another amending act was passed authorising, amongst other things, deviations in the route, a branch to the South Burwood Coal Company's colliery, and an extension of the rights of construction to the northern shores of Lake Macquarie, through or near the village of Belmont.

The railway, as authorised in the amended act, was to leave the Great Northern Railway at Adamstown and continue in a southerly direction, passing under Charlestown by a tunnel, continue through the company's Burwood Estate (where a coal mine was being opened up) and terminate in the company's Redhead Estate, a distance of 6 miles 31 chains (10.3 km), also for a branch line to be constructed leaving the abovementioned railway at a point 2 3/4 miles (4.4 km) from Adamstown, known later as Dudley Junction, and running in a south-east direction to the South Burwood Coal Company's Estate, a distance of 1 mile 58 chains (2.8 km) from the Junction.

=== Coal transport by rail begins ===
Work was commenced early in 1889 and the main line had been completed as far as Burwood (later No.3) Colliery, 3 miles (4.8 km), by the end of 1891. Coal was sent from this mine over the new line early in 1892. Work on the extension to the Redhead Company's Ocean Colliery, and on the branch to the South Burwood Colliery was carried on apace both being open to traffic on 23 November 1892.

An agreement was satisfactorily arranged between the Redhead Company and the Railway Commissioners, whereby the latter were to operate both lines for the company, owing to the Company having neither locomotives nor rolling stock. Both the Burwood and South Burwood Collieries worked successfully, but, after about six months operation the Ocean Colliery at Redhead was closed, the traffic on the line ceasing early in June 1893.

In 1894 the South Burwood Colliery was closed, leaving the Burwood Pit the only one working.

Early in 1896, a new company, the Dudley Coal Mining Company, took over the South Burwood mine and renamed it the Dudley Colliery. This Company re-opened the mine in May 1896, and coal was again transported from the mine from that year. About the same period, the Scottish Australian Mining Company took over the Burwood Colliery, and also opened a new colliery at Redhead, which was named the Durham Colliery.

=== Passenger services begin ===
With the re-opening of the colliery at Dudley in 1896, the Redhead Coal Company approached the Railway Commissioners with a request that a passenger service be operated on the line between Adamstown and Dudley for the convenience of employees at both the Burwood and Dudley Collieries. The Commissioners agreed, and in January 1897 a through twice daily train service was commenced between Newcastle and Dudley, calling at Hamilton, Adamstown, Kahibah, and Burwood Colliery en route.

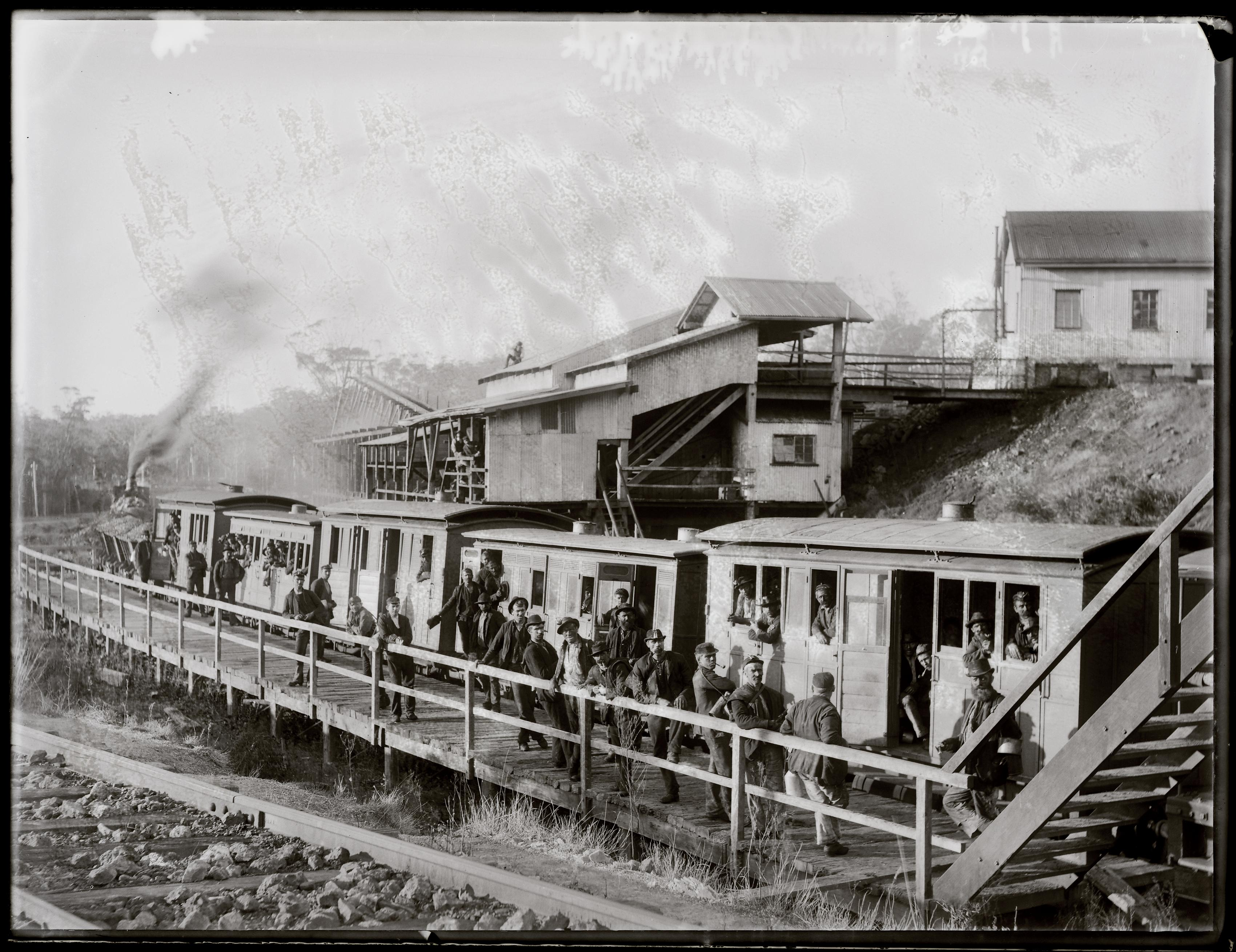
Miners' train at Burwood No.3 (1898)

For the convenience of employees and others who used this train service, small raised platforms were erected at Kahibah, Burwood and Dudley, and all trains stopped regularly at these places to pick up and set down passengers. The Kahibah platform was situated 2 miles 11 chains (3.4 km) from Adamstown, Burwood platform (which served the Burwood Colliery and later as a transfer station to persons travelling to and from the Redhead line) was 5 miles 2 chains (8.1 km) from Adamstown, and Dudley was about 1/4 mile (400 m) short of the colliery. Dudley platform was opened on 14 January 1900, all the other platforms were opened with the commencement of the passenger service. The trains left Newcastle daily (Sundays excepted) at 5.55 a.m., and 1.55 p.m., returning from Dudley on the same days at 3.20, and 11.20 p.m., the time of journey between Newcastle and Dudley being 40 minutes. These trains were worked usually by an E17 class engine hauling either six or eight 4-wheel and 6-wheel old time carriages, and a brake-van.

=== The Redhead Branch ===
During 1898 and 1899, the Scottish Australian Mining Company was opening out its new Durham Mine at Redhead, and among other things a siding was built from this colliery to the abandoned Redhead line, 31 chains (2,000 ft; 620 m) in length. However nothing eventuated until 29 January 1900, when, under the new name of "Lambton B", the Colliery was opened and shortly afterwards coal was transported from the mine over the Redhead line to Dudley Junction. The junction points of the Lambton B siding were situated 2 miles 67 chains (4.6 km) from Dudley Junction.

To handle the coal traffic on the Redhead line, an agreement was made between the Scottish Australian Mining Company and the Redhead Company for the former to work the traffic between Dudley Junction and Lambton B Colliery. This having been ratified by both companies, the Scottish Australian Company transferred an 0-6-0 tank engine "Newcastle" by name, from its colliery near Merewether Beach, to work the traffic late in 1899.

=== Scottish Mining Co. passenger service ===
For the convenience of employees at Lambton B Colliery the Scottish Mining Company decided to operate a passenger service on the line between Lambton B and Dudley Junction connecting at the latter place with Dudley trains to and from Newcastle. This service commenced with the opening of the mine on 29 January 1900, and was worked by the engine "Newcastle" hauling a tram-car, which at first was hired from, and in January 1901 purchased outright from, the Tramways branch of the Railway Commissioners. This car was a 70-passenger steam-trailer, having buffers and drawhooks to replace the usual link and pin couplers, and carried the number 149B. The service between Lambton B and Dudley Junction was worked by the Scottish Australian Mining Company's engine and car.

On account of the passenger accommodation provided on the line being of the tram-car variety arranged for ground loading, no platforms were provided on the Dudley Junction-Lambton B section. A run round loop was provided at Dudley Junction, and persons wishing to travel on the Redhead branch left the Dudley trains at Burwood platform and walked across to the Lambton B engine and car, and vice versa. Further, as the siding arrangements at Lambton B were not suitable for reversing, each trip was extended to the old Ocean Colliery where there was a run round loop, and where the car was stabled when not in use, the locomotive being stabled in the Lambton B yard.

=== Burwood Extended Colliery ===
On 27 August 1903, a Company known as the Ocean Coal Company re-opened the old Ocean Colliery, and on 17 October 1904 renamed it the Burwood Extended Colliery. Coal was raised from this Colliery early in 1904, which increased the traffic on the Redhead line, so that the Redhead Company made a new agreement with the Railway Commissioners and the Scottish Australian Company, wherein the Railway Commissioners were to work all the coal traffic on the line, while the company was to work the passenger traffic between Dudley Junction and Burwood Extended Colliery at Redhead. This new arrangement was brought into force on 28 March 1904, from which date the engine "Newcastle" ceased to haul the coal trains to Dudley Junction, work being done by the Government engines. To meet the increased passenger traffic on the Redhead line, the Scottish Australian Mining Company purchased an additional tram-car from the Government tramways in November 1904. This car was similar in all respects to the original car, but carried the number 107B. When the engine "Newcastle" was not employed hauling the tram-cars, it was used for shunting in the Lambton B yard, shunting at Burwood Extended being done by the Government engines.

=== New Redhead Estate and Coal Mining Company ===
In 1905 the Railway and all property owned by the Redhead Coal Mining Company was sold to a new Company, known as the New Redhead Estate and Coal Mining Company, and during that year an act was passed transferring all the rights of the old to the new Company.

To meet the needs of the local people at Dudley and Redhead slight alterations were made so the train service to Dudley, early in 1906 viz:- The 5.50 p.m. train from Newcastle to Dudley would run every day, the 8.40 a.m. train Dudley to Newcastle would start at 8.10 a.m. and run every day. Connecting with these alterations the Scottish Australian Company ran additional trams leaving Burwood Extended Colliery at 7.55 a.m. and 6.00 p.m. on Mondays to Fridays, and on Saturdays the 8.25 a.m. tram from Burwood Extended was altered to 7.55 a.m. These alterations gave the Dudley residents a three times a day service with connections to Redhead.

In August 1904, a crossing loop was put in at 1 mile 45 chains (2.5 km) from Adamstown and named Redhead loop, it was renamed Fernleigh loop on 12 January 1925, and sidings were put into the Burwood No.3 (late Burwood), Dudley and Burwood Extended Collieries as required. Signal boxes were opened at Dudley Junction, and Lambton 3 Junction on 3 June 1910 and 4 February 1909 respectively.

=== Through passenger trains to Redhead begin ===
At a meeting of the Scottish Australian Company and the New Redhead Company in June 1910, it was decided to ask the Railway Commissioners to work the passenger traffic on the Redhead line. The Commissioners agreed and commencing with the summer timetable of 1910, a through service of passenger trains was introduced between Newcastle and Burwood Extended Colliery at Redhead. The trains, which were run similarly to the Dudley trains, left Newcastle daily (Sundays excepted) at 6.05 a.m., and 2.05 p.m., returning from Burwood Extended at 5.15 and 11.15 p.m. Each train called en route at Hamilton, Adamstown, Kahibah, Lambton B and terminated at Burwood Extended, but instead of the carriages being left at Burwood Extended they were shunted into Lambton B yard ready for the return trip.

With the introduction of through trains on the Redhead line, the two tram-cars belonging to the Scottish Australian Company were sold to the Abermain Coal Company and transferred to Abermain during November 1910, the locomotive "Newcastle" lay derelict until 1914 in the Lambton B yard, when it was sold to Tullochs Phoenix Works at Rhodes near Sydney.

=== Passenger services to Belmont ===
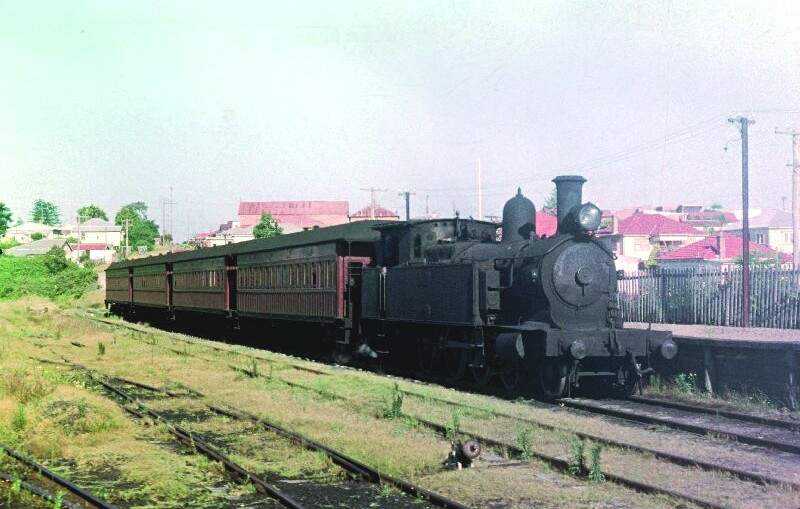
3079 stands at Belmont station with a passenger train on 4 August 1954

As early as 1905, agitation had been started by the local residents to have the Burwood Extended tram service extended to Belmont and Lake Macquarie. The Minister for Works, at the time, had a survey made for a tramline to be built from Burwood Extended Colliery to Belmont.

It was decided by the Government to take over the line from Dudley Junction to Burwood Extended, and run a tram service to Belmont for tourists etc. A deputation from Dudley met the minister, asking that Dudley be not left out of the scheme, and that the tramline should be run through that town. However, on account of difficulties among the local residents themselves, and their not being able to come to some decision, the whole matter was shelved.

In 1914, a fresh agitation was started by the local residents to have a tramway or railway to Belmont, and under the Transfer Act passed in 1905, authority was given to the New Redhead Estate and Coal Company to extend its line from Burwood Extended Colliery to Belmont, a distance of three miles (5 km). Work was carried on during 1915 and 1916 and was completed by October of the latter year. Small platforms were erected at Whitebridge, 5 miles 50 chains (9.1 km) from Adamstown; at Redhead, 6 miles (9.7 km) from Adamstown; at Jewells Swamp, 7 miles 55 chains (12.4 km) from Adamstown and at Belmont, 9 miles 36 chains (15.2 km) from Adamstown. Work on station buildings, etc., having been completed, the railway extension was opened to traffic to Belmont on 23 December 1916.

With the opening of the Belmont extension, a six times daily train service was run on weekdays, with an extra train on Saturdays and four trains on Sundays.

Kahibah had its name changed to Kenibea on 1 June 1915, and back to Kahibah on 6 April 1925. Lambton B Colliery was renamed Lambton Colliery on 1 February 1924. Burwood Extended was renamed Redhead Colliery in 1920. Jewells Swamp was renamed Jewells on 4 November 1925, and transferred to the new site on 5 December 1925. Belmont Colliery siding was opened in 1926 and North Wallarah Colliery siding, also at Belmont, was opened in February 1941. Bramble siding on the Dudley line was opened on 7 July 1909 and closed on 15 March 1929.

During the period 1900–1910, when the Scottish Australian Mining Company was operating a passenger service between Dudley Junction and Burwood Extended Colliery, its engine and cars travelled 102,660 miles (165,220 km) and carried 1,601,650 passengers.

=== Goods trains ===
Public goods traffic was first handled on the Belmont Railway in 1926, sidings being installed at Jewells and Belmont for that purpose, but from 1 September 1939, the Railway Commissioners declined to handle this class of traffic. In February 1941, owing to the difficulty of handling the heavy coal traffic on the line with its handicaps of single line, heavy grades, and non-air braked hoppers, the passenger service was reduced to three trains each way daily.

=== Duplication of the tracks ===
In 1932, Broken Hill Proprietary Company Limited acquired a Colliery Property on the line, which was named John Darling Colliery, and in anticipation of the additional traffic expected, the New Redhead Coal Company shortly afterwards commenced the duplication of the line between Adamstown and Fernleigh tunnel, also between Redhead, and Belmont. This work was stopped during the depression years and was never completed, though the original Redhead platform was replaced by one on a new site at Lambton B Junction in 1925, and a new platform was erected at Redhead South in the same year. A branch line to the John Darling Colliery was opened on 17 March 1925 and a platform, near the junction with the Belmont line, on 15 October 1924.

=== Dudley line closed ===
All traffic on the Dudley Junction-Dudley section ceased on 10 July 1931 and the rails were removed in 1941.

=== Passenger services decline ===
During the 1960s, passenger services were worked by Broadmeadow-based 30-class locomotives, normally hauling up to three end-platform suburban carriages. The locomotives were rostered to work bunker first on the outward journey.

During the final years of passenger services on the line, CPH railmotors were utilised. Passenger services ceased completely on 8 April 1971.

=== The final years ===
Until the early 1960s, coal trains on the Belmont Branch consisted of rakes of non-air-braked, 4-wheel hopper wagons hauled by either a 50 class or a 53 class Standard Goods locomotive on allotment to Port Waratah depot. Locomotives operated tender first towards Belmont and carried respirators for working through Fernleigh Tunnel. From 1963 the BHP Co progressively introduced its own CXD bogie hopper wagons to the Belmont line traffic.

From August 1965, 48-class diesel locomotives took over from the steam engines on the coal trains, however there were brief periods when steam returned because of a shortage of diesel motive power. Later, 44, 45 and 47 class diesels were authorised to work the line, 47 class being particularly prevalent.

A tour of the line as far as Jewells took place using the CPH Rail Motors of the Rail Motor Society (Paterson, NSW) on 28 March 1987.

Following the closure of Lambton Colliery at Redhead, the last operating pit in the area in late 1991, the Belmont Branch was closed from 19 December 1991.

== Route (1940) ==
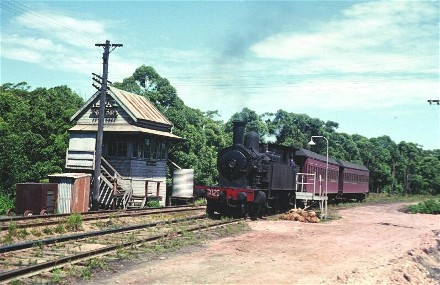
Fernleigh Loop

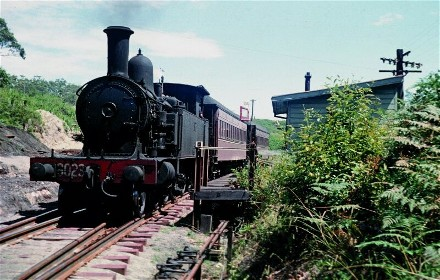
Dudley Junction

On leaving Adamstown station, the Belmont line branched off to the left, becoming single track immediately clear of the junction. It commenced to climb at 1 in 40 into hilly country and, in the valley on the left, could be seen branch lines off the main line to the New Lambton and Shortland collieries.

Winding into the hills, it came to the summit and a short tunnel immediately after which was situated Fernleigh Loop. Between Adamstown and the tunnel, an attempt had been made to duplicate the line and the derelict works could still be seen to the left of the line in 1940. Fernleigh Loop had Down and Up loops, one on each side of the main line. The lines here were on a sharp curve. There was no passenger platform, the only building being the signal box.

Still traversing hilly country, the line came to Kahibah, a single platform on the right-hand side and located on a reverse curve. The station buildings here, as at other places, were once painted chocolate colour and finished in cream.

Dudley Junction was the next "station," and, as the name implies, was the junction for the Dudley branch, a short line serving the Dudley colliery, with another connection to Burwood colliery yard. There was a signal box with a very short platform at the Adamstown end of the loop and another platform with a shelter, but no name, existed further along the loop to serve the miners from the Burwood colliery. Alongside the main line was a long loop siding with a crossover in the middle of it, and was used for staging northbound traffic.

Again rising, the line approached Whitebridge, a single platform on the left hand side and in the cutting the line reached the summit level of 295 ft (90 m) above sea level and 241 ft (73 m) above Adamstown.

From here the line descended at 1 in 40 with a number of 10-chain (200 m) curves to Redhead, a crossing station with island platform. This station was signalled for working on either road, passenger traffic normally using the left-hand road. On the left-hand side adjacent to the station was the Lambton Colliery with its large white buildings.

The next station we came to was Jewell's, and between it and Redhead were uncompleted duplication works, first on one and then on the other side of the line. A derelict colliery (Redhead) was also passed in this section. Jewell's had an island platform, but only the left hand side was used, the right-hand track being portion of the uncompleted duplication works long since abandoned. The station buildings here were in a deplorable condition, all windows, doors and about two-thirds of the weatherboards were missing and the platform was overgrown with grass and weeds.

Shortly after passing Jewell's, a branch line curved off to the right to the John Darling mine, the catch points to this siding actually joining the derelict duplication and by the layout it was apparently intended to work each road as an independent single line as far as Redhead.

Redhead was the only location on the branch where steam locomotives could take water. An elevated water tank was positioned at the southern end of the platform. A water column was provided on either side of the tank so that locomotives could take water whilst standing on either track.

The line now proceeded over marshy ground past a half-derelict platform on the right displaying no name but presumably for the miners from the adjacent John Darling colliery. A short distance beyond this platform was the Landmark signal for Belmont, which was about half-a-mile further on, and was the terminus of the line.

The station here consisted of a long platform on the right-hand side, with low buildings and offices. There was a run-round loop, a long goods siding and two additional sidings serving a colliery loading bank. The points at the approach end of the loop were unlocked by a key from the lever frame which worked all the other points.

The line was fully signalled and was worked on the Electric Staff system of the New South Wales Railways, the sections being:- Adamstown - Fernleigh Loop - Dudley Junction. - Redhead - Belmont, with an intermediate instrument at John Darling Junction. The Dudley branch was worked by Ordinary Train Staff, without tickets.

The line, for traffic purposes, was staffed and worked by the New South Wales Railways who also supplied motive power. The owners were responsible for the maintenance work of the line. Coal-dust and ashes formed a substitute for ballast and the riding qualities of the track were anything but smooth, the suburban cars lurching and rolling badly for practically the whole length of the trip.

The station buildings were badly in need of paint and the whole line had a general air of neglect. A tall, disused, lattice signal post was standing a short distance from the Adamstown end of the tunnel, and was apparently once the Down Distant signal.

At the end of the 1930s, the line suffered a severe reduction in its passenger service owing to the bus competition and also the difficulty in running sufficient coal trains to clear the collieries as, the hoppers all being non-air, much time was occupied in applying and releasing hand brakes en route.

== Current use ==
Following closure as a railway line, the corridor was converted into a combined bicycle and walking track, under the joint ownership of Newcastle City Council and Lake Macquarie City Council.
