= Adamstown railway station, New South Wales =

Railway station in New South Wales, Australia

Adamstown
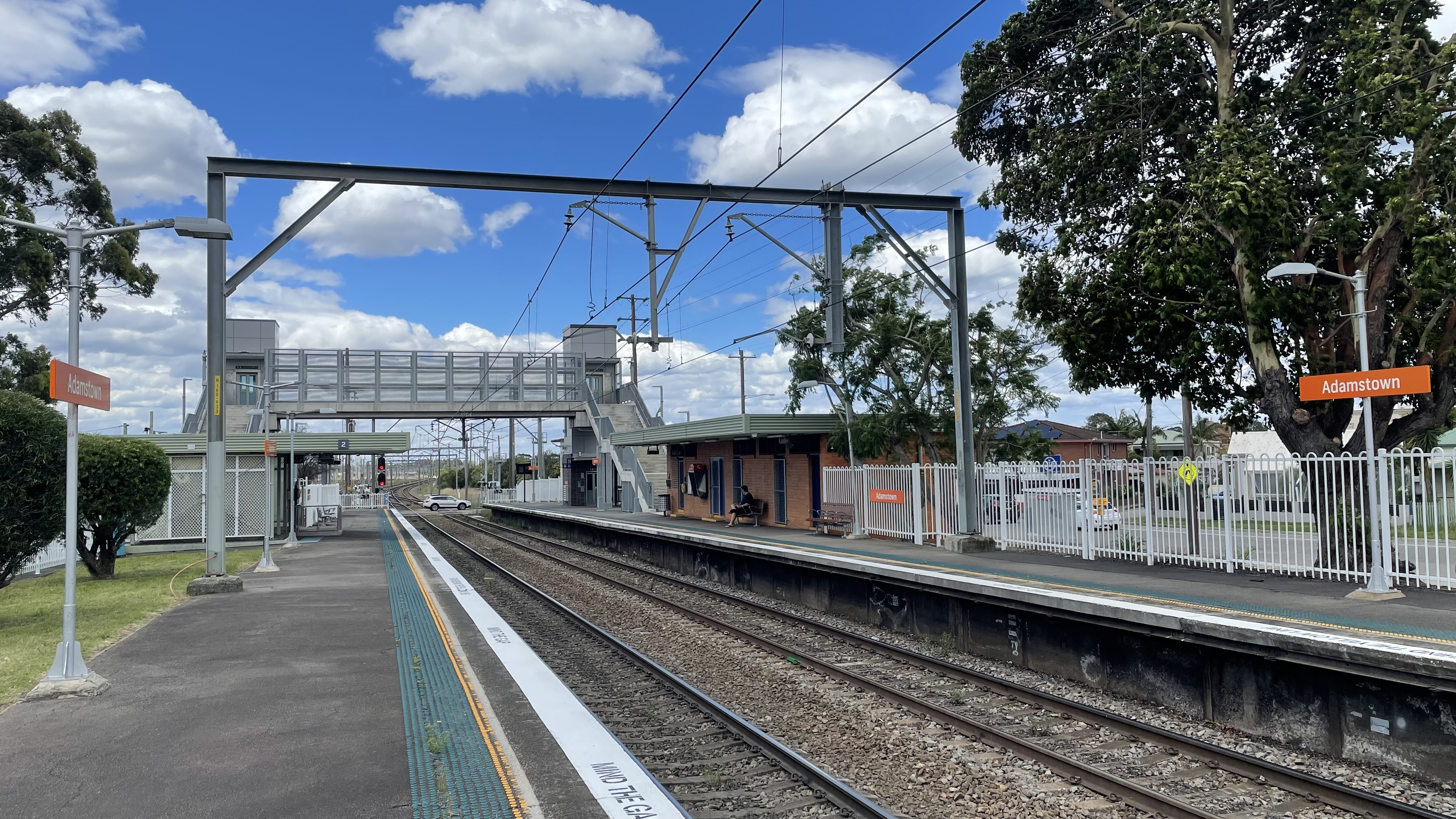
- North-east bound view from Platform 1, November 2021

General information
- Location: Park Avenue, Adamstown; Australia
- Coordinates: 32°56′02″S 151°43′12″E
- Owner: Transport Asset Manager of New South Wales
- Operator: Sydney Trains
- Line: Main Northern
- Distance: 161.12 km (100.12 mi) from Central
- Platforms: 2 side
- Tracks: 2
- Connections: Bus

Construction
- Structure type: Ground
- Accessible: Yes

Other information
- Station code: ADT
- Website: Transport for NSW

History
- Opened: 15 August 1887; 139 years ago

Passengers
- 2025: 53,198 (year); 146 (daily) (Sydney Trains, NSW TrainLink)

Services
Preceding station	Intercity Trains	Following station
Broadmeadow towards Newcastle Interchange	Central Coast & Newcastle Line	Kotara towards Central
Location
- Location within New South Wales

Adamstown railway station is a heritage-listed railway station located on the Main Northern line in New South Wales, Australia. It serves the southern Newcastle suburb of Adamstown, and was opened on 15 August 1887.

As part of the electrification of the line in the early 1980s, new station buildings were built, the western relief line and Platform 3 removed, and the 1939 built signal box on Platform 1 that used to control movements to the Belmont line decommissioned on 4 December 1983. Until December 1991, the Belmont line diverged to the south-east of the station.

The station was upgraded with new lifts and footbridge with work completed by late 2017.

In 2019, Platform 1 was extended to accommodate ten cars.

== Platforms and services ==
Adamstown has two side platforms and a third non-operational platform. It is serviced by Sydney Trains Intercity Central Coast & Newcastle Line services travelling between Sydney Central, Gosford and Newcastle.

Platform	Line	Stopping pattern	Notes
1	Central Coast & Newcastle Line	Services to Gosford & Sydney Central	
2	Central Coast & Newcastle Line	Services to Newcastle	

== Transport links ==
Newcastle Transport operates one bus route via Adamstown station, under contract to Transport for NSW:

- 14: Newcastle to Swansea Heads via Kotara, Charlestown and Belmont
