= St Francis Xavier's College, Hamilton =

Catholic secondary school in Australia

St Francis Xavier’s College Hamilton

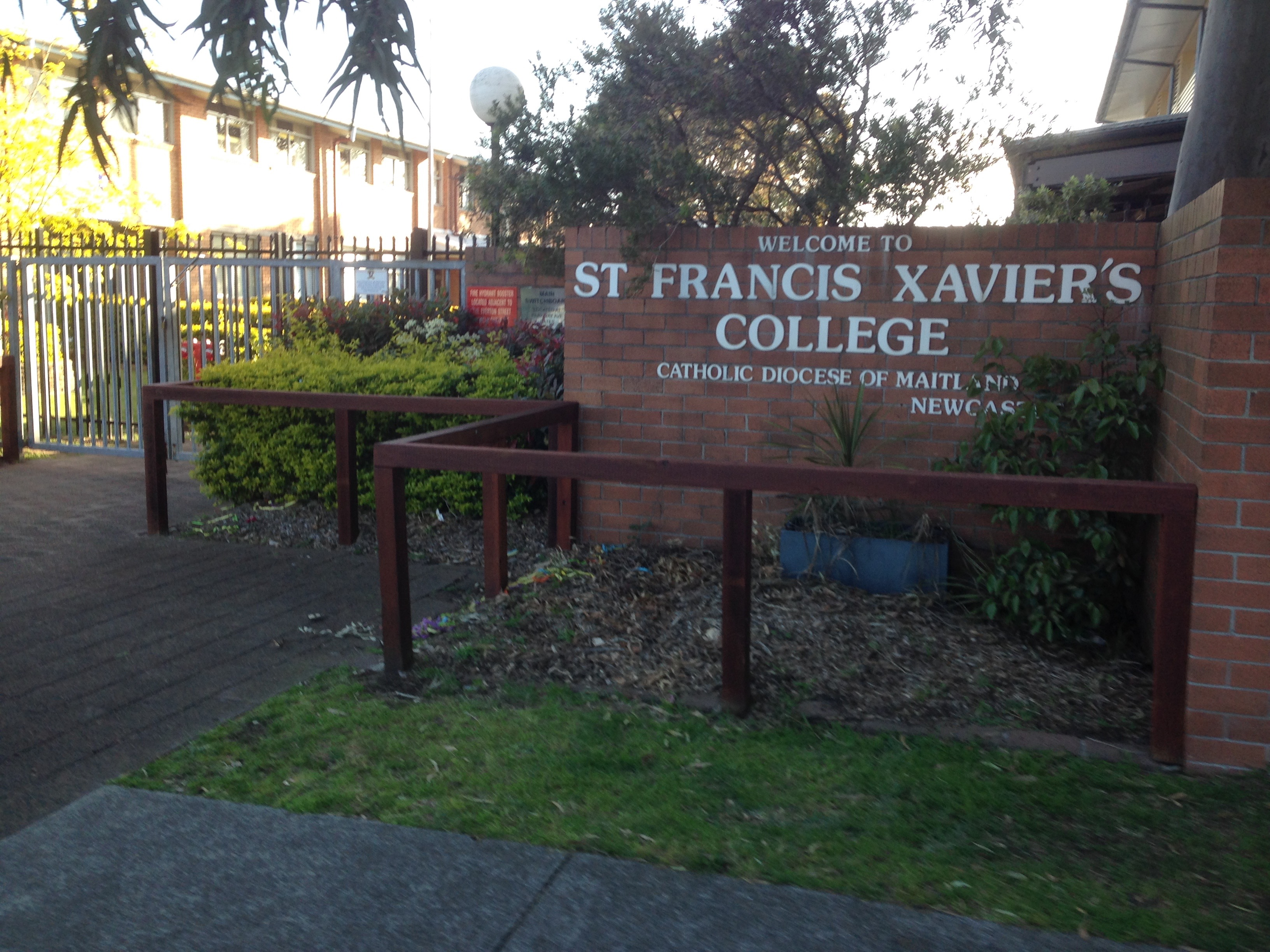
- Hebburn Street entrance of St Francis Xavier College

Location
- Hamilton, Newcastle, Australia, New South Wales, 2303; Australia; 32.9265°S 151.7543°E

Information
- Former name: Marist Brothers Hamilton
- Type: Private, secondary, Catholic
- Motto: Christus Lux Mea
- Religious affiliation: Catholicism
- Patron saint: Francis Xavier
- Established: 1985
- Status: Open
- Principal: Greg Ptolemy
- Staff: 128
- Grades: 7-9-11–12
- Enrolment: 967, as of 2023
- Language: English
- Houses: McAuley, Champagnat, Mackillop, Dominic
- Website: www.hamilton.catholic.edu.au

St Francis Xavier's College Hamilton is a Catholic secondary school located in Hamilton, New South Wales, Australia. Founded in 1985 by the Marist Brothers as a Years 7 to 10 boys high school, the school is now co-educational and offers a variety of subjects to students in Year Eleven and Twelve. The school's enrolment was about 850 in 1986 and exceeded 1,000 for the first time in 1994. The school's motto, "Christus Lux Mea", is Latin for "Christ My Light".

The school primarily accepts enrolments from surrounding junior Catholic high schools in the area, including San Clemente, Mayfield and St Pius X. Until 2018, the college also provided Year 11 and 12 for students enrolled at St Mary's High School.

The school has four houses: Champagnat (named after Marcellin Champagnat), Dominic (named after Saint Dominic), MacKillop (named after Mary Mackillop) and McAuley (named after Catherine McAuley).

== Notable alumni ==
Dave Gleeson, the Screaming Jets singer, met his band members while attending St Francis Xavier's College.

Australian rugby player Paul Dan is a former student and also a staff member as of 2022. Other sports people to attend the College include rugby league players: Danny Buderus, Anthony Tupou, Owen Craigie and Jarrod Mullen. Actress Sophie Lee graduated from the school in 1986.

== History ==
In the year 1989, the Newcastle Earthquake caused considerable damage, leading to some buildings completely lost.

== Curriculum ==
SFX offers classes in each of these categories:

- Religious Studies
- English
- Mathematics
- Science
- Human Society and its Environment (HSIE)
- Personal Development/Health/Physical Education (PDHPE)
- Technological and Applied Studies (TAS)
- Creative and Performing Arts (CAPA)
- Vocational Education & Training
- Languages Other Than English
- Life Skills
