= San Clemente High School, Mayfield =

San Clemente High School
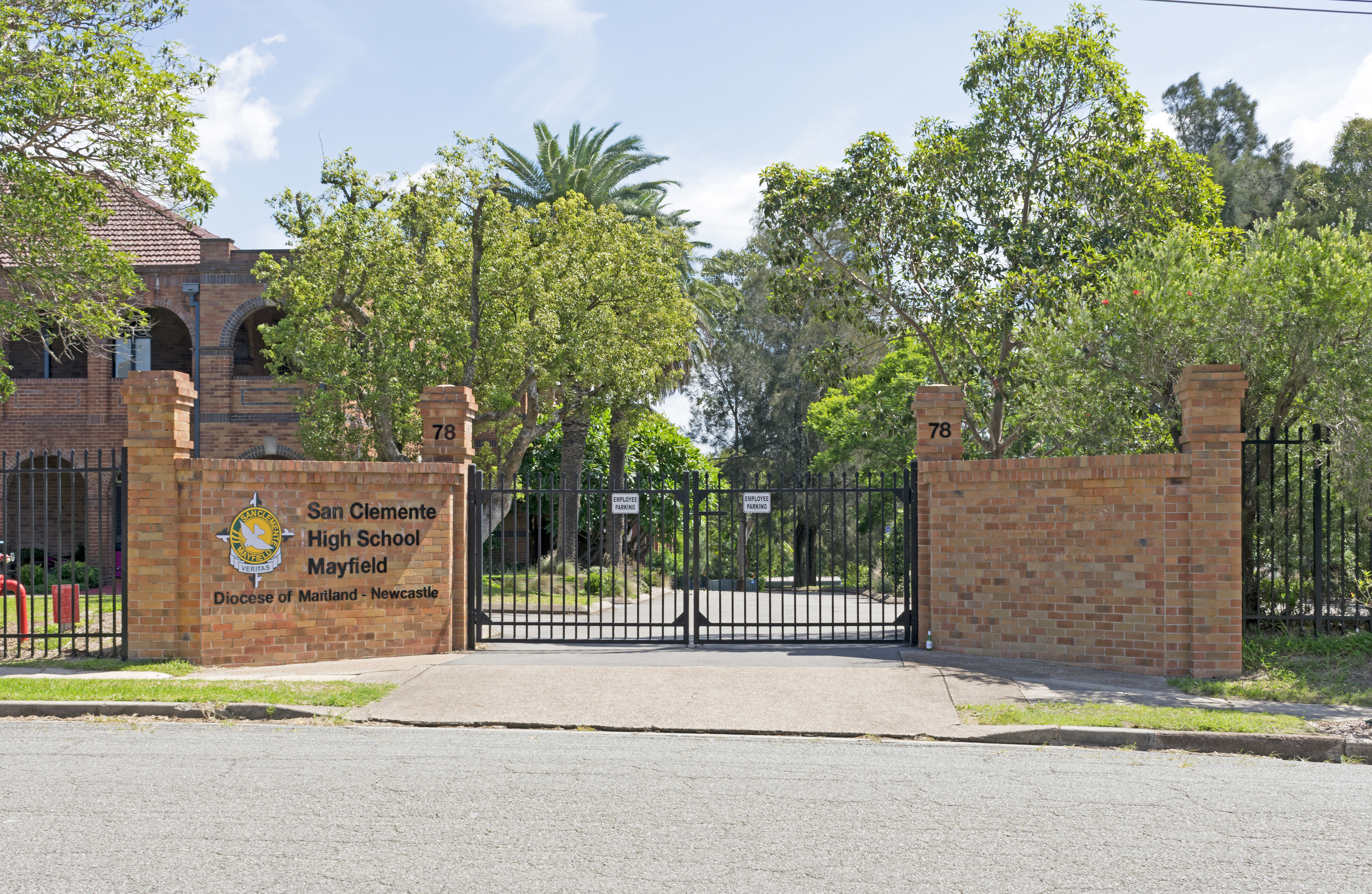

Location
- 78 Havelock Street; Mayfield, New South Wales, 2304; Australia; 32°53′46.33″S 151°44′36.08″E

Information
- Motto: Veritas (Truth)
- Founded: 1916
- Principal: Emma South
- Faculty: 56
- Years offered: 7–12
- Classes offered: Religious Studies, English, Science, Technology (Mandatory), Human Society and its Environment (Yr 7: Geography. Yr 8: History), Languages (French and Japanese), Personal Development/Health/Physical Education, Visual Arts, Music, Physical Activity and Sports Studies, Textiles, Commerce, Food Technology, Graphics technology, Information and software technology, Industrial technology (Metal), Industrial technology (Wood)
- Hours in school day: 6
- Campus: 1

San Clemente High School is a Catholic high school in the Mayfield area of Newcastle, New South Wales, Australia.

== History ==
In the year 1916, a small girls' school was founded by the Dominican Order of nuns in Kerr Street, Mayfield. Three years later the property previously known as "Redcliff" was purchased. The school was moved to its current location in Havelock Street, and became a secondary school for young ladies, run by the sisters of St Dominic.

In the 62 years that followed the school became well known as both a boarding school and a day school with various extensions and modifications.

In 1977, the school became the first high school in the Diocese of Maitland-Newcastle to be run completely by lay staff, when the last Dominican sisters left, and the first lay principal was appointed. At that time, the school had an enrolment of approximately 250 girls.

In 1983, the school became co-educational and the first boys were enrolled. In 2009, the school held an opening ceremony to celebrate the official opening of the new multimillion-dollar developments.
