= Coastal coal-carrying trade of New South Wales =

Maritime trade in New South Wales, Australia

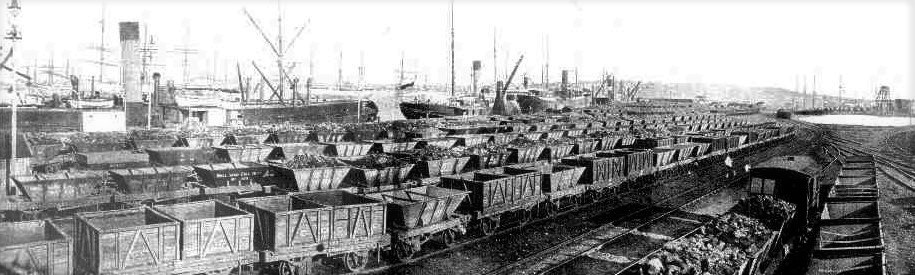
Loading coal at "the Dyke", Carrington, c. 1900

The coastal coal-carrying trade of New South Wales involved the shipping of coal—mainly for local consumption but also for export or coal bunkering—by sea to Sydney from the northern and southern coal fields of New South Wales. It took place in the 19th and 20th centuries. It should not be confused with the export coal trade, which still exists today. There was also an interstate trade, carrying coal and coke to other Australian states that did not have local sources of black coal.

Coal was found to the north and south of Sydney in the last years of the 18th century by colonial settlers. Coal seams run under Sydney but at great depth and mining these seams, although it was done for a time at the Balmain Colliery, proved impractical. As Sydney grew in size as a city and as a major port, coal was needed for steamships, town gas production and other industrial uses.

Small ships—colloquially called sixty-milers—carried coal to Sydney from coal ports that were established on the northern and southern coalfields of New South Wales. The coastal trade was well established by the time Sydney was first linked to the coalfields by railways. Significant customers for coal were situated on the foreshores of Sydney Harbour, the Parramatta River, and to a lesser extent Botany Bay. Steamships using Sydney loaded bunker coal there.

During the heyday of the coastal trade, Sydney was dependent upon a constant supply of coal arriving by sea, particularly for the production of town gas and for bunkering operations. As the uses of coal declined, so did the coastal trade in the last three decades of the 20th century. It ended finally, around the turn of the 21st century, and is now largely forgotten. Few remnants of the once extensive coastal coal-carrying trade exist today.

== Discovery of coal by colonists in New South Wales ==
Coal was used as a fuel by the Awabakal people, the original inhabitants and traditional owners of what is now Lake Macquarie and Newcastle. Their word for coal was "nikkin". Evidence of coal use has been found in beach and dune middens, on Lake Macquarie at Swansea Heads and Ham's Beach, and on the Central Coast at Mooney Beach.

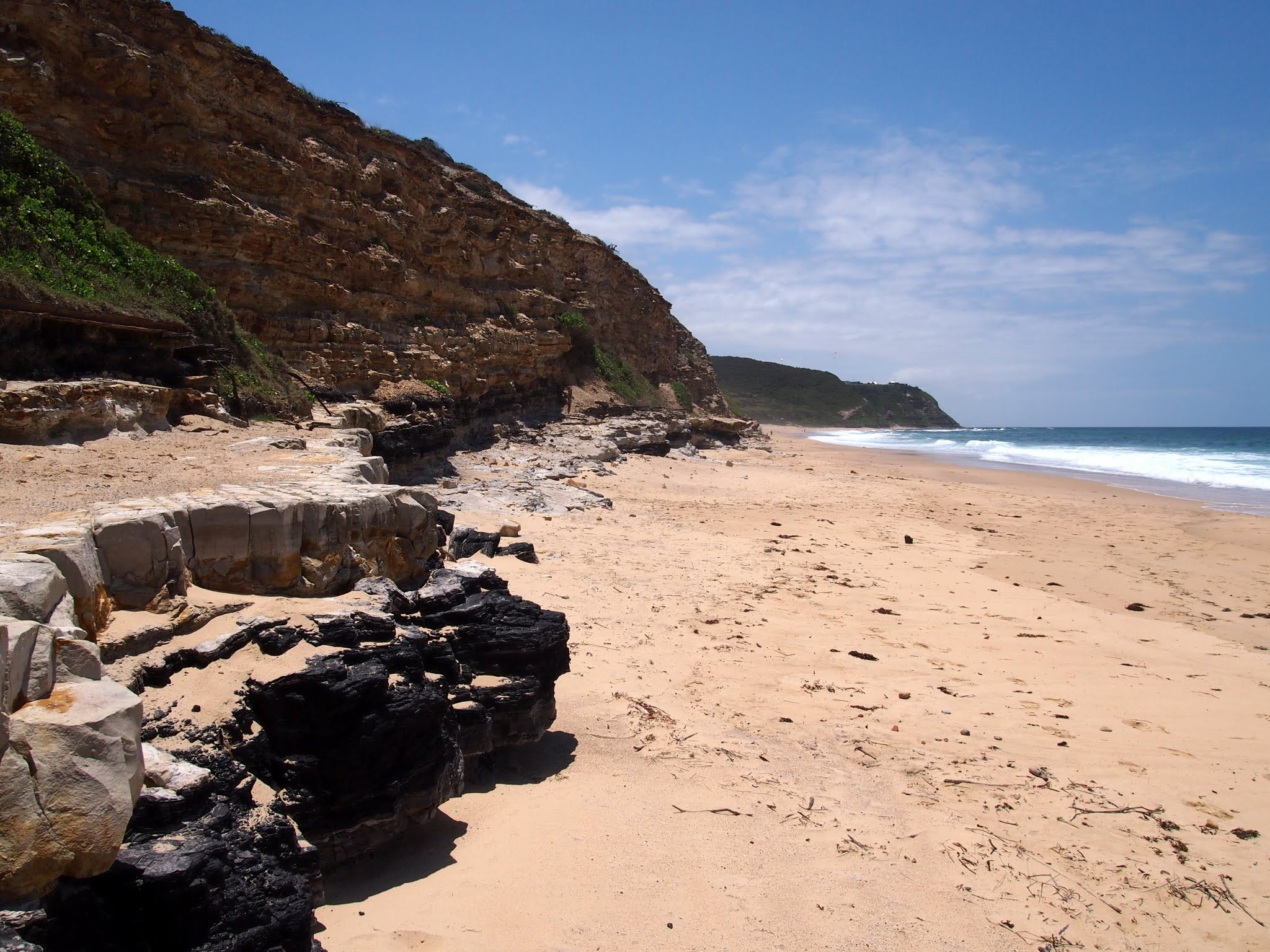
Coal seam outcrop, Glenrock State Conservation Reserve, near where coal was first used by escaped convicts in 1791

A group of escaped convicts led by a married couple William and Mary Bryant were the first Europeans to find and use Australian coal, at the end of March 1791. They found "fine burning coal" near a "little creek" with cabbage tree palms 'about 2 degrees' north of Sydney, "after two days sailing". This first hand account of the discovery—written by one of the party James Martin—was found in a collection of manuscripts and published in 1937. The escapees never returned to Sydney and their discovery of the coal remained unknown, until after they were recaptured at Kupang. William Bryant also wrote an account that is now lost but William Bligh—later a governor of New South Wales—saw it, when he visited Kupang in 1792. Bligh made a summary of Bryant's account in his log and quoted him as saying, "Walking along shore towards the entrance of the Creek we found several large pieces of Coal—seeing so many pieces we thought it was not unlikely to find a Mine, and searching about a little, we found a place where we picked up with an Ax as good Coals as any in England—took some to the fire and they burned exceedingly well". It is likely that the location was near the entrance to Glenrock Lagoon, where coal is exposed, low in the sea cliff, and which was later the site of the Burwood Colliery.

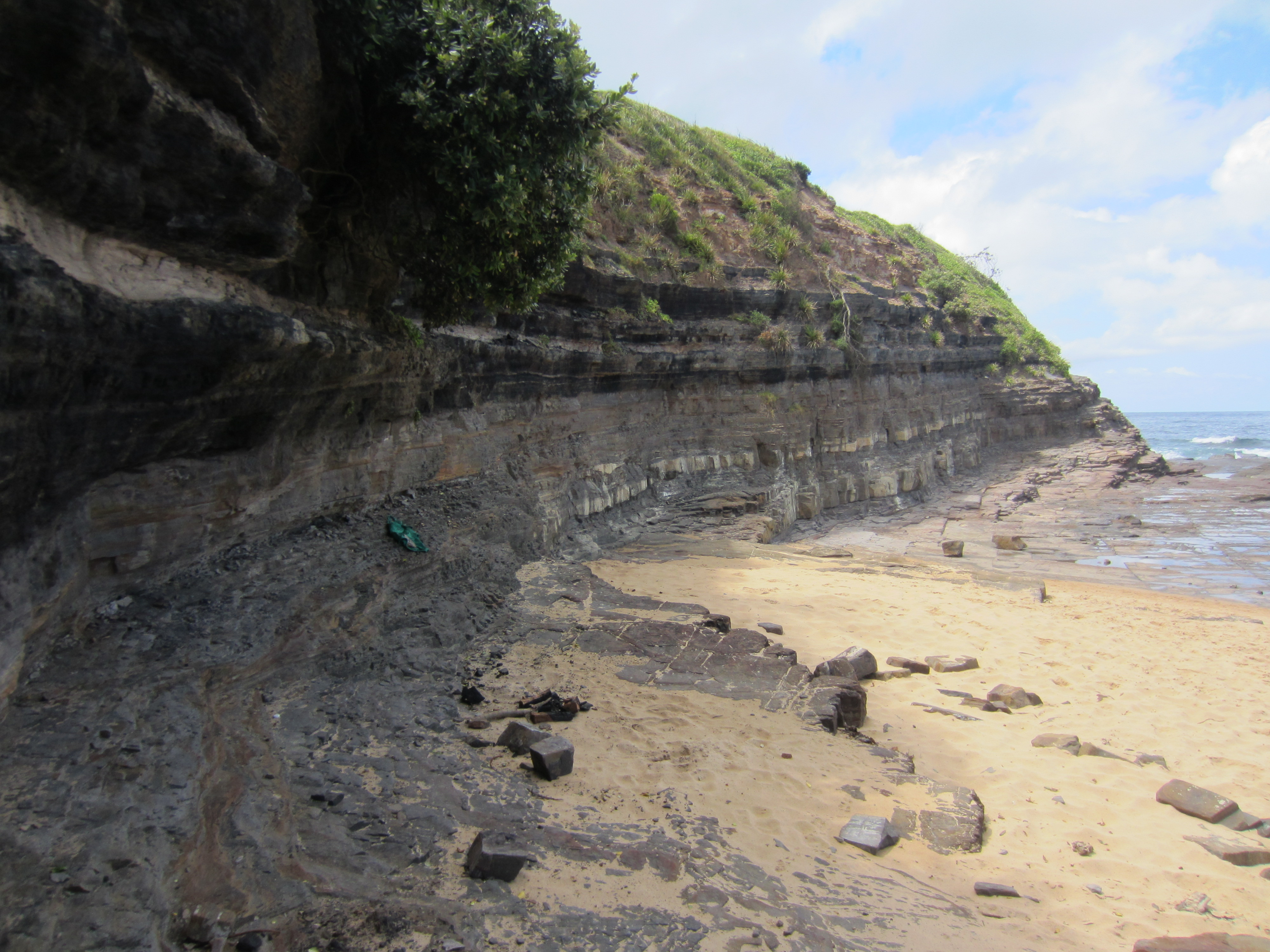
Coal seam outcrop at Bell's Point, at the northern end of Austinmer Beach. This is the coal seam noted by George Bass in 1797.

Survivors of the wreck of the Sydney Cove reported seeing coal south of Sydney, after completing their 700 km trek along the coast in May 1797. The explorer George Bass was tasked to confirm the discovery, and, in July 1797, he reported seeing a coal seam "six foot deep in the face of a steep cliff which was traced for eight miles in length" (Sites where coal outcrops are visible along the coast south of Sydney include Coalcliff, where coal outcrops in the sea-cliff, and near the ocean pool at Wombarra and at Bell's Point and Brickyard Point, both at Austinmer, where coal outcrops in the headlands.)

In September of the same year, Lieutenant John Shortland reported coal outcropping on the southern side of the Hunter River—first known as the Coal River—near to its mouth, at what is now Newcastle. Shortland's "discovery" may have been prompted by an earlier report—provided by a party of fishermen in 1796—of a river with coal, to the north of Sydney and south from Port Stephens, but he is credited with the discovery of the Hunter River and the northern coalfields.

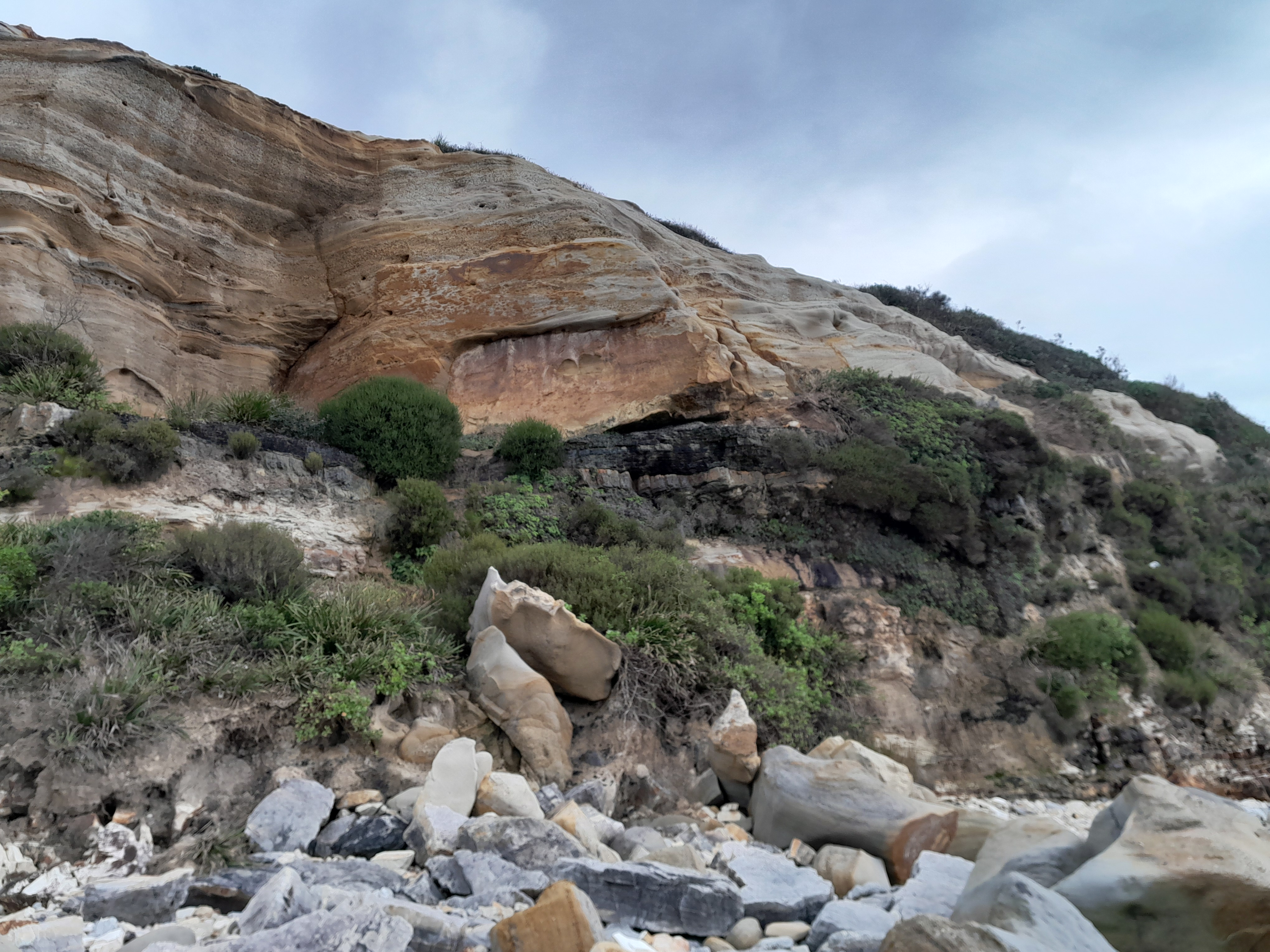
Upper coal seam outcrop in the sea cliff at Reid's Mistake, Swansea Heads.

In July 1800, Captain William Reid—mistaking Moon Island for Nobbys Head and the entrance to Lake Macquarie at Swansea Heads for the mouth of the Hunter River—obtained his cargo of coal for Sydney from a seam outcropping in the southern headland at the lake's entrance—a headland since known as "Reid's Mistake"—and so accidentally revealed to the settlers the coastal coalfields of Lake Macquarie. Awabakal people had used the coal at Swansea Heads for over a thousand years. It was only upon his return to Sydney that Reid found that he had not travelled far enough north to have reached the Hunter River.

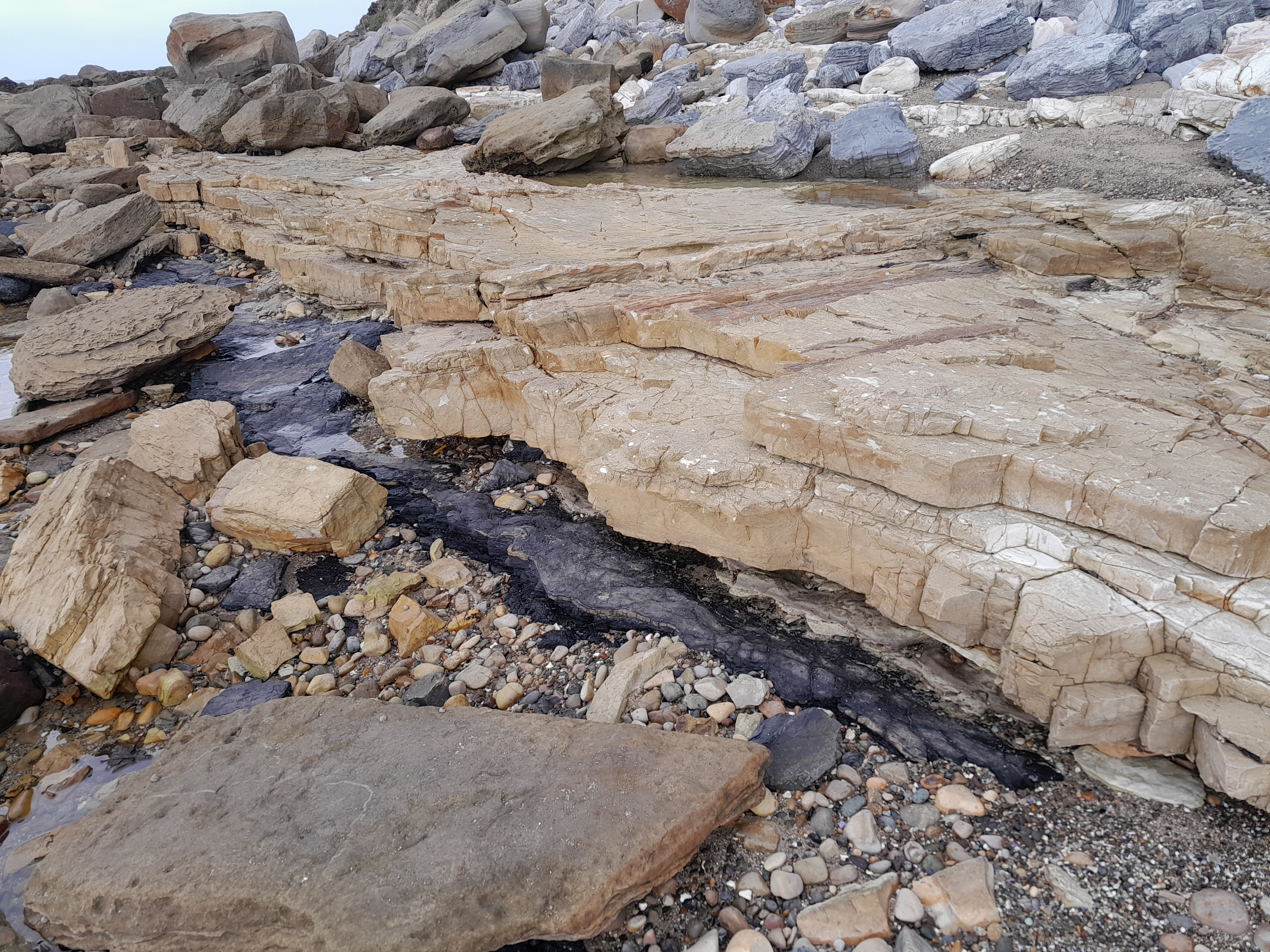
Lower coal seam outcrop in the rock platform, Reid's Mistake, Swansea Heads.

Coal was also found during July 1801 by the expedition, led by Lieutenant-Colonel William Paterson, to the Hunter Valley inland from Newcastle. This area would later become the vast South Maitland Coalfields.

The discovery of the western coalfields did not occur until after the Blue Mountains had been crossed in 1813. Coal outcrops low in the cliffs of some valleys of the Blue Mountains and on their western side near Lithgow. In fact, it is the erosion of these relatively soft coal measures that results in the sandstone cliff faces so characteristic of the Blue Mountains. William Lawson found what he thought was coal near Mt York, in the area later known as Hartley Vale, in 1822, but it was actually oil shale. However, at least by 1832, an attempt had been made to mine coal near the western base of Mount York, in the Vale of Clwydd, but it was found impractical due to transport difficulties. Apart from limited local use, western coal could not be exploited until the railway from Sydney crossed the Blue Mountains in 1869, and soon after that there were mines in the area around Lithgow.

By 1847, especially through the work of a clergyman and geologist, William Branwhite Clarke, it was a becoming understood that there was a major coal resource, at widely dispersed locations within the Sydney Basin.

That coal had been found so readily, by colonial settlers with no experience of mining and little knowledge of their new country, so soon after the first European settlement, implied that the resource was widespread and plentiful. That proved true; an immense coal resource existed in New South Wales. Coal is still being mined within the Sydney Basin more than two centuries later. Some individual mines had been worked for well over a century. Indeed, it is only the more recent increased rate of extraction—for the export market—that will see the exhaustion of commercially viable reserves that can be extracted without unacceptable environmental damage, before the middle of the 21st century.

== Reasons for the trade ==
=== Coal for Sydney ===
Coal was needed in Sydney to feed the production of town gas (from 1841 to 1971), as bunker coal for steamships, and as fuel for industrial and hospital heating boilers. Brickworks were a significant user of coal as a fuel. In the C19th and very early C20th, there was also some demand for coal as a fuel for domestic heating. Some coal also was trans-shipped and exported from Sydney.

Coal seams extend under Sydney but the huge depth of these seams has resulted in only very limited mining activity in Sydney. The coal seams of the Sydney Basin outcrop to the north, south and west of Sydney. The Metropolitan Colliery, 45 km south of Sydney at Helensburgh, is the closest commercially viable coal mine.

Given the short distances involved, it is not immediately obvious why coal would be carried to Sydney by sea. Not all coal consumed in Sydney arrived by ship; the railways also carried coal to Sydney. However, the main railway lines from Sydney to the north and south were not completed until the 1880s, largely due to the significant work needed to carry those railways across the Hawkesbury and Georges rivers. By that time, some mines were already well established and connected to nearby ports by local rail lines, the shipping trade was well established, and many major customers already had facilities on the waterfront of the natural port of Sydney Harbour and were without a rail siding. Some mines had been designed to ship coal by sea only, for example Coalcliff (up to 1910), the Wallarah Colliery at Catherine Hill Bay, and the two collieries on the left bank of the Hunter River, at Tomago and Stockton. Most of the local rail lines to the mines were privately owned and used rolling stock that was not to the standards expected of main line rail operations—for example wagons without air brakes—and operation over government-owned lines was restricted to specific lines and not allowed on others.

Coal bunkering of steamships in Sydney Harbour was a natural fit for the coastal coal trade. Sixty-milers could moor alongside a steamship and directly transfer coal to the ship's bunkers. In 1909, the first of three mechanised coal hulks that would coal ships in Sydney was introduced. After 1920, coal could be off-loaded and ships bunkered at the purpose-built bunkering facility, the Ball's Head Coal Loader. Coal bunkering also took place at a "coal wharf" at Pyrmont.

The New South Wales Government Railways were large users of coal, after the first steam-powered railway in New South Wales opened in 1855. But once the railway from Sydney reached the western coal-fields in 1869, and later the other coal fields, they had no need for coal carried in ships. In 1916, the Railway Commissioners set up their own mine, the Railway Mine, later known as the State Mine, on the western coal-fields at Lithgow. Coal was carried by rail to coal stages—ranging from massive structures to small stockpiles—at locations where steam locomotives were refuelled.

Four of the electrical power stations in Sydney—Bunnerong on Botany Bay, and White Bay, Pyrmont and Ultimo on Sydney Harbour—were supplied with coal by rail. All these power stations were situated close to the waterfront but that was to obtain cooling water not port access. Two of the power stations—Ultimo and White Bay—initially were operated by the railways and tramways and all the power stations in Sydney were built after the rail connections from the coalfields to Sydney were completed. While the Bunnerong Power Station was being built, drilling was carried out to a depth of 2,730 feet (832 m) in an attempt to find suitable coal below the area of the power station site; although a seam of "burnt" coal—destroyed by an intruding volcanic dyke—was found at a depth of 2,600 feet (792 m), these efforts were unsuccessful, and it too was supplied with its coal by rail.

The other power station, at Balmain—originally owned by Electric Light and Power Supply Corporation—had no rail siding. It was coal-fired but also raised some steam by incinerating garbage. Its coal was landed from barges at the waterfront until 1965 and at least some of the coal for the Balmain Power Station came by sea; around 1919 that included coal from the Cardiff Colliery, which was shipped from Lake Macquarie.

=== Coal and coke for the other states ===
In parallel to the coastal trade to Sydney, there was an interstate coastal trade in coal and coke from the same ports to other Australian states, particularly Victoria, South Australia and Tasmania where black coal was needed for steamship coal bunkering, rail transport and industrial purposes and coke was needed for smelting ores.

One notable early interstate trade, from 1866 to around 1893, was that between the Hunter River and the operations of the South Australian Copper-mining Company, at Wallaroo, in South Australia. Coal was carried from Port Waratah to Wallaroo, for use in smelting higher-grade copper ore. At Wallaroo, the empty colliers were loaded with low-grade copper ore, as ballast. The 'ballast' was then unloaded at Port Waratah, where it was smelted at the Port Waratah Copper Works, which had been established by the company for that purpose. That arrangement improved the overall economics of the company's operations, by ensuring that the colliers never made any trip without a cargo and reducing the amount of coal that otherwise would need to be shipped to Wallaroo. In the 20th century, a similar operating arrangement would develop, after the opening of BHP's Whyalla Steelworks.

== Ships ==
=== Sixty-milers ===
A sixty-miler enters Newcastle Harbour in 1923

Coal was carried to Sydney in ships known as sixty-milers. The name refers to the approximate distance by sea—actually 64 nautical miles—from the Hunter River mouth at Nobbys Head to the North Head of Sydney Harbour.

The heyday of the sixty-milers was from around 1880 to the 1960s. The Royal Commission of 1919-1920 identified that twenty-nine ships were engaged in the coastal coal-carrying trade in 1919.

=== Interstate ships ===
There was some overlap in the ships used in the two coastal coal trades. Typically, the interstate ships were larger than most sixty-milers and, due to making relatively longer voyages, needed larger crews to cover multiple shifts and a larger coal bunker capacity. However, small ships, typical sixty-milers but with larger crews, were also used in the interstate trade.

=== Ship owners and operators ===
In the earlier years of the trade, there were many owners and operators, sometimes just owning or operating on charter just one vessel. Owners of the sixty-milers, during this period, most typically were coal-mines (such as Coalcliff Colliery and Wallarah Colliery), or coal-shippers or merchants (such as Scott Fell & Company, GS Yuill & Co), The southern coalfield collieries (Coalcliff Collieries, etc.) owned their own ships but most were chartered to the Southern Coal Owner's Agency, which operated the ships. Later companies that both owned coal mines and were also coal merchants (such as RW Miller and Howard Smith) owned ships and ownership became more concentrated.

In the later years of the trade, one of the dominant owners was R. W. Miller and its successor companies. However, due to company takeovers and cross-ownership between RW Miller, Howard Smith and Coal & Allied, it is somewhat difficult to track ownership of vessels and loading assets of these firms. In 1989, Howard Smith took full ownership of RW Miller. Another dominant owner in the later years of the trade was the Melbourne shipping company McIlwraith, McEacharn & Co, owners of the sixty-milers whose names included "Bank" (Mortlake Bank, etc.) Ownership was sometimes difficult to follow; the Hexham Bank may have been described as an RW Miller ship when in fact it was on charter to that company from its actual owners McIlwraith, McEacharn & Co. Ships of course were bought and sold and changed ownership, while still carrying coal cargoes for their new owners; sometimes the change in ownership also resulted in the ship's name changing, such as when the Corrimal became the Ayrfield.

In contrast to the sixty-milers, the owners of the interstate coastal ships were usually more traditional ship-owners, some of whom specialised in carrying coal and coke.

== Coal ports & operations ==
=== Northern Coalfields – Hunter Valley & Lake Macquarie region ===
Coal from the northern coalfields was loaded at Hexham on the Hunter River, Carrington (The Basin, The Dyke) and Stockton near Newcastle, on Lake Macquarie, and at the ocean jetty at Catherine Hill Bay. In the early years of the trade, coal was loaded at Newcastle itself, on the southern bank of the Hunter River, at the river port of Morpeth, and at a wharf at Reid's Mistake at Swansea Heads.

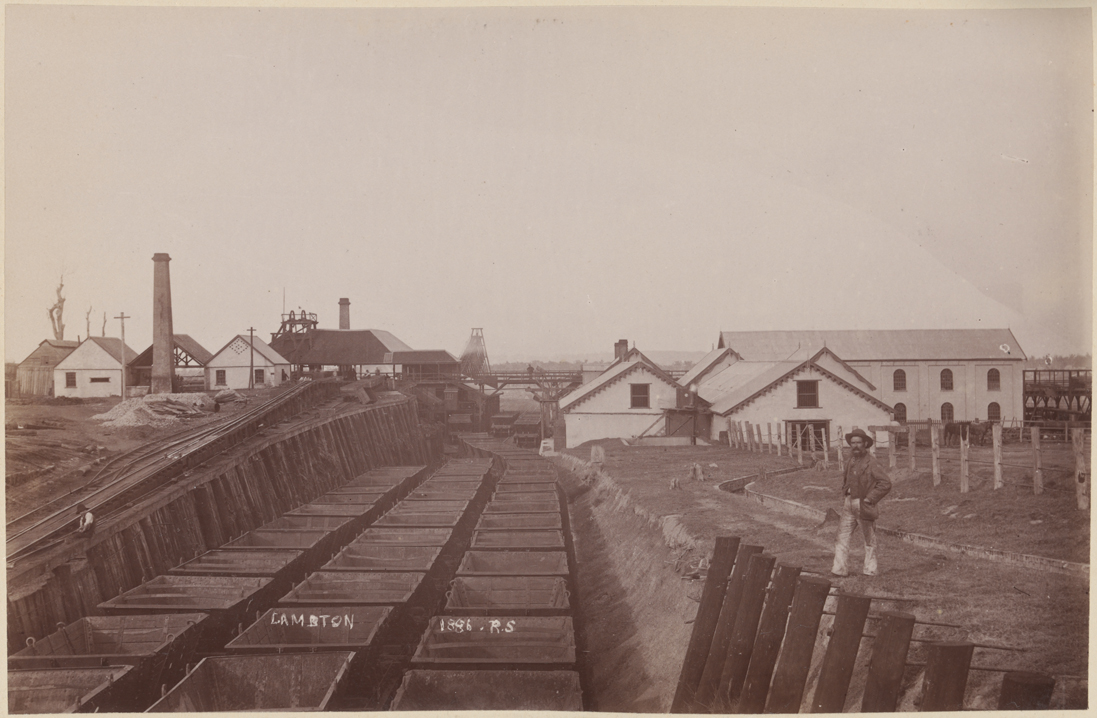
Lambton Coliery in 1886, with rakes of empty "non-air" wagons in the foreground. (Photographer: Ralph Snowball)

The coalfields to the north of Sydney had the advantage that the Hunter River and its estuary, while not ideal, could be used as a port. Mining commenced on the northern fields first. The first coal mines were initially operated by the government using convict labour. Sporadic mining operations started around what is now Newcastle and, in 1799, a cargo of coal was shipped to Bengal aboard the Hunter. The first "permanent" mine at Newcastle was opened in 1804.

When Newcastle ceased to be a penal colony in 1821, the government continued to operate the mines. Commissioner Bigge had recommended that the mines be given over to private operation. In 1828, there was an agreement struck between the Secretary of State for colonies and the Australian Agricultural Company that made coal mining a monopoly of that company. One other company was able to persuade the government to allow it to mine coal from 1841, the Ebenezer Colliery at Coal Point on Lake Macquarie.

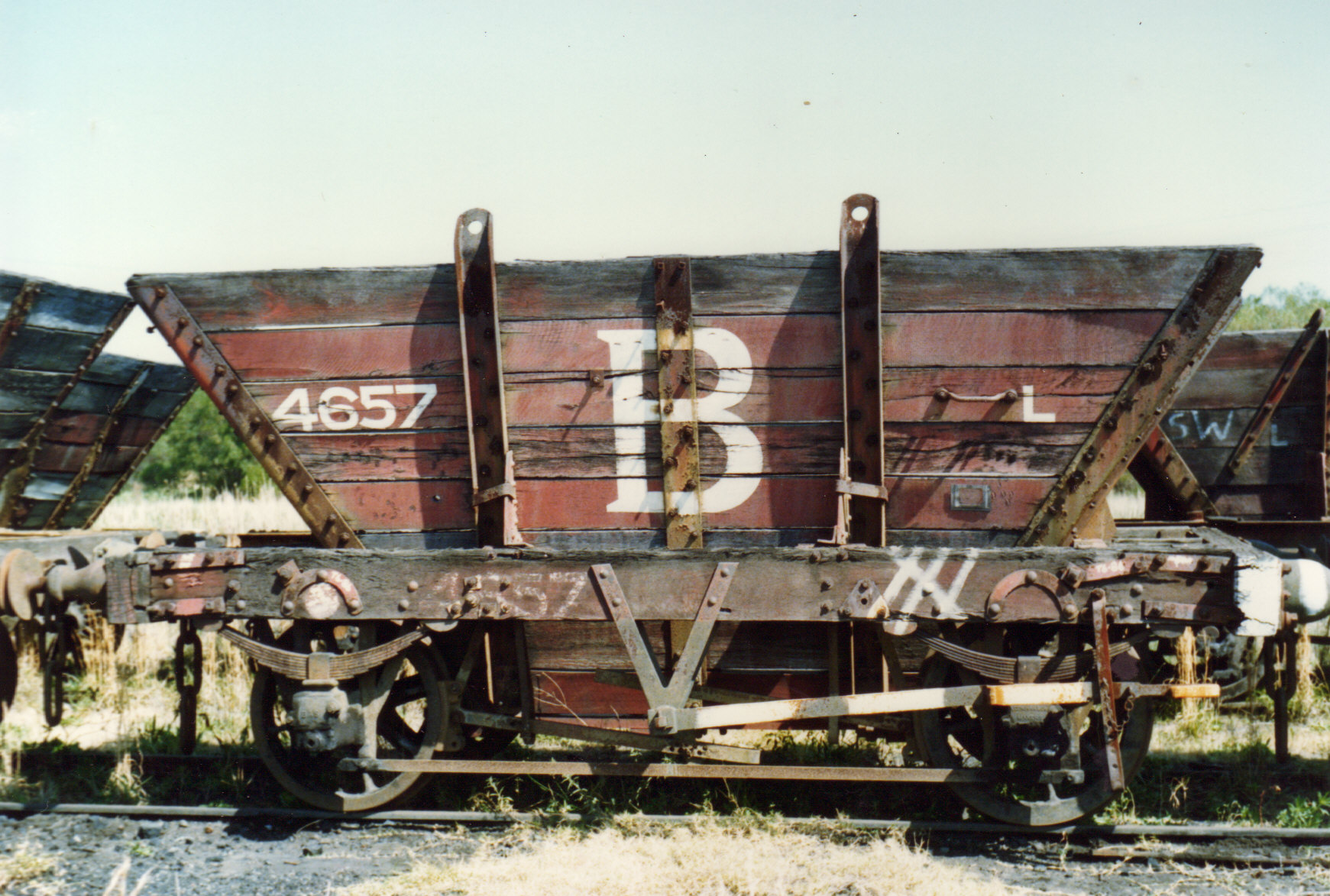
Four-wheel "non-air" coal wagon at Hexham in 1990. The lugs at the top were used to lift the removable hopper out of the frame by crane.

The monopoly was broken when challenged in 1847 by the Brown family, who began mining coal at Maitland and using the river port of Morpeth. They undercut the price of coal mined by the AAC. Coal was accessible in many places throughout the Hunter Valley and on both the eastern and western shores of Lake Macquarie. Once the monopoly was broken, many mines were soon in operation throughout the northern coalfields.

The known coal reserves of the northern coalfields were greatly increased, in 1886, when Professor T. W. Edgeworth David discovered the Greta coal seams, the coal resource which allowed a rapid expansion of coal mining on the South Maitland Coalfields.

At the end of the 19th century, the four most important companies on the northern field were the Australian Agricultural Company, J & A Brown, Newcastle Wallsend, and Scottish Australian (Lambton Colliery). Of these, only the Scottish Australian was not a member of the Associated Northern Collieries. This was essentially a cartel that divided production as quotas for each of the participating colliery owners. There was a monetary mechanism under which collieries selling above their quota compensated those selling under their quota. To avoid companies just leaving coal in the ground, quotas were adjusted based on actual sales for the previous year. The arrangement was known as "the Vend" and operated for most of the years between 1872 and 1893, when it collapsed due to competition in the export market.

Many collieries on the northern coalfield of NSW were named after collieries in the United Kingdom. Other names referenced the coal seam being mined and that confused the locality and identity of the mine further. With changes of ownership, mine names often changed and sometimes names associated with good-quality coal were moved to completely different collieries.

Most mines of the northern coalfields were connected to the ports at Hexham and Carrington by an extensive network of railway lines; some were government lines and others were privately owned. Coal was loaded into four-wheel wagons owned by the mining companies. The type of four-wheel wagon used consisted of a frame with wheels and a removable wooden hopper. Trains of wagons were hauled to the port, where the removable hoppers were lifted out of the frame by a crane and dumped by opening the bottom of the hopper. The worker who opened the hopper was known as a 'pin boss', probably because he used a large hammer to knock out a locking pin that secured the hopper gate.

The wagons were known as "non-air" wagons because they did not have air brakes. At their peak, there were 13,000 of these "non-air" wagons in service, belonging to around sixty operators. Larger modern bogie wagons were introduced in the 1960s and "non-air" wagons were banned from Port Waratah in 1974 but continued to be used to bring coal to Hexham. There were still 3,000 in use in 1975 and 900 when the Richmond Vale Railway closed in September 1987. "Non-air" wagons came in different capacities between 7 and 12.5 tons. Large letters on the side of the wagon identified the owner, and small letters its capacity.

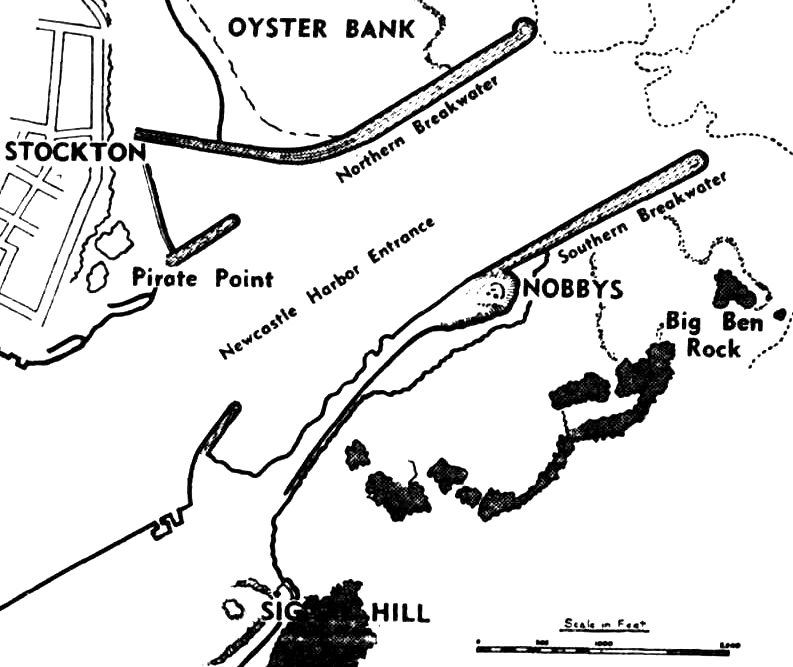
Map of the mouth of Hunter River, after construction of the breakwaters.

==== Hunter River ports ====
Ships bound for the river ports of Newcastle (Port Hunter), Stockton, Carrington, Port Waratah, Hexham and Morpeth had first to enter the river mouth between Nobbys Head and Stockton

The mouth of the Hunter was difficult for sailing ships heading south to Sydney. Sailing ships leaving port could not negotiate the east-north-east facing channel leaving the river, when winds favourable to a southern passage were blowing. From 1859, these ships were towed out by steam tugs and the situation improved. From May 1866, ships entering the port could align with two 'leading light' beacon towers; a red tower with a white light and a white tower with a light. One tower was at a higher elevation, viewed as a pair they were intended to provide a correct heading to enter the channel at the harbour entrance. When one beacon appeared over the other, the heading was correct. However, some saw the lights as being of dubious value, and noted that the horizontal distance between the two towers was insufficient to provide an accurate heading. New 'leading lights' entered service in 1918. The construction of the breakwater and land reclamation between Nobbys Head and Newcastle increased the safety of the port.

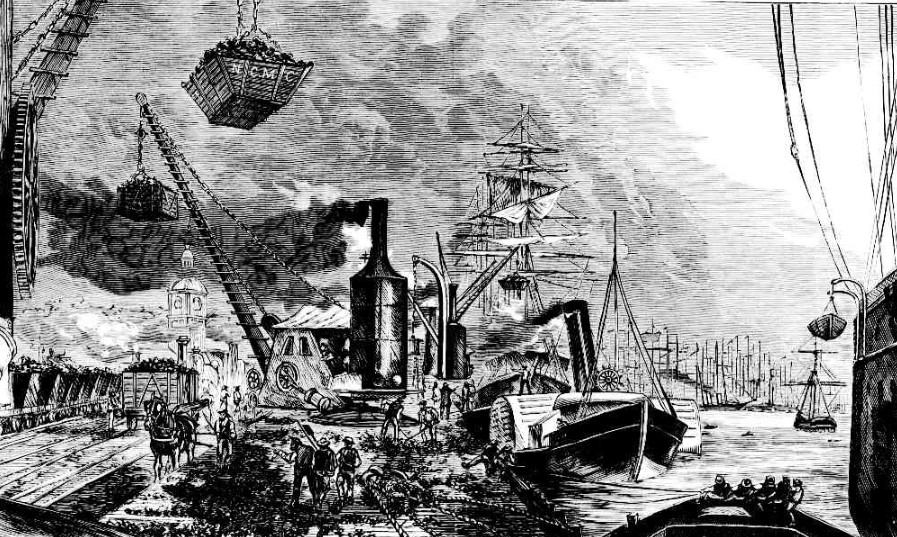
Shipping coal at Newcastle c. 1878. Steam-cranes are lifting the removable hoppers from the rail wagons. The building in the left background is the newly completed Newcastle Customs House.

Just to the north of the river mouth is the notorious Oyster Bank, actually a series of shifting sandbanks. At least 34 vessels were lost on the Oyster Bank. The shape of Nobby's was altered by lowering its height, so that its wind shadow did not cause sailing ships to lose steerage and end up on the Oyster Bank. Construction of the northern breakwater somewhat reduced the hazard to shipping entering the river. Around the same time as the northern breakwater was built over the Oyster Bank, a southern breakwater was extended from Nobby's on the southern side of the river, using material taken from the top of Nobby's.

The shallowness of the entrance to the Hunter River continued to be a limitation on shipping into the 1920s and a hazard during bad weather. Work continued to improve the river mouth, during the 1930s, culminating in the excavation of a deep channel 600 feet wide, with 27 feet of water depth, effectively removing the rock bar at the river's mouth. The improvements to the river entrance were a major engineering project for their time and a paper on the work won a Telford Premium award from the Institution of Civil Engineers for Percy Allan in 1921.

===== Newcastle (Port Hunter) =====
Coal was shipped from Newcastle to Sydney, from around 1801 onward. Initially mines were located in what is now the inner-city of Newcastle and coal was loaded from wharves on the southern bank of the Hunter River. Newcastle was the main port, during the time of the Australian Agricultural Company's monopoly on the mining of coal (1828–1847). The Australian Agricultural Company built the first rail line in Australia, from its mines to the Newcastle port.

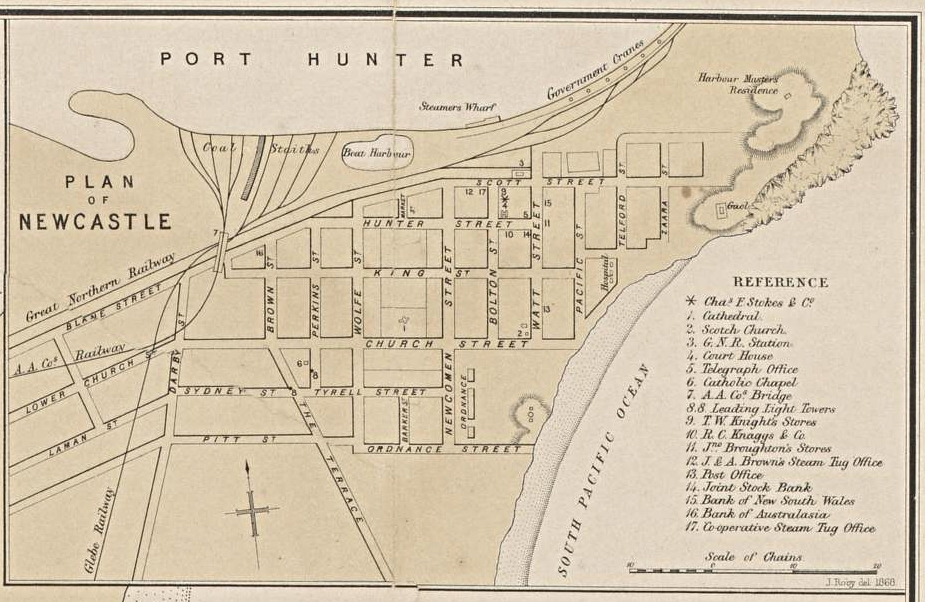
Map of Newcastle in 1868. The locations of coal staithes and the six steam cranes on the Government Wharf (Queens Wharf) are shown.

By the 1860s, Newcastle was a busy coal port with both the privately owned coal staiths and the government-owned Queen's Wharf in operation. The Queen's Wharf (often but not always known as King's Wharf, from 1901 to 1952) was connected to the Great Northern Railway—opened as far as East Maitland in 1857—and had six steam cranes used for loading coal. The westernmost staithes were the privately owned staithes of Australian Agricultural Company, which were connected to their private railway line. The staithes to their east were connected to the Great Northern Railway and to the Glebe Railway.

With the completion of the port at nearby Carrington and the decline of coal mining in Newcastle itself, the importance of the old port of Newcastle as a coal port decreased greatly. Steam cranes were relocated from Newcastle to the Dyke at Carrington and two of the cranes went to Stockton.

===== Morpeth =====
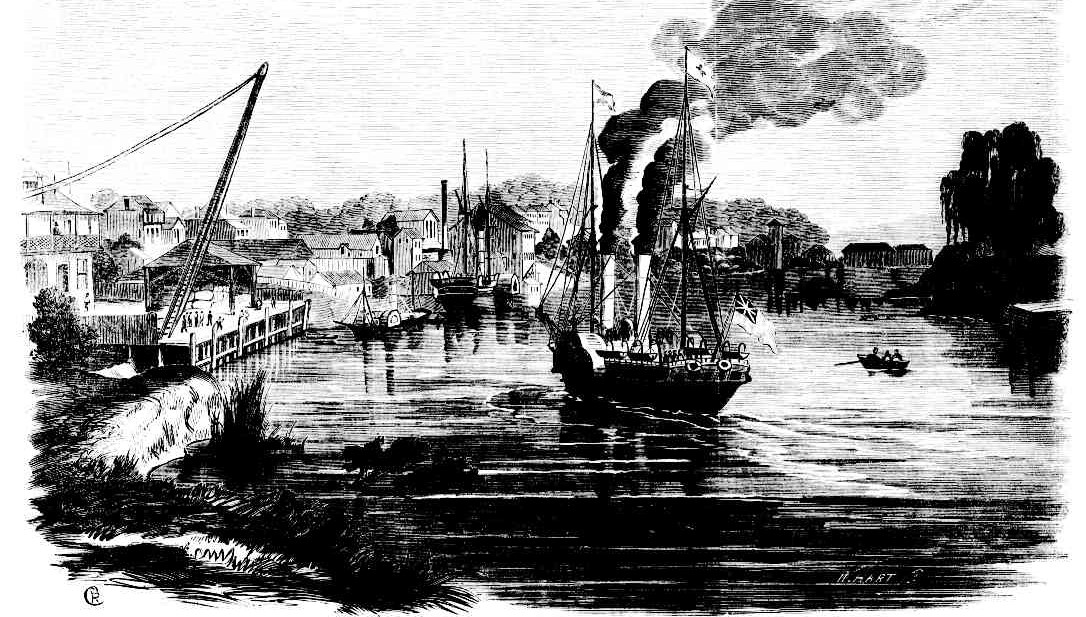
Morpeth c. 1865, during its heyday as a river port (unknown engraver, Illustrated Sydney News, 16 October 1865, p. 5)

The river port at Morpeth on the Hunter River was used to load coal mined in the Maitland area by J & A Brown from around 1843. Coal was also needed to recoal steamers at the port.

Although it lies far downstream from the tidal limit, Morpeth was the effective head of navigation of the Hunter, because farther upstream there were many large bends in the river between Morpeth and Maitland. Aside from greatly increasing the distance by water to Maitland, these bends were difficult for vessels to navigate. It also lay just upstream of the confluence of the Hunter River and the Paterson River, below which the river broadens. Morpeth had been a river port from the 1830s.

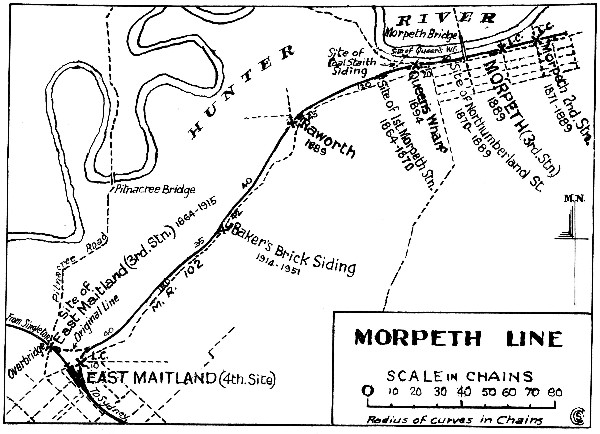
Map of the East Maitland to Morpeth Railway Line showing the location on the coal staiths and the siding. Note the bends in the river above Morpeth.

The importance of Morpeth as a port began to decline, once the railway from Newcastle reached East Maitland in 1857. A branch railway to the old port was opened in 1864. There were coal staiths and a railway siding for these at Morpeth. These new staiths were still unfinished in early 1866. Once completed, the Morpeth coal staithes were used, but infrequently. By the late 1870s, little coal had been loaded there and, by the late 1880s, the coal staiths were in a derelict and dangerous condition. Construction of the Morpeth Bridge, downstream of the staiths, in 1896 to 1898, ended any possibility of their revival, as only very small steamers could pass under it. Morpeth continued as a port but mainly for agricultural products.

Morpeth was disadvantaged by its distance up river, the shallowness of the river, and the impact of river floods. It was overtaken, as a coal port, by the downstream river ports at Newcastle, Hexham, and Carrington, which had better railway connections to the coalfields, could handle greater volumes and larger vessels, had better port facilities, and were closer to Sydney. However, local interests continued to advocate coal loading at Morpeth.

Regular shipping port operations at Morpeth ceased in 1931, but some shipping continued in a small way after that time. Due to wartime constraints on transporting coal by rail, in 1940, coal from Rothbury was shipped at Morpeth but not directly to Sydney; it was brought to the port by road and then sent by barge for transshipment at a downstream river port.

The river gradually silted up—no longer being dredged—leaving Morpeth to fall into further decline. The branch line closed in 1953.

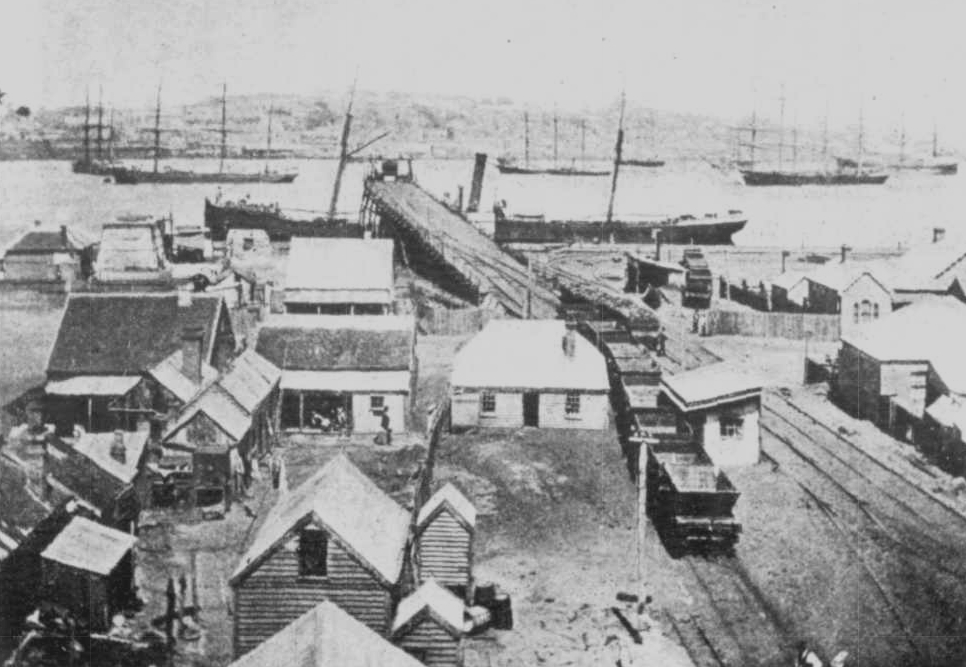
Coal wharf at Stockton c. 1900

===== Stockton =====
There was a colliery at Stockton, the Stockton Colliery. Coal, exclusively from that mine, was loaded on the Hunter River side of the Stockton peninsula, from 1885 to 1908. Coal was carried a short distance from the mine, in railway wagons, onto an elevated structure and dumped, via a staith, into the ship's hold. Later, two steam cranes were relocated from Queens Wharf at Newcastle. It was the only significant ship-loading operation on the left bank (northern side) of the Hunter River estuary.

===== Drop Ship =====
From October 1859 to late 1868, an unusual mechanised ship loading arrangement, known as a 'Drop Ship', was in use. It was operated first by the Tomago Colliery; the mine was inland from the left bank of the Hunter River, at Tomago, opposite Hexham. Around May 1860, this unique loading operation was taken over by the Minmi Colliery of J & A Brown, who then used it to load vessels too large to be able to use their staiths at Hexham.

The Drop Ship—made by equipping the hulk of an old 400 ton sailing ship, Antrocite—was permanently moored, in a deep part of the Hunter River channel, between Stockton and the Dyke wharf. Upstream, coal was carried by rail from the Tomago mine to the river bank of the north channel, in wagons of four tons capacity but subdivided into two sections of two tons each. The coal was then dumped into boxes, of two tons capacity each, inside a barge. Each barge contained multiple boxes, variously reported as 21 or 30 boxes per barge. A steam tugboat, Aquarius, then towed the barge downstream to the Drop Ship. With a barge alongside one side of the Drop Ship, a box was then lifted by a crank mechanism on the Drop Ship, which carried that box across to the other side of the Drop Ship and dumped its contents into the hold of the ship being loaded. The same crank mechanism then returned the empty box to the barge, before repeating the process for the next box. The crank mechanism was powered by a steam engine and was capable of loading 300 tons of coal per day. It was reported that, "The apparatus was contrived and put together by Captain Rountree, at Waterview Bay".

The Drop Ship was still operating in August 1868. It was removed to a dock, in January 1869, as it required an overhaul and repairs, but does not appear to have ever been used again. Its location is shown on a chart of the port from 1869.

===== Carrington – the Dyke, the Basin – and Port Waratah =====
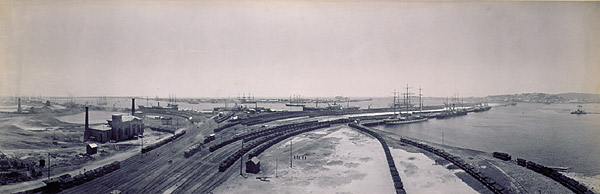
The Dyke, with the Basin on the right, the rail-yard in the foreground and the pump house to the left, 1904 (aerial photograph by Melvin Vaniman)

The port at Carrington was the largest of all the coal ports of the coastal coal-carrying trade. The Basin and the Dyke could handle larger ships and were also used for coal export and coal bunkering, as well as loading sixty-milers and interstate colliers.

The area was originally shoals fringing a low-lying island, Bullock Island, within the estuary of the Hunter River, and was submerged at high tide. Sailing ships using the old port of Newcastle tipped stone ballast in the area and, with other reclamation work, the line of The Dyke was created by 1861. The first wharf facilities on the Dyke were jetties used to unload ballast.

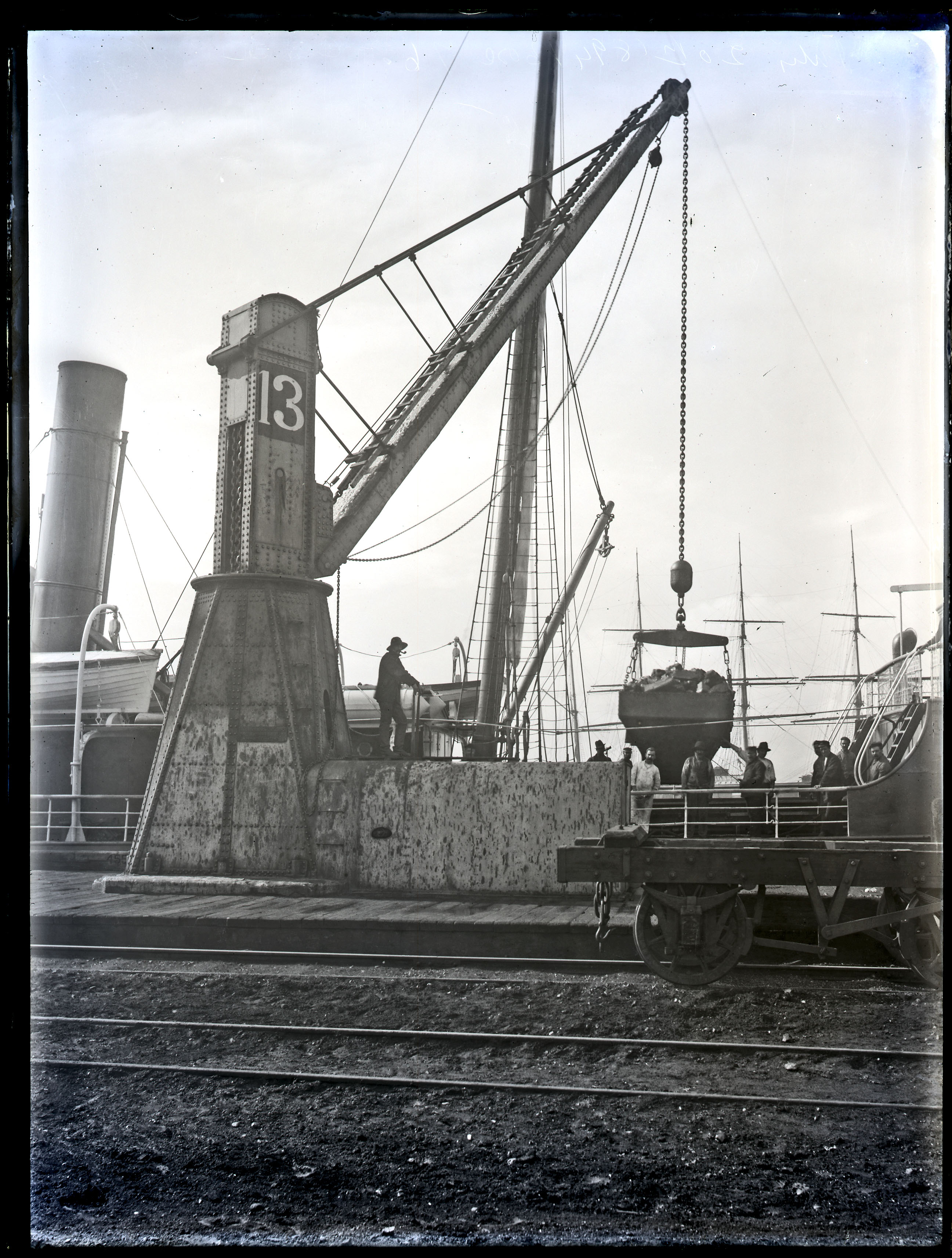
Hydraulic Crane No.13, The Dyke, in 1894. Photographer, Ralph Snowball

The Dyke had the effect of constraining the main channel of the Hunter River, so that the natural flow and tidal movement of the river tended to scour sediments from the river floor and maintain a shipping channel. Beginning in 1874, work began on the creation of a new coal port. Land was reclaimed behind the original Dyke, which became the large rail-yard for the port. Coal was loaded at The Dyke from 1878.

The Basin is an artificial harbour, to the west of the Dyke, which opens into the junction of Throsby Creek and the Hunter River. Originally a part of low-lying Bullock Island, it was created by dredging work, beginning around 1889 and being completed around 1893.

The first wharves on the Basin were those on the eastern side, opposite the wharves of the Dyke. At first, the Basin was used as mooring and as a location to unload ballast. By mid-1903, two—of eventually six—coal loading cranes were operating there, essentially as an extension to the loading operations of the Dyke. In 1913, work was underway on another line of wharves, on the western side of the Basin. Those new wharves were completed in 1915.

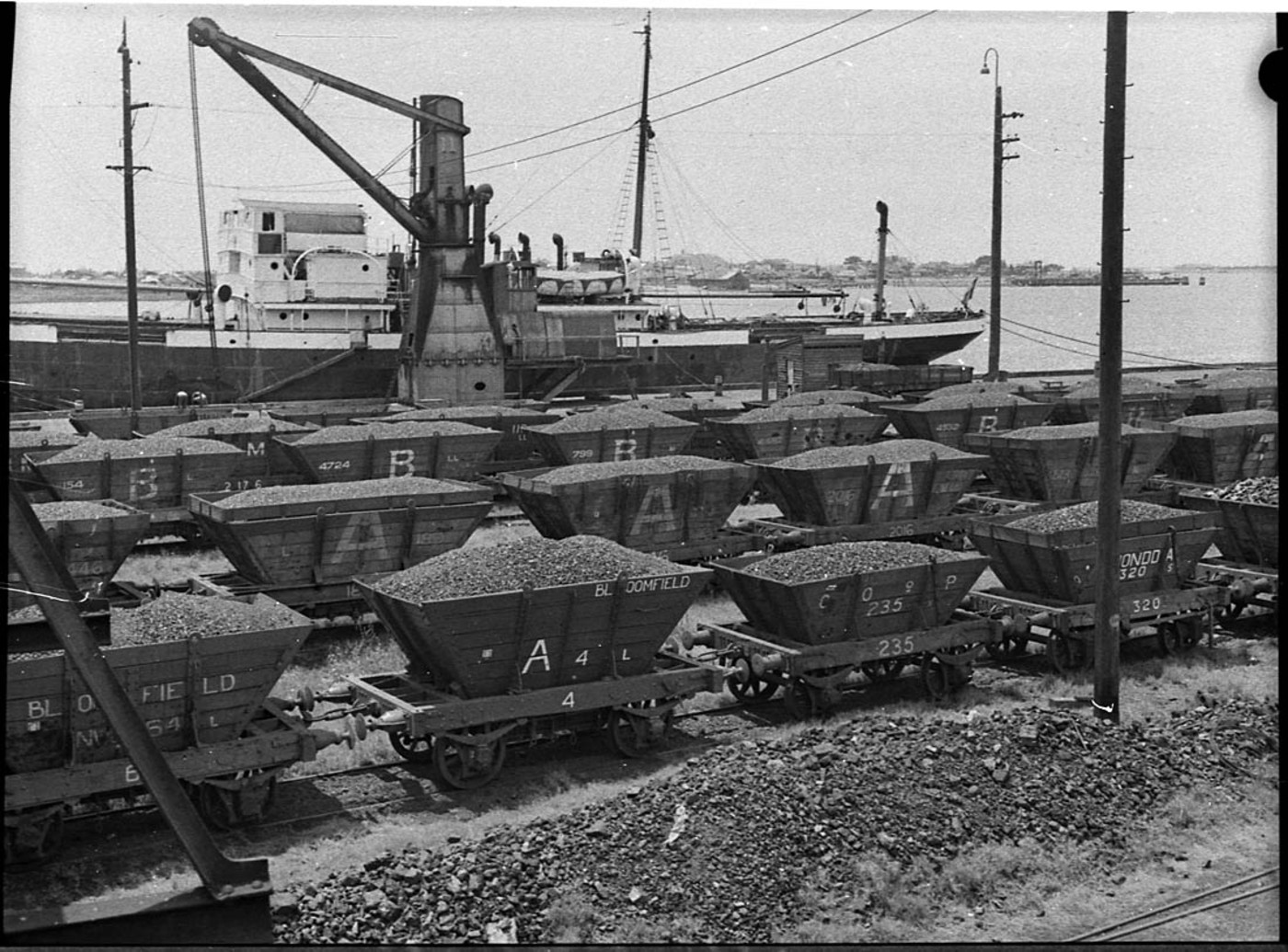
Hydraulic crane at the Dyke (1956), with "non-air" wagons, left full due to a wharf strike, in the foreground

The Carrington coal port used twelve hydraulic cranes powered by water under pressure supplied from a pumphouse nearby. There were also three steam cranes, which had been relocated from Queens Wharf. In 1890, this government-operated facility was capable of loading a total of 12,000 tons per day. The first electric cranes were commissioned at the Basin, in 1916, but at the end of that year needed to be shutdown for a short time, while the power supply was improved. By mid 1917, there were six electric cranes there. Electric lighting was introduced in the early 1890s, replacing the open coal fires that had previously illuminated nighttime coal loading operations. By 1902, the Dyke area was lit by 59 electric lights, each of 5,000 candlepower, reportedly allowing loading at night as easily as during daylight.

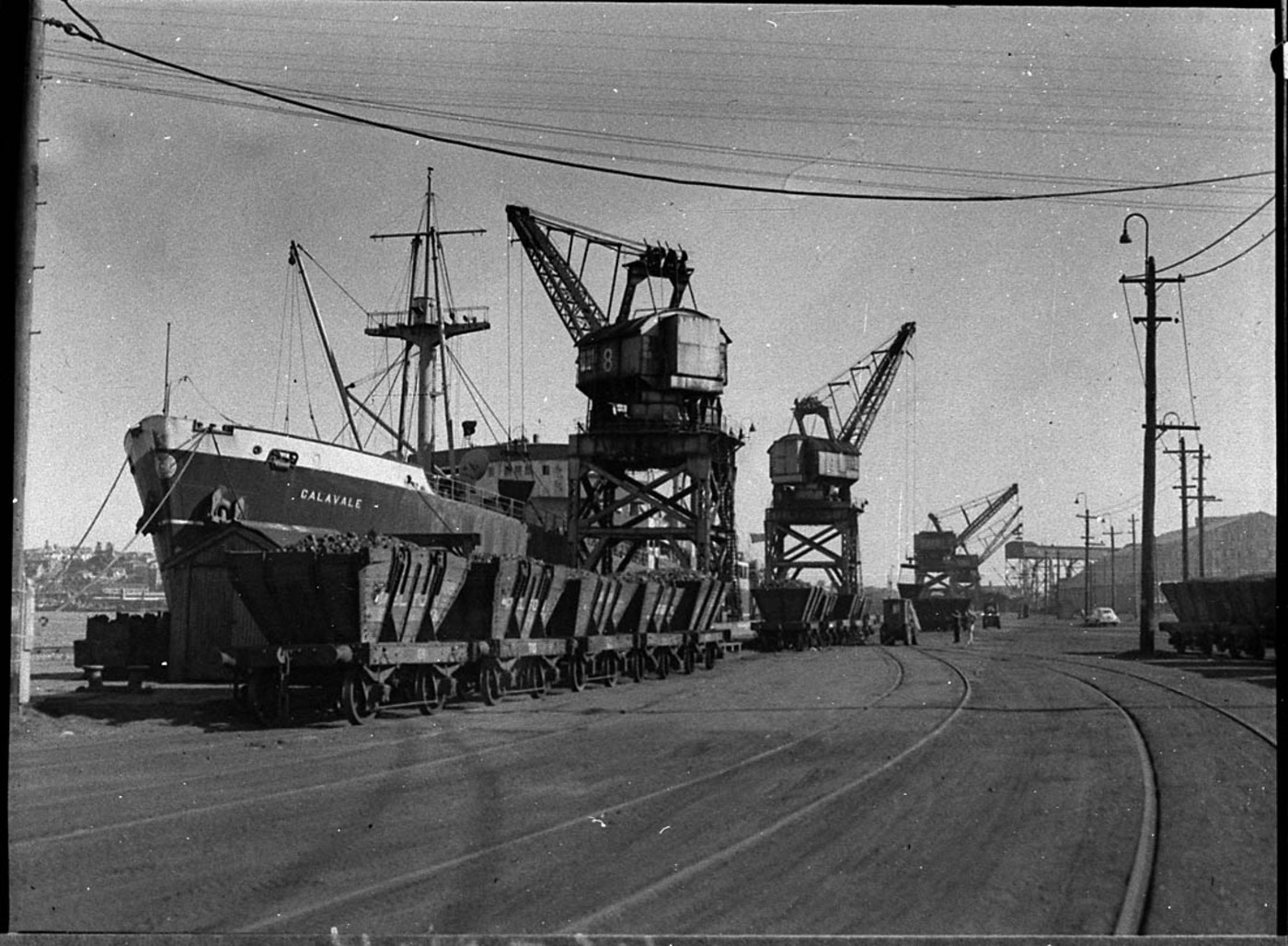
Electric coal-loading cranes at Carrington in December 1955

Further upstream from the Dyke, on the South Channel of the Hunter River, were some privately operated chutes capable of another 3,000 tons per day. These private operations dated back to those of the Waratah Coal Company, which opened its own 600 foot long wharf on Bullock Island, in March 1865. The wharf was connected first to the company's mine at Waratah and later to another of its mines at Charlestown. It was this venture, and the small township that sprang up near the wharf, which gave the northern part of the port area its name, Port Waratah. The port facility and railway line were bought by the Caledonian Coal Co., who used it until 1904, when the river had become too shallow due to silting.

In 1907, the government bought the Waratah Coal Co.'s railway lines—by then owned by Caledonian Coal Co—to Port Waratah. The aim was to alleviate the congestion of trains and wagons that was occurring at the busy wharves of The Dyke and The Basin, by rerouting the trains to those wharves via Port Waratah. instead of Wickham. More land was resumed by the government in 1913.

The availability of coal and river frontage for wharves led to Port Waratah becoming a site of heavy industry, first for copper smelting and later as the site of the large BHP Newcastle Steelworks.

===== Hexham =====
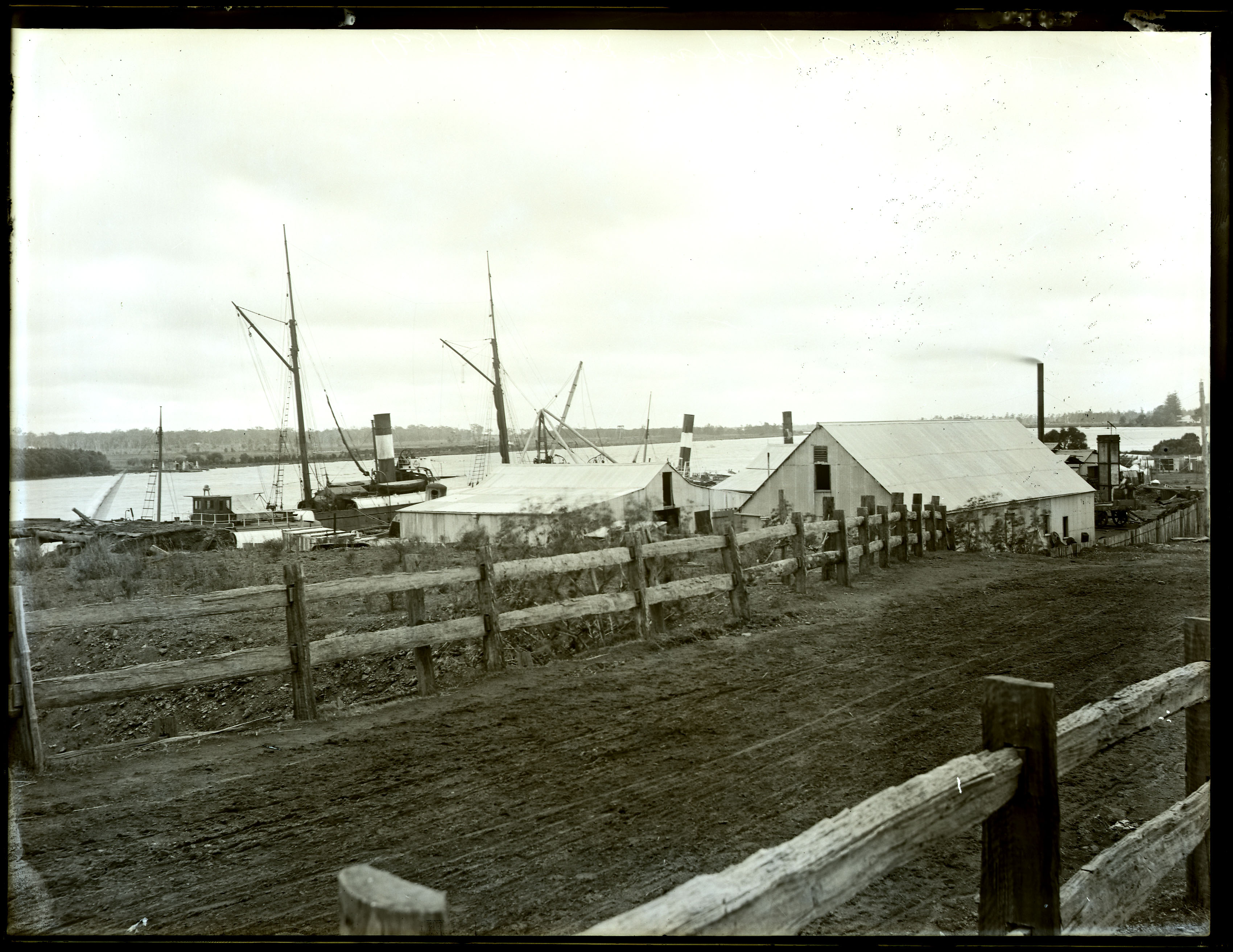
J. & A. Brown, Hexham, NSW, in 1897 (Photographer, Ralph Snowball)

Hexham is located on the Hunter River upstream from Newcastle. It is where the Hunter River separates into its north and south channels. It is the lowest point on the river where vessels leaving a port on the right bank can have access to the North Channel. Upstream of Hexham the river, although still tidal, becomes meandering and more difficult for vessels to navigate. As a river port, care had to be taken so ships made use of the tides to avoid running aground in shallow Fern Bay, when laden with coal and heading downstream, via the North Channel of the Hunter, to the sea.

There were three coal loaders at Hexham.

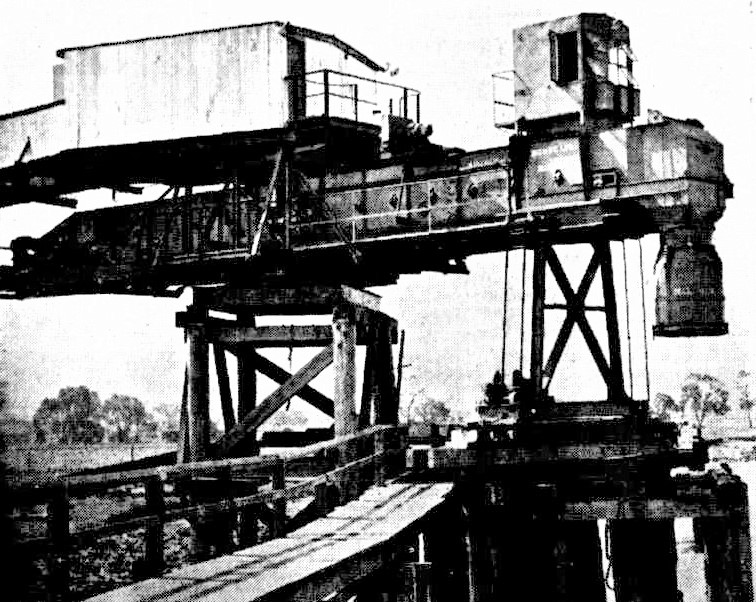
Hetton Bellbird Collieries Ltd. ship loader at Hexham. It was capable of loading at 500 tons/hour. (unknown photographer, Newcastle Morning Herald, 25 Jan 1936, p. 7)

The most downstream loader was J & A Brown's staithes that were supplied with coal by the Richmond Vale Railway, via a right-angle crossing (across the government-operated Main North railway line), from 1856 until November 1967.

The next loader upstream was the RW Miller coal loader, located next to the Hexham Bridge. It was built in 1959 and supplied only by road. After the merger of RW Miller with Coal & Allied in the mid-1980s, it was used by Coal & Allied to load coal washed at the Hexham Coal Washery and destined for Sydney. This loader was closed 1988 after the closure of the washery.

The most upstream loader was built in 1935 for the Hetton Bellbird Collieries and was sold to the Newcastle Wallsend Coal Company in 1956. It was supplied via the South Maitland Railway up to the East Greta Exchange Sidings (near Maitland) and from there via the Main North (government) railway to the Hetton Bellbird Sidings at the loader. The coal was dumped at a dump station and was transferred via conveyor across the main line and highway to a ship-loader. The loader was closed in 1972 and demolished during 1976.

==== Lake Macquarie ====
Lake Macquarie could handle only very small craft due to the shallow opening of the lake to the sea at Swansea. Only the very smallest of the 'sixty-milers'—ships like Novelty, Commonwealth, Himitangi, Euroka, and Doris—were suitable. A breakwater and dredging of the channel allowed these ships to pass the shallow entrance. However, movement of sand at the entrance, and the infrequent dredging, constrained the volume of coal that could be carried, even below the capacity of such small vessels. The shipping of coal from the lake was commercially marginal at best, and that, in turn, affected the viability of those mines that depended upon lake shipping.

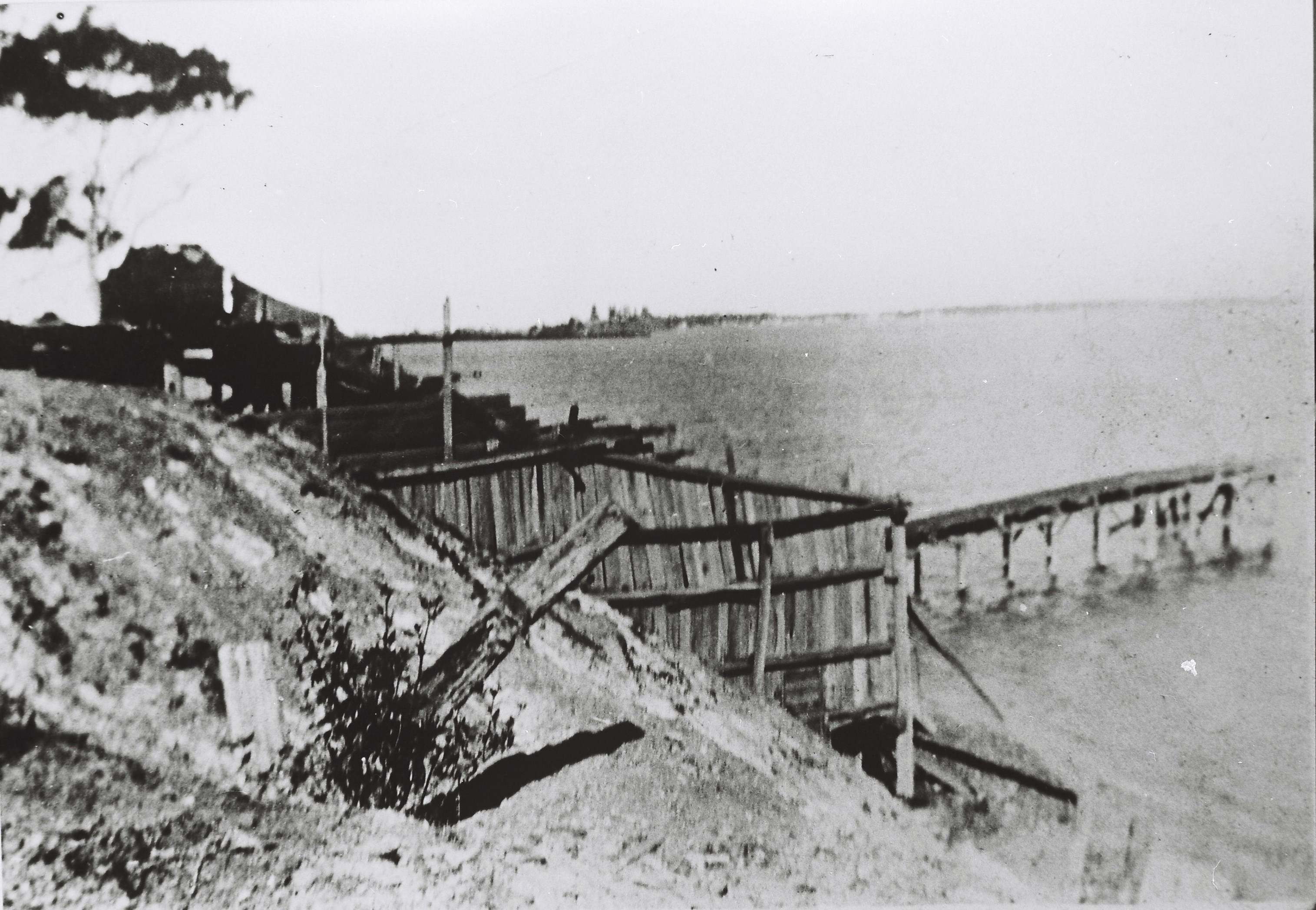
Storage bins and coal jetty, Green Point, on Lake Macquarie (Lake Mac Libraries)

The South Hetton Colliery shipped coal from a wharf at Coal Point on the western shore of Lake Macquarie. There had been a jetty at Coal Point used by the Ebenezer Colliery from the 1840s, from which coal was ferried across the lake to a wharf on the south side of Swansea Channel, near the Reid's Mistake Headland, that was used as a transshipment location for coal for Sydney in the 1840s. Coal was also loaded at Green Point on the eastern side of the lake. Belmont Colliery loaded coal at a jetty on the lake during the 1920s. Coal was bought to the jetty on two-ton trucks running on a tramway, and loaded aboard the small ships Wyalong and White Bay. There were other collieries near to the northern, eastern and western shores of the lake, but most of these were connected to railway lines and sent their coal to Carrington and some for local consumption at the Newcastle Steelworks. Cardiff Colliery to the north of the lake did ship coal via Lake Macquarie.

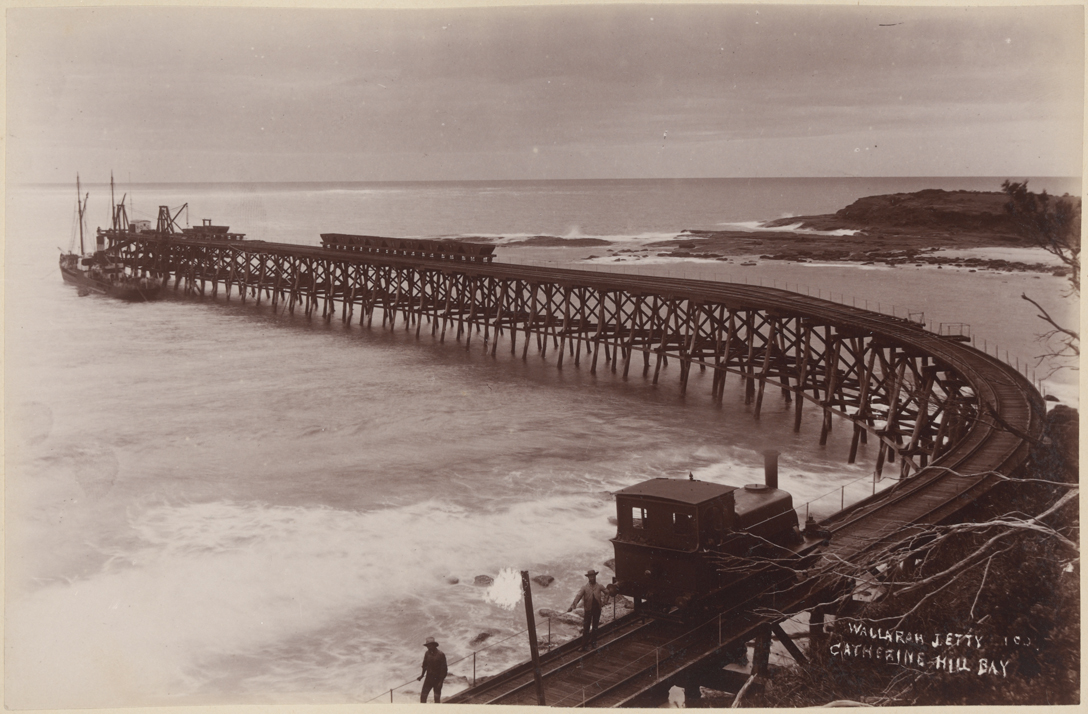
Catherine Hill Bay Jetty with a small sixty-miler alongside (NSW State Archives collection)

==== Catherine Hill Bay ====
Catherine Hill Bay was the only ocean jetty port on the northern coalfields. Coal from the Wallarah Colliery was loaded here for Sydney and Newcastle. By using an ocean jetty, this colliery could exploit the coal seams of Lake Macquarie, without ships needing to enter the Swansea Channel. The port could still be dangerous, under unfavourable weather conditions, and some ships came to grief there.

Over the life of the port, there were three jetties. The second jetty was destroyed by a storm, in 1974, and replaced with a jetty of concrete and steel construction.

It was the last port used by the coastal coal trade in 2002. Coal was last loaded for the short trip to Newcastle, where it was loaded for export. The last Wallarah Collliery operations, the Moonee Mine, nearby the jetty, closed in the same year.

==== Cabbage Tree Bay, Norah Head ====
Cabbage Tree Bay is sheltered on the south by Norah Head. There had been a wharf there from the 1830s, largely due to the activities of timber getters, cutting down red cedar trees near the Tuggerah Lakes. A new jetty and moorings were completed, around late 1902, for the purpose of landing materials for the construction of the Norah Head Lighthouse, which was completed in 1903.

A lease application for land for a coal mine and jetty there was made in 1901. By 1903, it was planned to open up coal seams there and extend the new jetty to be 700 feet long, with the expectation that coal would be mined and shipped from that minor port. However, it seems that Cabbage Tree Bay / Norah Head never developed as coal port.

=== Southern Coalfields — Illawarra Region ===
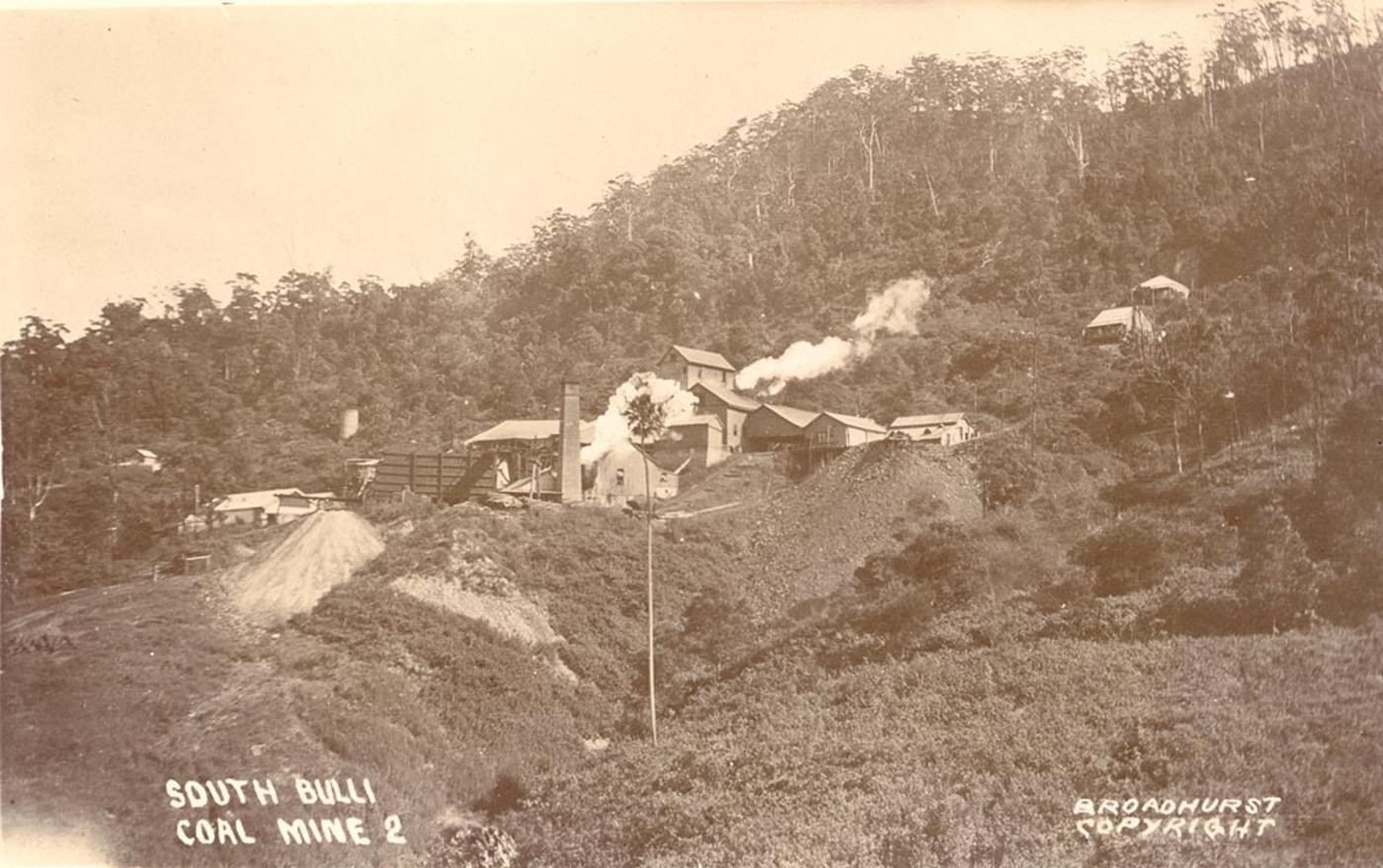
South Bulli Colliery, an adit mine of the Southern Coalfields. (Date unknown, within 1900–1927. Photographer: Broadhurst, William Henry, 1855–1927, from collection of the State Library of N.S.W.)

Although lying much closer to Sydney, the southern coalfields were not developed early, due to the absence of any natural port. Coal in the southern coalfields was generally more easily won than in the northern field. The coal outcropped in sea cliffs or part way up the Illawarra Escarpment and adit mining was feasible. Adits were less costly to construct and operate than the shafts and sloping drifts of the northern coalfields. The southern coalfields could be worked profitably, if the problem of shipping could be solved. The absence of a suitable port held back development of the southern mines, until around 1849 when the Mt Kiera mine opened.

Coal from the southern coal fields, at various times, was loaded at Wollongong Harbour and Port Kembla and at the ocean jetty ports: Bellambi; Coalcliff; Hicks Point at Austinmer; and Sandon Point, Bulli. Port Kembla was originally an ocean jetty port but two breakwaters were added later to provide shelter.

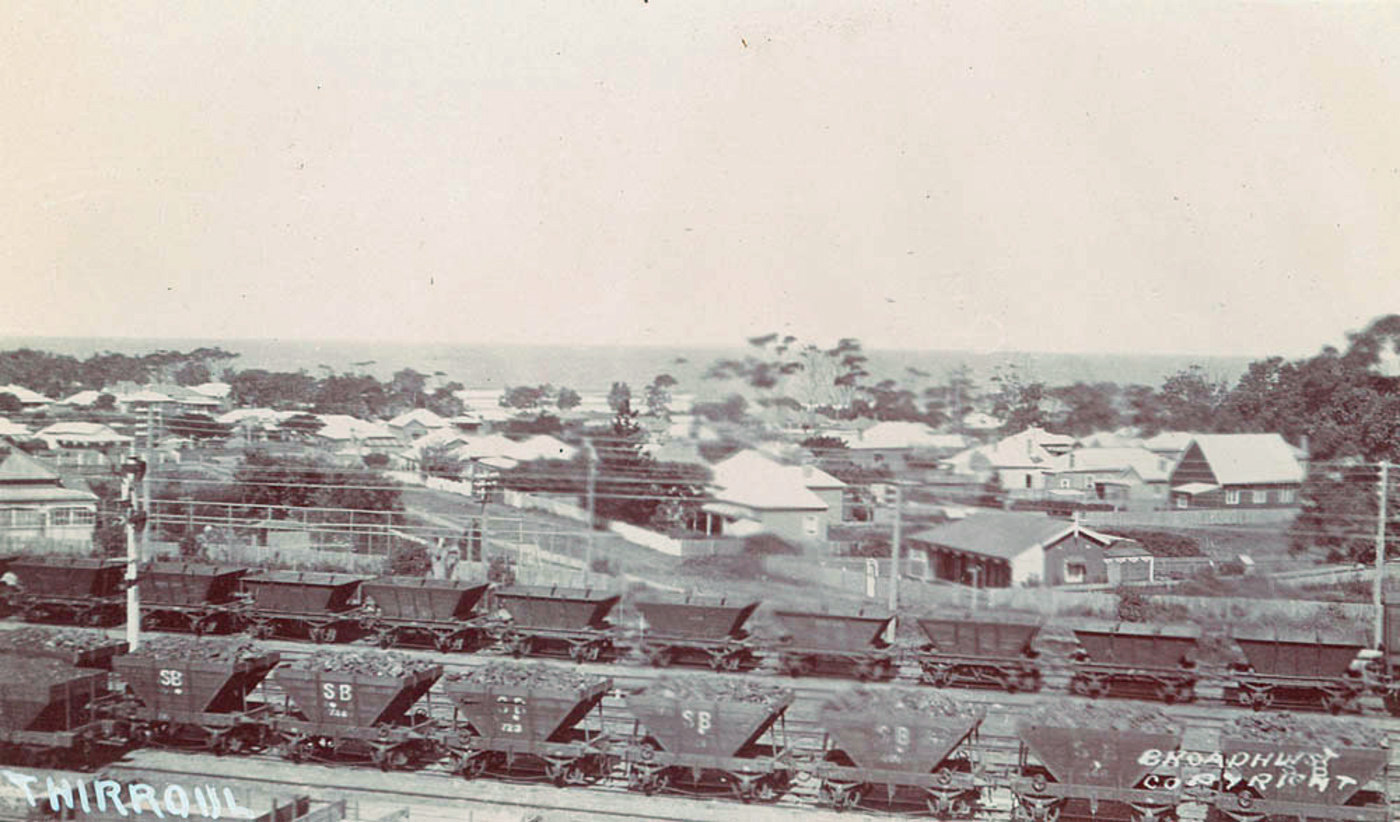
Coal trains consisting of four-wheel bottom-dump wagons at Thirroul. (Date unknown, within 1900–1927) The wagons in the foreground are owned by South Bulli Colliery. (photographer: Broadhurst, William Henry, 1855–1927, from collection of the State Library of N.S.W.)

Loading at the southern coalfield jetty ports typically used four-wheel wagons with hoppers fixed to the frames, which were tipped into chutes that led to high staithes from which the collier alongside the jetty or wharf was loaded. At Wollongong Harbour only, some loading was done by crane using wagons with removable hoppers, similar in concept to the ones used in the northern coalfields. After 1915, four-wheel bottom dump wagons were used to bring coal to the new No.1 Jetty at Port Kembla, via an unloading rail loop and dump station. This bottom-dumping operation was similar in concept to the coal-handling practice of today.

Unlike the northern fields, mines of the southern coalfield were usually named after a locality or geographical feature and their names rarely changed over their lifetime. The number of mines was also less and the mines tended to have longer lives.

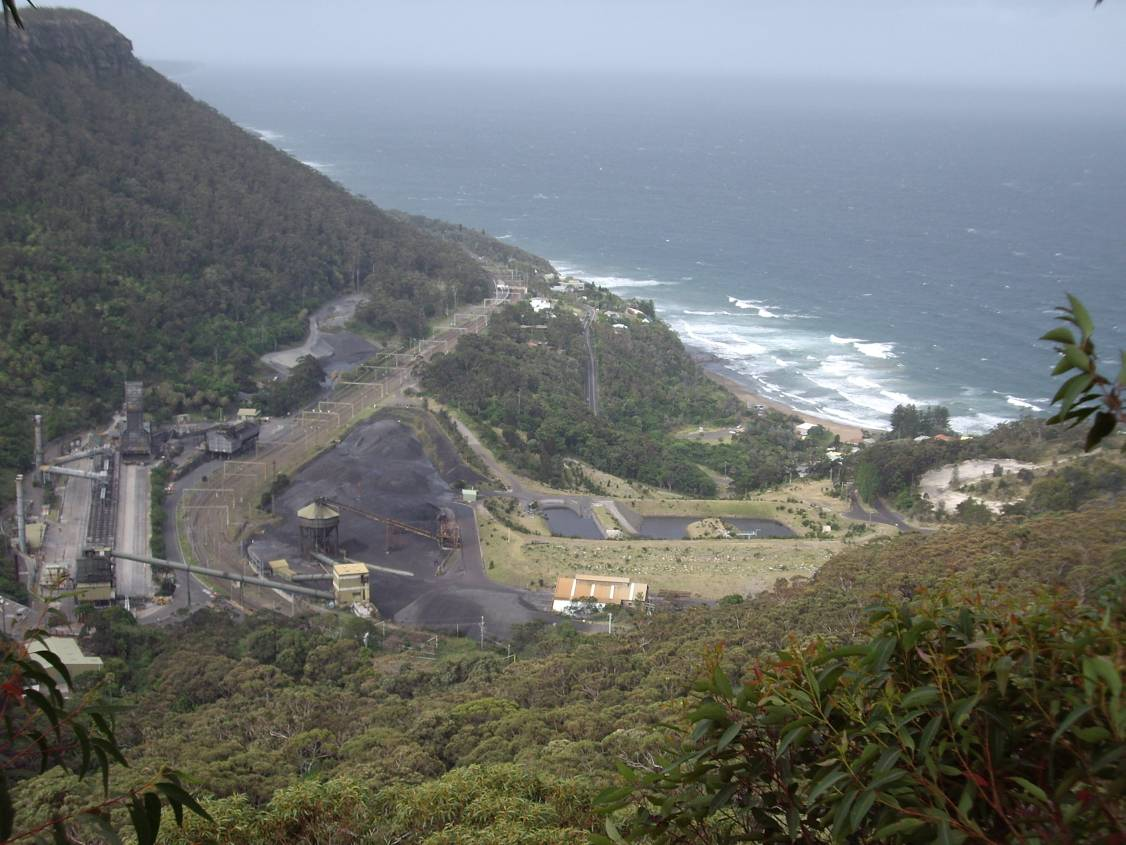
Illawarra Coke Company, Coalcliff (2006)

Most of the southern coalfield mines were members of the Southern Coal Owners' Agency, which had as one of its aims "prevention of ruinous competition". It was a cartel-like organisation, controlling production volume, prices, and transport costs, but only for the southern coalfields. It lasted from 1893 to 1950, being renewed every few years by agreement. Although the collieries that were members owned sixty-miler ships, those ships were chartered by the Agency. The Agency managed the operations of the ships and paid the owner a monthly fee based on each ship's capacity. Although the operation of the ships may not have been profitable, the collieries seem to have seen controlling the shipping of their coal as important to ensure reliable delivery, and as a necessary cost. Collieries received an initial low payment upon delivery of their coal to a customer but also later received a share of the actual profits from all sales, in proportion to their market share.

After the construction of the Illawarra railway line, some mines using shafts appeared at the northern end of the field. Shafts were used so that the mine could be sited close to the railway line, for ease of loading. Examples were the South Clifton Colliery and the later (1910) arrangement of the Coalcliff Colliery.

Over time, it would emerge that coal from the southern field is superior for making metallurgical coke, when compared to the coal from the northern field. Southern coal came to dominate coke production—some southern mines were taken over by the steel producer, Australia Iron and Steel, and other mines had their own cokeworks—whereas northern coal came to dominate the market for town gas production. Both northern and southern coals were used as bunker coal for steamships.

==== Wollongong Harbour ====
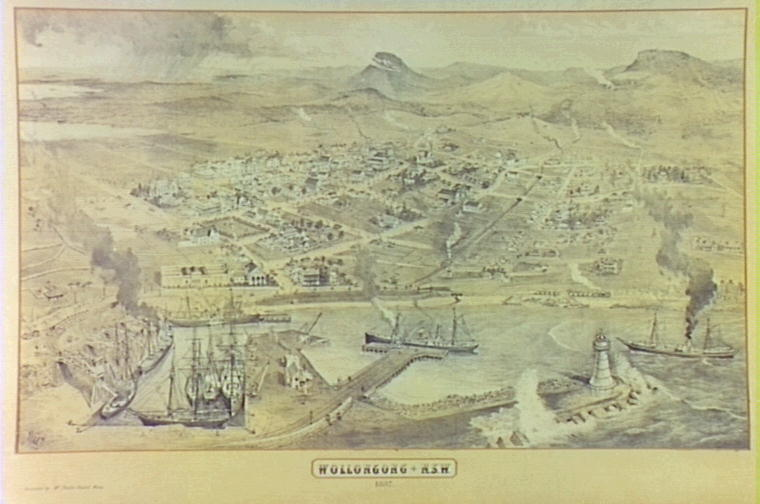
Wollongong Harbour in 1887. (From an engraving later published in Illustrated Sydney News, 15 October 1887, on pages 1 and 2) Belmore Basin is in the left foreground - with its coal staithes on the far-left - and the "Tee-wharf" is in the centre. Mt Kembla is in the centre-background with Mt Kiera on the right. The rail ine from Mt Kiera can be seen running from that mountain and that from Mt Pleasant running along the beach. Red Point - near the site of Port Kembla - is in the distance at the very top left.

Wollongong was for a time the only safe anchorage on the southern coalfields and the third largest port in New South Wales.

The coal port at Wollongong Harbour consisted of the man-made Belmore Basin and the "Tee Wharf". On Belmore Basin, there were four coal staithes on the western side of the basin and two steam cranes on the eastern side. Loading at the "Tee Wharf" was by a single steam crane. The "Tee-Wharf" was exposed to weather from the north and north-east; the existing northern breakwater was not built until 1966–67.

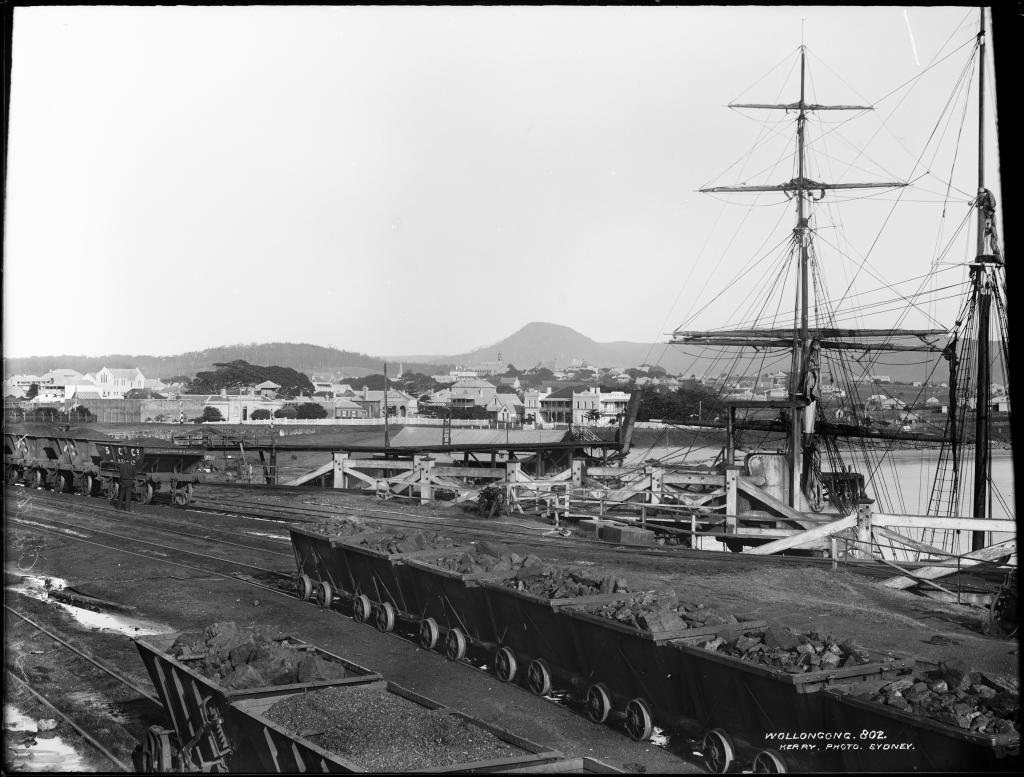
Coal staiths at Belmore Basin. Note the two different rail gauges in use.

The port was connected to the Mount Kiera and Mount Pleasant Collieries by rail lines operated by the respective collieries. Originally these were horse-drawn but later used steam locomotives. Both lines opened using an unusual narrow gauge of 3 foot 8½ inch. The Mount Kiera line was converted to standard gauge in 1878. From then on, two staiths had standard gauge tracks and the other two had narrow gauge tracks. The tracks to the "Tee Wharf" were dual-gauge.

From 1875 to 1890, there was a cokeworks, which converted unsaleable fines to coke, some of which was loaded at the port for Sydney.

The Tee Wharf and its steam crane were occasionally used for loading coal, probably more commonly during replenishing of coal bunkers.

Belmore Basin constrained the size and depth of vessels that could be loaded there, but it was better sheltered than ocean jetty ports. It was used by sixty-milers, including small wooden vessels, such as Dunmore, and relatively small sailing vessels, such as Amy.

By 1927, there was only one coal staith in operation at Wollongong. The last coal was loaded there in 1933, by which time it had been eclipsed as a coal port by Port Kembla.

==== Port Kembla ====
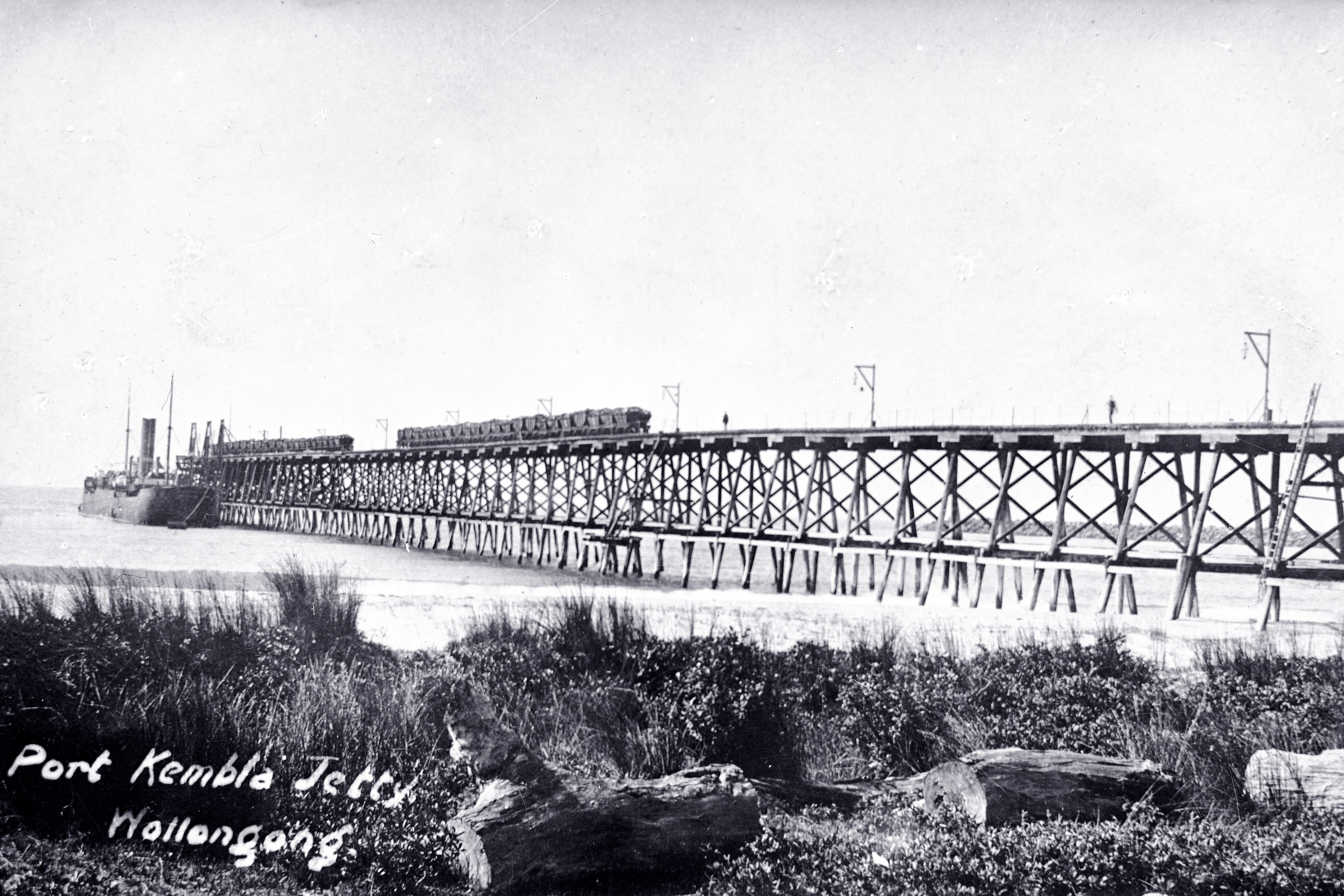
Mount Kembla Jetty at Port Kembla (1883). ARHS Collection.

From 1883, coal was shipped from an ocean jetty on the beach just to the north of a rocky headland lying to the north of Red Point and Boiler's Point. This new port was named Port Kembla, after the Mount Kembla mine from where the coal was transported by rail. The new jetty, and the railway line to it from Mount Kembla, were crucial to exploiting the coal resource at Mount Kembla, which previously had been the site of shale oil extraction.

A second jetty belonged to the Southern Coal Company and was opened in 1887. It loaded coal sent by rail from the company's mine on the south face of Mount Kembla, behind Unanderra, and from another mine that it purchased, the Corrimal Colliery.

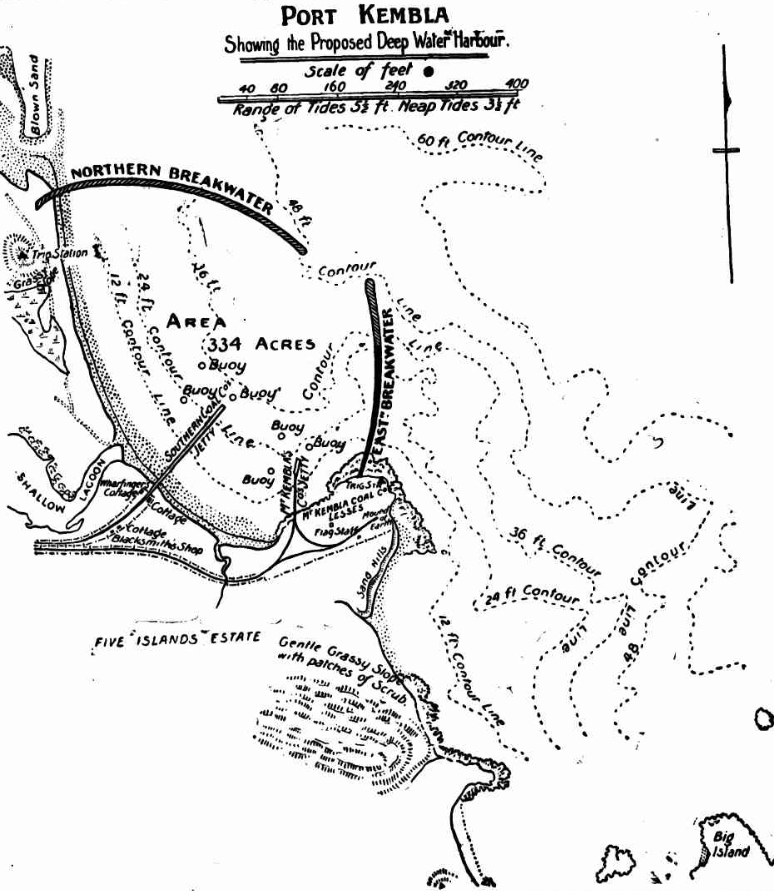
The port proposal (1908)

In its earlier years—much like the other ocean jetty coal ports—Port Kembla was exposed to rough seas during bad weather, Between 1901 and 1937, first an eastern breakwater and then a northern breakwater was constructed, resulting in a large protected and safe anchorage now known as the "Outer Harbour".

A new government-owned coal jetty was built to the north of the two existing coal jetties. The new coal jetty opened in 1915 and became No.1 Jetty, the Southern Coal jetty became No.2 Jetty, and the Mt Kembla Jetty became No.3 Jetty.

By 1937, the No.1 Jetty was loading coal from all the southern mines that shipped coal by sea, except those mines still using Bellambi or Bulli. After 1952, Port Kembla was the only coal port on the southern coalfields.

The No.1 Jetty remained in service until it was replaced in 1963, by a new export coal loader located on the new "Inner Harbour". Port Kembla remains a major coal export port.

==== Port Bellambi ====
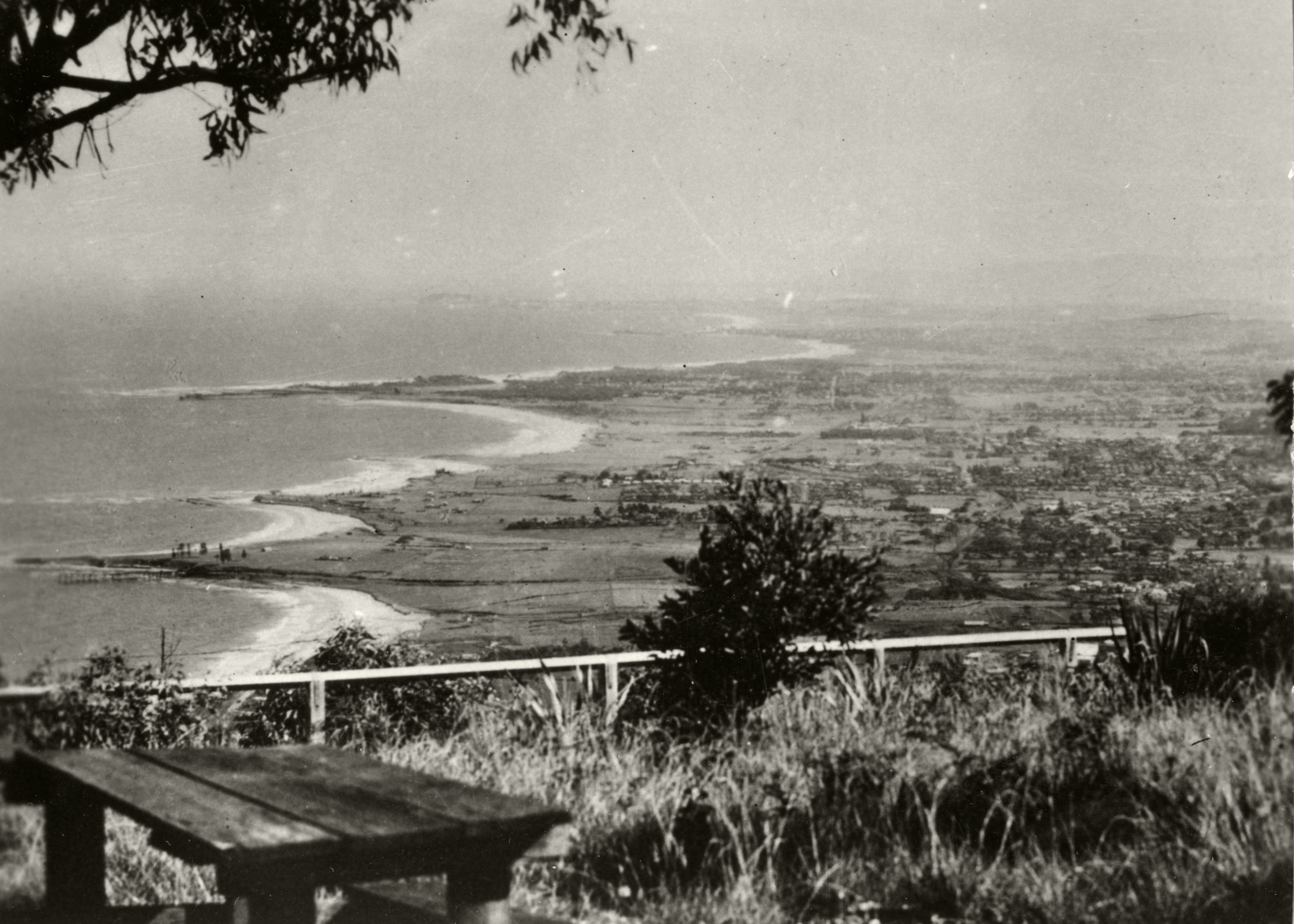
View towards Bellambi from Sublime Point Lookout (date unknown). Sandon Point, Bulli is the first headland, in the lower half of the photograph, with Bulli Jetty just visible. The long headland in the upper half of the photograph is Bellambi and its dangerous reef. The South Bulli jetty is there but is indistinct.

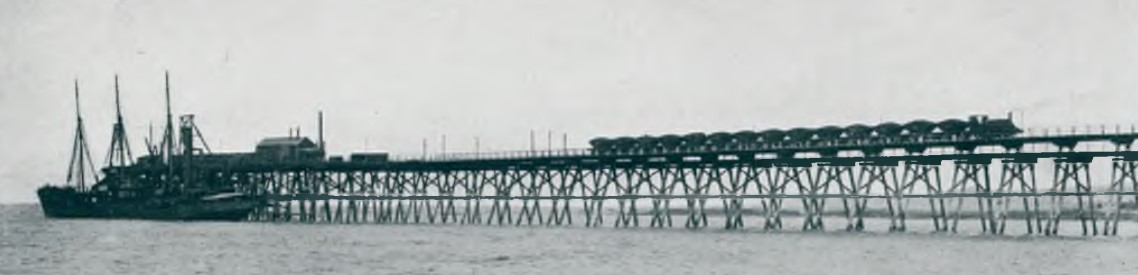
South Bulli Jetty, Port Bellambi c1909.

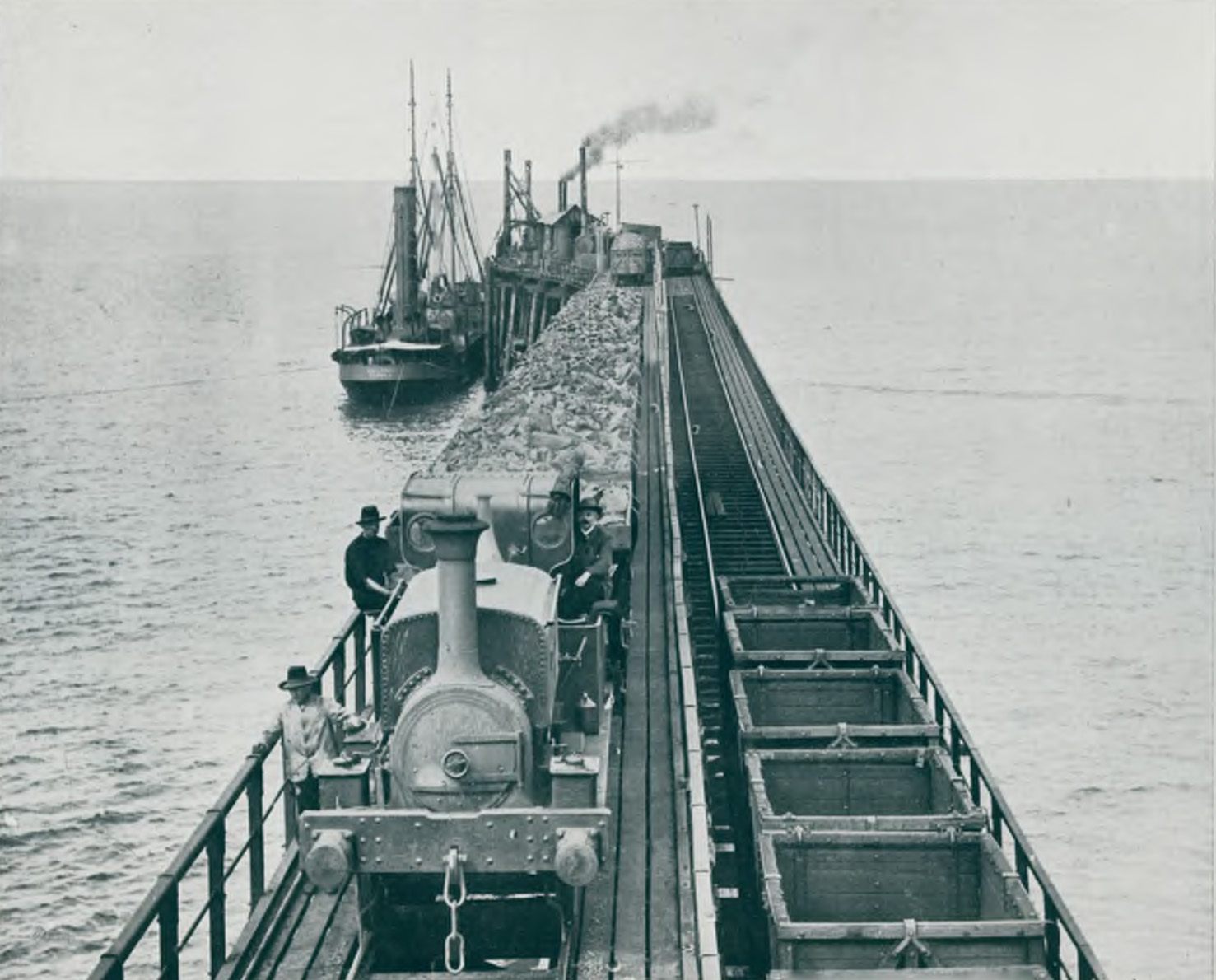
South Bulli Jetty, during the loading of a sixty miler, with locomotive and coal wagons. The railway track on the right is the track for returning empty wagons.

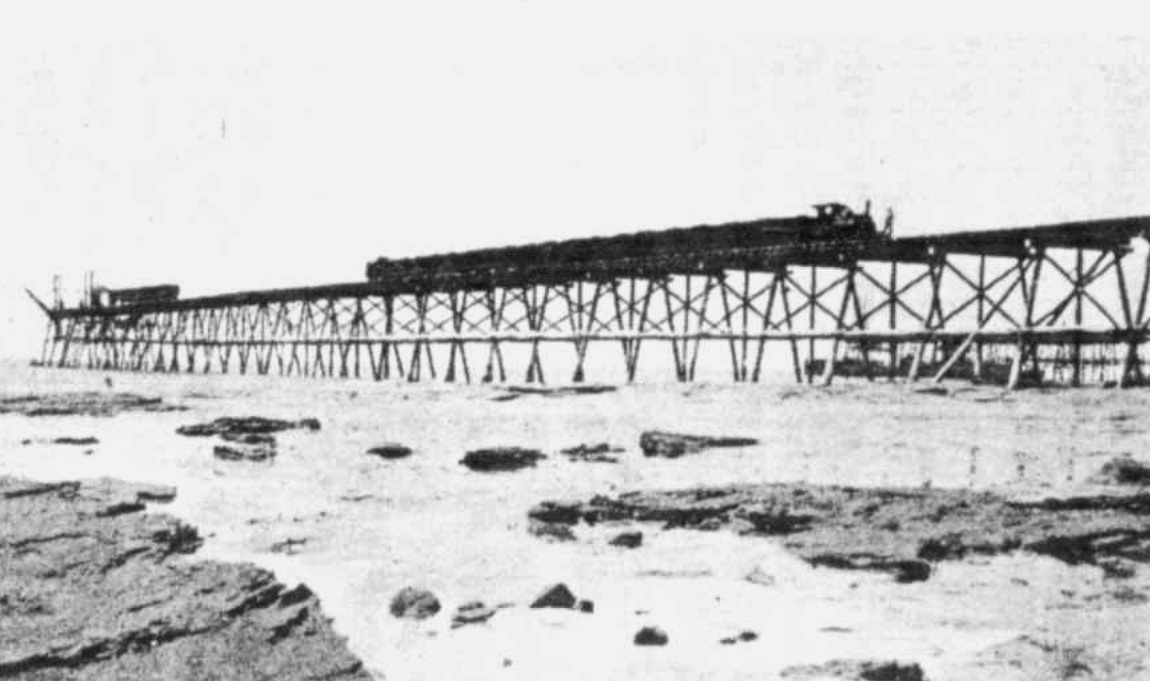
Bellambi Coal Co. Jetty before the storm damage of February 1898, with the South Bulli Jetty behind it.

There were originally two jetties at Bellambi, the South Bulli Jetty named after the mine of the same name and the Bellambi Coal Co. Jetty used by the Model Mine at Woonoona. The South Bulli Jetty built in 1887 was on Bellambi Beach immediately to the north of Bellambi Point. The Bellambi Coal Co. Jetty (also known as the "Woonoona Jetty") built in 1889 was located on a small rocky outcrop just to the north of the South Bulli Jetty, near where the Bellambi Rockpool is today. The port had also been the site of an earlier coal jetty completed around 1858 but only used for a relatively short time.

In late 1894, there was some agitation for construction of a breakwater to make safe harbour at Bellambi—a scheme known as 'Bellambi Harbour'— to protect its two coal jetties, but that never happened.

The Bellambi Coal Co. Jetty was damaged in a storm in 1898 and thereafter all coal went across the South Bulli Jetty.

Coal was sent from the mines by rail to the jetty, where there were two rail tracks on the jetty—one for full wagons and the other for empty wagons—and two loading chutes (one for each hold of a sixty-miler).

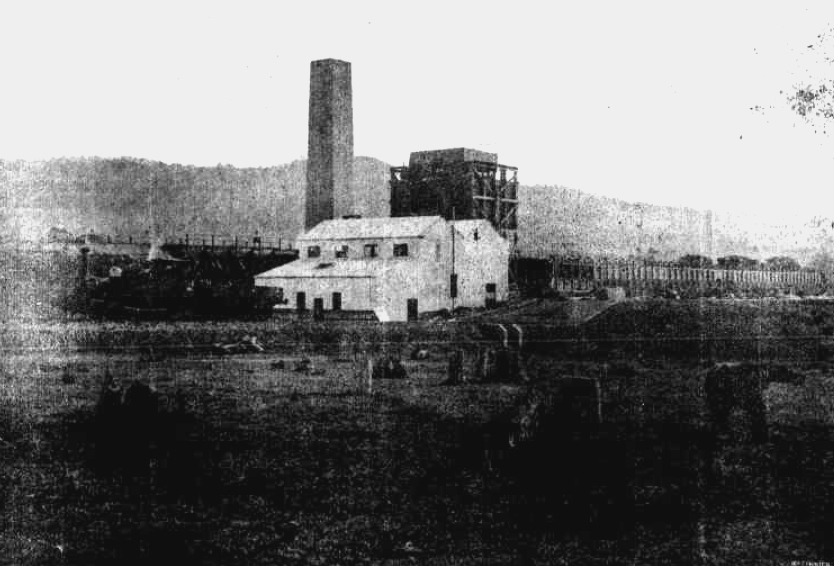
BHP Cokeworks at Bellambi (1903)

The wagons were separated for tipping. One end of the coal wagon was raised by a steam ram, acting on a wagon axle, tipping the coal through a hinged panel in the other end. Originally, the tipping of wagons seems to have been by gravity, with tilting section of track and a derrick arrangement used to raise the tipped wagon back to the level track position. The coal then passed through a chute, directly into one hold of the ship moored alongside the jetty. In 1909, six colliers were loaded with a total of 4,500 tons in 14-hours.

The jetty was also used, from 1901, for the loading of coke, destined for the South Australian port of Port Pyrie. The coke was made, using fine coal from the South Bulli Colliery, by the Bellambi cokeworks. It was established by BHP, in 1901, to provide coke for its smelters at Broken Hill, and from 1905 its new smelters at Port Pyrie. From 1915, the cokeworks at Bellambi and the smelters at Port Pyrie were owned by Broken Hill Associated Smelters. The cokeworks closed in July 1932; it was dismantled, with the equipment going to Mt Isa.

Bellambi was a particularly dangerous port. Bellambi Point protected the jetties from the south but its reef extends 600m to seaward and was a hazard to shipping. In total, twelve ships were wrecked at Bellambi between 1859 and 1949, of which seven ran aground on the reef.

The South Bulli Jetty operated until 1952. The jetty partially collapsed in 1955 and was demolished in 1970.

==== Coalcliff ====
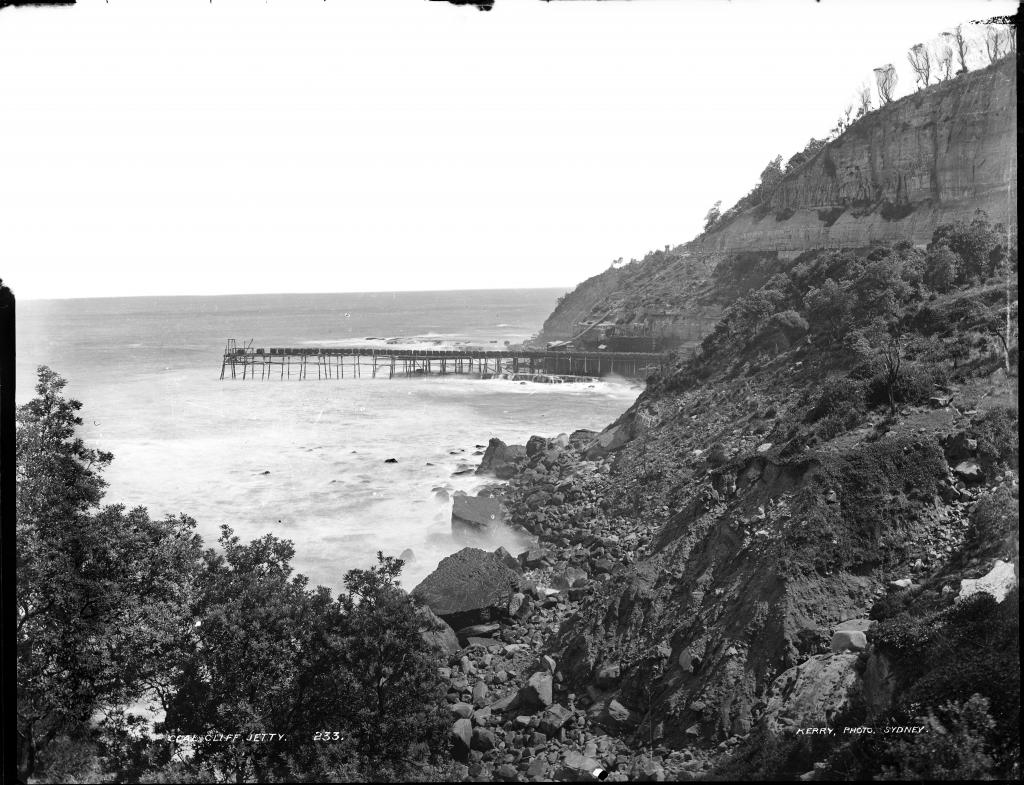
Coalcliff Jetty 1885 (Tyrrell Photographic Collection, Powerhouse Museum)

The Coalcliff Colliery, opened in 1878, was originally developed as a jetty mine. Coal from the mine, after screening, was brought directly onto the jetty. This arrangement made working the mine difficult, as there was limited storage for mined coal and only coal that could be shipped promptly could be mined.

The jetty at Coalcliff was the smallest of the southern ocean jetties. It was very exposed to ocean swell, and shifting sand shoals added to the danger by changing the depth of water near the jetty. The jetty was used only by the colliery's own sixty-milers and then only in favourable weather. Even in weather described as moderate, it was unsafe to load at the jetty.

Storms in 1878, 1881 and 1904 caused considerable damage to the jetty, further restricting shipping operations while damage was repaired and the jetty design modified.

As early as 1888, consideration was being given to opening a shaft mine on the western side of the new railway line. In 1910, a shaft was opened that allowed coal from the mine to be transported by rail and the jetty closed by 1912.

Although no longer operating its own jetty, Coalcliff Collieries continued to own and operate its sixty-milers, such as the Undola. This may have been so that the jetty mine's quota under the Southern Coal Owners' Agency agreement would still be allocated to the company, in addition to its new quota for the newer shaft mine.

==== Hicks Point, Austinmer ====
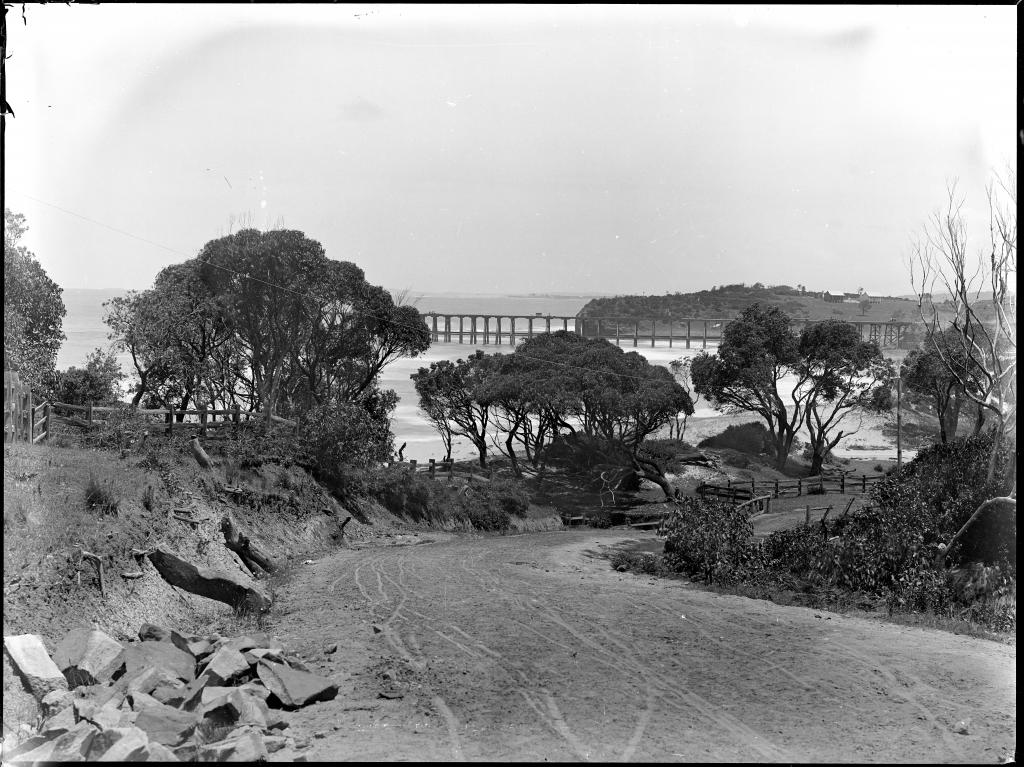
Hicks Point Jetty viewed from the north. The headland in the background is Brickyard Point, then known as Hicks Point.

Hicks Point is an old name for what is now known as Brickyard Point, Austinmer. The Hicks family were early settlers of the area. The site of the landward end of the jetty was on a small rock platform, on the beach in Hicks Bay. It was just to the north of Brickyard Point and its broad rock platform, which provided some shelter from southerly weather; today the area is used to launch boats.

The Hicks Point jetty was built in 1886 for the North Bulli Coal Company's colliery at Coledale to which it was connected by rail. It was also connected by rail to the Austinmer Colliery. Part way along the line to Austinmer Colliery, a short line provided a connection to the South Coast railway.

Coal was railed from the mine to the jetty in wagons with bottom opening doors, which were opened over a hatchway cut in the jetty deck. The coal flowed onto loading chutes and from there into the hold of the ship.

The jetty was damaged by storms in November 1903. The North Bulli Co. won the right to ship its coal via Port Kembla in 1906. The Hicks Point Jetty was no longer needed and fell into disuse. It was destroyed by fire in 1915.

==== Sandon Point, Bulli ====
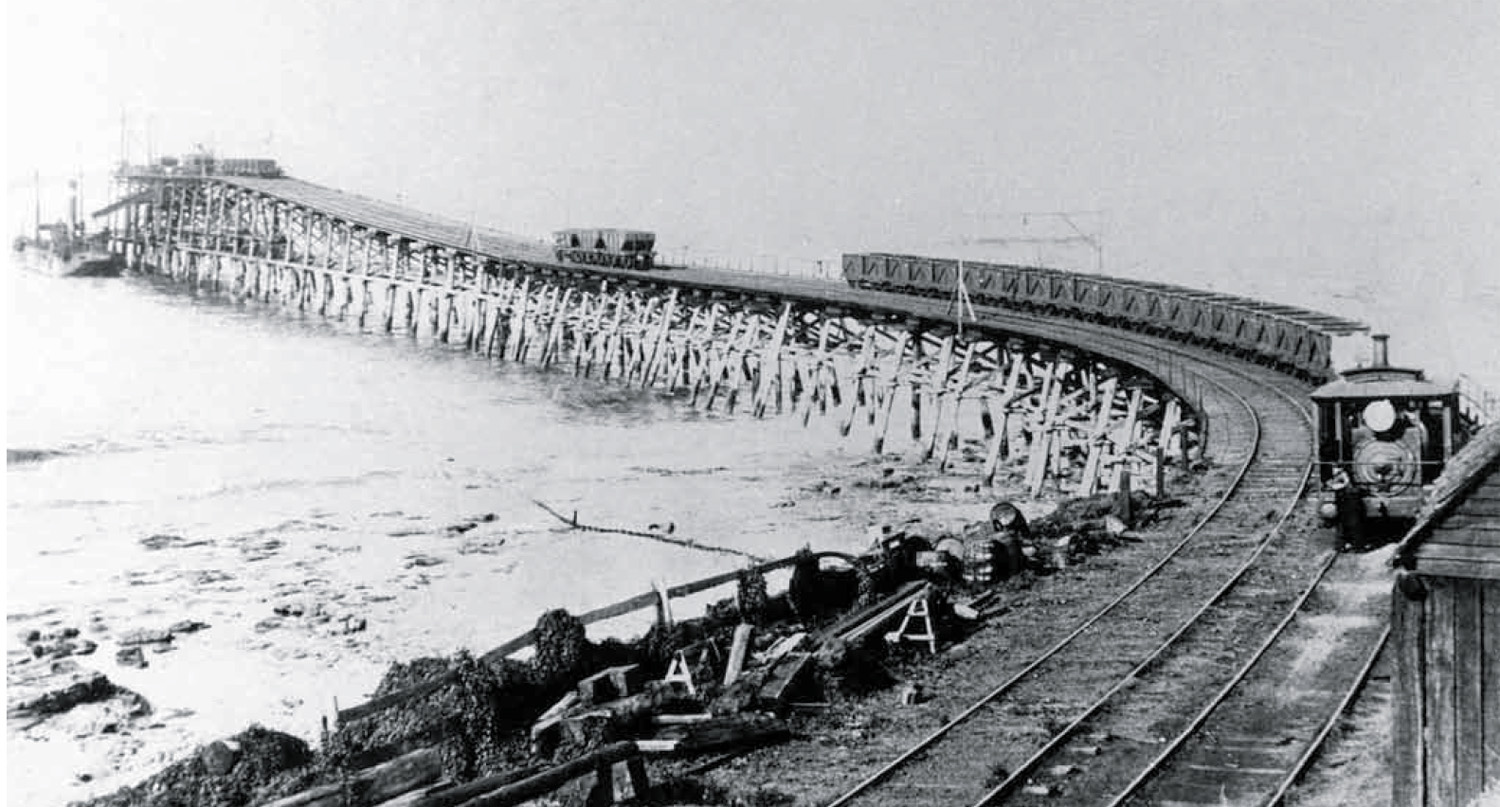
Bulli Jetty circa 1900. The unusual steam locomotive is a former steam tram motor.

The Bulli Jetty at Sandon Point was opened in 1863 and used to load coal obtained from the nearby Bulli Colliery.

The Bulli Colliery was bought by BHP in 1937 and thereafter much of its coal went to the Port Kembla steelworks by rail.

The Bulli Jetty was last used by ships in 1943. After closing, it was damaged by storms in 1943, in 1945 and in 1949, when the centre section of the remaining structure collapsed and stranded four fishermen at the sea-end. Some of the structure was still standing in the mid-1960s but was gone by the end of the decade.

==== Planned port on Lake Illawarra ====
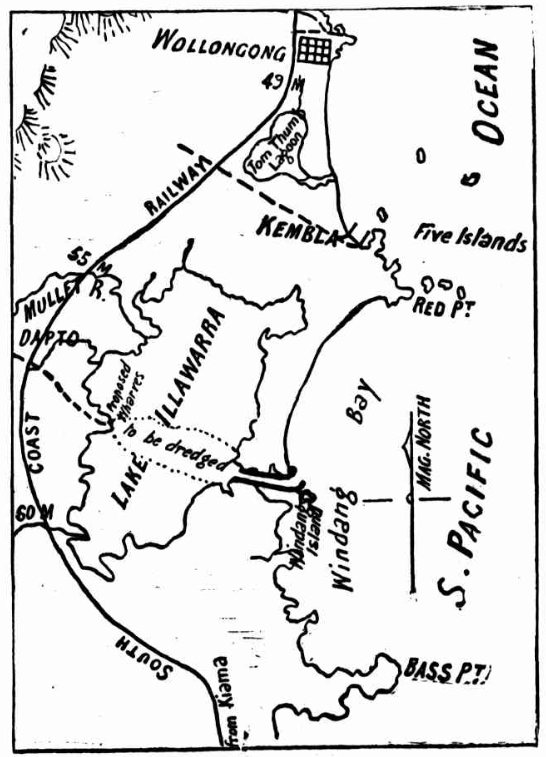
Map of planned port (1895).

A coal port on Lake Illawarra was to have been developed by a company known as Illawarra Harbour and Land Corporation. Enabling legislation was passed in 1890, and land was purchased on the western foreshore of the lake. Some limited work was done on a breakwater at the entrance of the lake at Windang.

in 1893, Australia entered a serious economic depression, which involved a banking crisis. By 1895, it appeared that the port scheme had stalled. However, in that year, a select committee was told that, while the original purpose had been a port for coal, there was now a plan to erect a smelter for sulphide ores. An advantage of the smelter to the port scheme would be that ships could arrive ballasted with ore, for smelting, and depart carrying cargoes of coal.

A railway was constructed from the planned site of the 'Ocean View' Colliery to near Elizabeth Point, just to the north of Tallawarra Point, where it was intended to develop the port and a township. The railway crossed, but was also connected to, the South Coast railway, a little south of Dapto railway station, around where Fowlers Road crosses the railway line now. It opened in December 1895, but was only used by Dapto Smelting Works.

The dredged channel across Lake Illawarra and the wharves at Elizabeth Point were never constructed, no coal was ever shipped, and the mine and jetty scheme was abandoned in 1902. Construction of the breakwater at Port Kembla had begun in 1901.

== Sydney ==
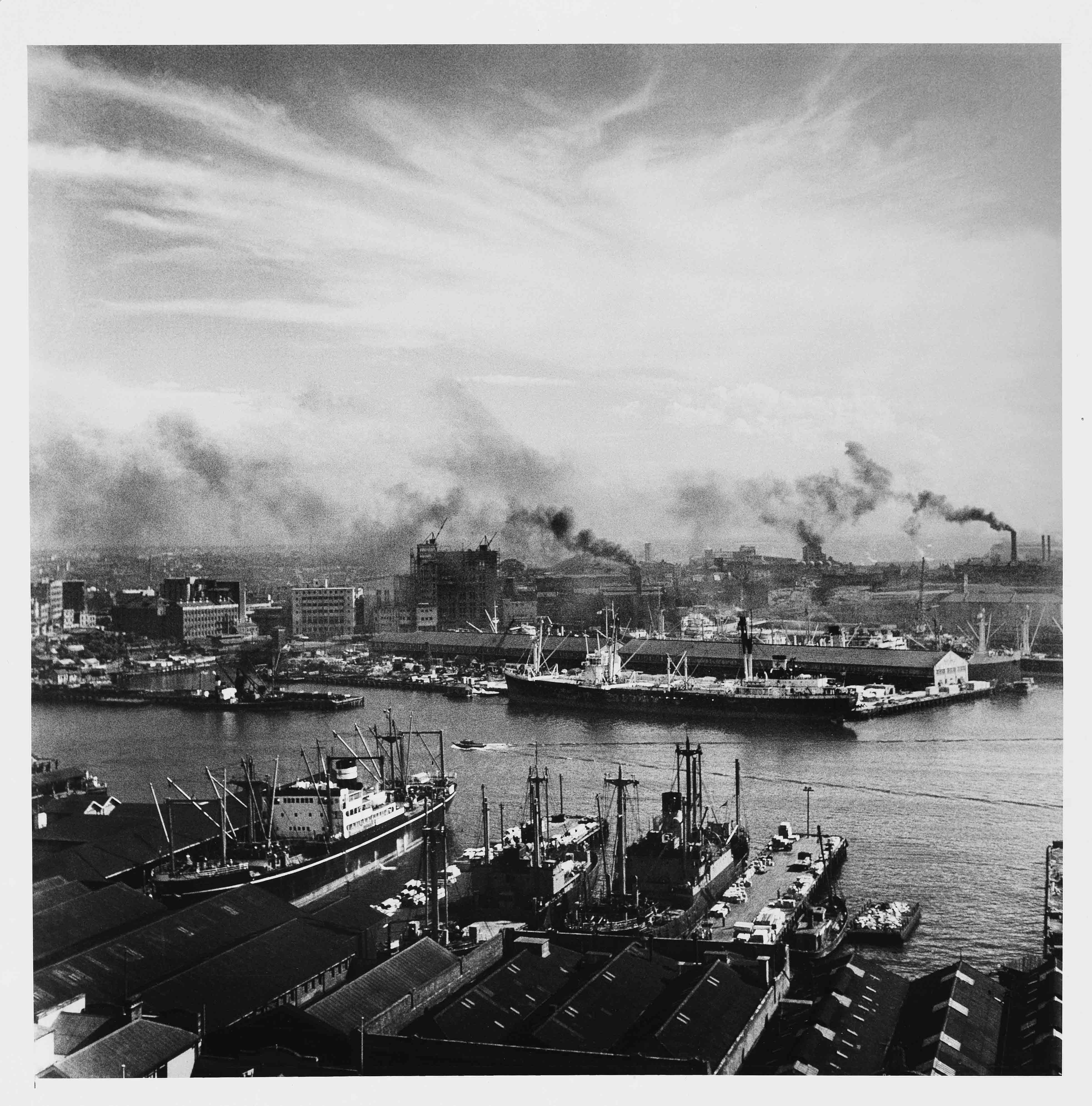
Darling Harbour wharves (front) and Pyrmont wharves (rear), David Moore, (1947)

Sydney was for many years heavily dependent upon a constant supply of coal for its electricity, town gas, transport and other uses, something made more apparent by the effects of industrial trouble in the coal industry in 1948-49.

Within Sydney Harbour and the Parramatta River, unloading facilities included the Ball's Head Coal Loader at Waverton, AGL gasworks at Millers Point (until 1921) and Mortlake, North Shore Gas Company gasworks at Neutral Bay (until 1937) and Waverton; the Manly Gasworks at Little Manly Point (Spring Cove), and the three coal unloading wharves, with their storage bunkers, at Blackwattle Bay. There were coal wharves at Pyrmont on Darling Harbour, where coal was sometimes unloaded but, more commonly, was loaded. Some large industrial customers had their own wharves at which coal was unloaded. There was also a coal loader, the Balmain Coal Loader at White Bay, from around 1935 until it closed in October 1991, but it was only used for loading coal for the most part from the western coalfields near Lithgow.

Coal was also unloaded on Botany Bay, from time to time, at the Government Pier (or "Long Pier") at Botany and also at wharves located on the banks of the Alexandra Canal (also known as Shea's Creek).

=== Steamship coal bunkering and export operations ===
==== Bunkering by sixty-milers ====
Steamships requiring bunker coal at Sydney Harbour could have their bunkers loaded directly from a sixty-miler standing alongside. This bunkering operation was common, especially before the mechanised Ball's Head Coal Loader opened in 1920 and before there were mechanised coal hulks in operation. Steamship companies preferred the coal of southern coalfields, because it burned with little smoke. However, bunker coal came by sixty-miler ships from both the northern and southern coalfields.

===== "Coal lumping" gangs =====
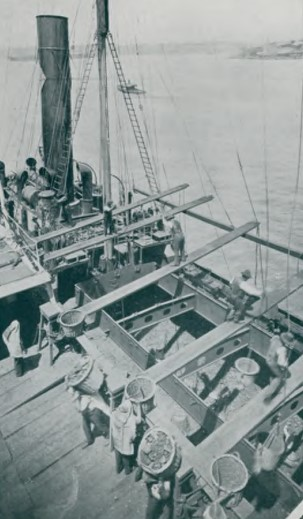
Coal lumping gangs coaling a ship from the hold of the sixty-miler Bellambi, in Sydney Harbour (c. 1909).

Inside the hold of the sixty-miler workers known as "shovellers" would shovel the coal by hand into coal baskets that were limited by regulation to a weight of two hundredweight (one-tenth of a ton, or approx. 100 kg). From 1900, the physical size and weight of the basket itself was also limited by regulation; an empty basket could not weigh more than 30 pounds, around 13.6 kg.

The coal baskets were hoisted out of the hold of the sixty-miler. A worker—the leader of the gang, known as a 'planksman'—working on a 16-inches wide plank suspended high above the hold of the sixty-miler and level with the steamship's rail, would walk along the plank and swing the suspended basket over the steamship's rail. From there other workers—known as 'carriers'—would carry it on their shoulders and tip it into the steamship's bunker chutes. Inside the steamship's bunkers, other workers known as "trimmers" distributed the coal within the bunker. The work of the winch-driver, while less physically taxing, involved great mental strain; any miscalculation in hoisting or braking, could result in death or serious injury to the others in the gang. These workers, collectively known as "coal lumpers", may have been the most highly paid casual employees of their time, but their pay recognised the arduous, extremely dirty and highly dangerous nature of the work. The workers had a trade union, Sydney Coal Lumpers' Union, registered in 1881.

Serious injuries or deaths occurred frequently. Falls were, by far, the most common cause, with falls from the plank being a particular risk. Another significant accident scenario was when objects or coal fell upon coal lumpers who were working below. In 1924, the lost life of a coal lumper was worth £600.

Work was carried out day and night, except in wet weather, so that bunkering was reasonably fast. A complete gang of 1 "planksman", 4 "shovellers", 1 winch-driver, with 4 "carriers" and "trimmers" could move about 9.5 tons per hour. The number of gangs that could be put on bunkering a ship was set by the receiving space of the ship and the number of planks that could be suspended from gaffs on the masts of the sixty-miler. The Bellambi could suspend sufficient planks to allow twelve gangs to work, allowing a coaling rate of over 100 tons per hour if the receiving ship was of a suitable design.

Such rapid coaling was not without its own hazards. The 5,524 tonne passenger steamer Austral was being coaled—apparently without due care taken of its trim—and developed a list. When the waterline on the starboard side reached lower portholes, which had been left open, the ship keeled over and sank off Kirribilli Point on 11 November 1882.

===== Semi-mechanised bunkering by "sixty milers" =====
Some 'sixty-milers'—such as the Stockrington—had their own lifting gear with grabs and were capable of coaling other ships; these semi-mechanised operations continued after the loader opened at Ball's Head.

==== Mechanised coal hulks ====
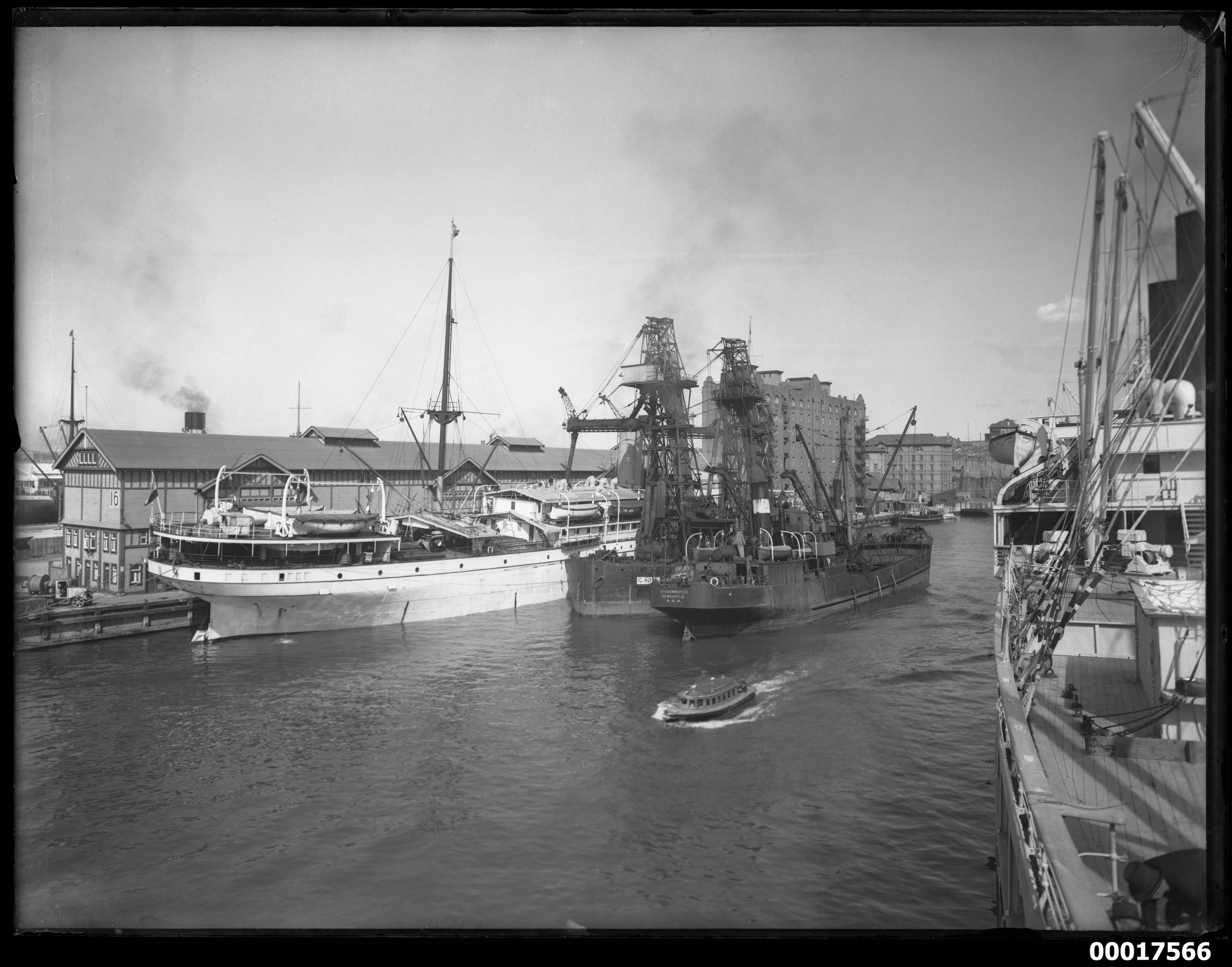
Vessels moored at Wharf 16, Pyrmont, Sydney Harbour in 1925. (unknown photographer, Australian National Maritime Museum) The "sixty-miler" Stockrington is on the right. The mechanised coal hulk Sampson, is between Stockrington and the (unknown) vessel at the wharf.

Mechanised coal hulks were used on Sydney Harbour. Hulks could be loaded at an on-shore loader or from "sixty-milers", including those with a self-discharging capability such as the Stockrington. Without propulsion of their own, the hulks were towed into position by tugboats.

Once alongside the vessel receiving the coal, the mechanised coal hoists aboard the hulk were used to load the coal directly to the bunker chutes or bulk cargo holds of the vessel. It seems that it was common practice to coal a ship moored at a wharf, using a mechanised coal hulk with a "sixty-miler" standing alongside (see photograph). Coal discharged from the "sixty-miler" to the hulk would be loaded directly to the ship. However, once the hold of the "sixty-miler" was exhausted, the mechanised coal hulk could continue bunkering using a reserve of coal that it held in its own hold.

Coaling a ship still required a gang of "trimmers" to distribute the coal inside the coal bunkers of the ship being coaled; this had the effect that the coaling rate of the mechanised coal hulk was limited to the rate at which the "trimmers" distributed the coal. However, a major advantage was that bunkering could take place in wet weather, when manual coaling could not.

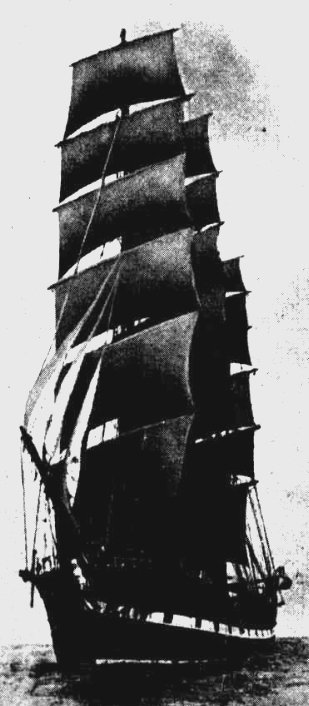
Fortuna, as a barque.

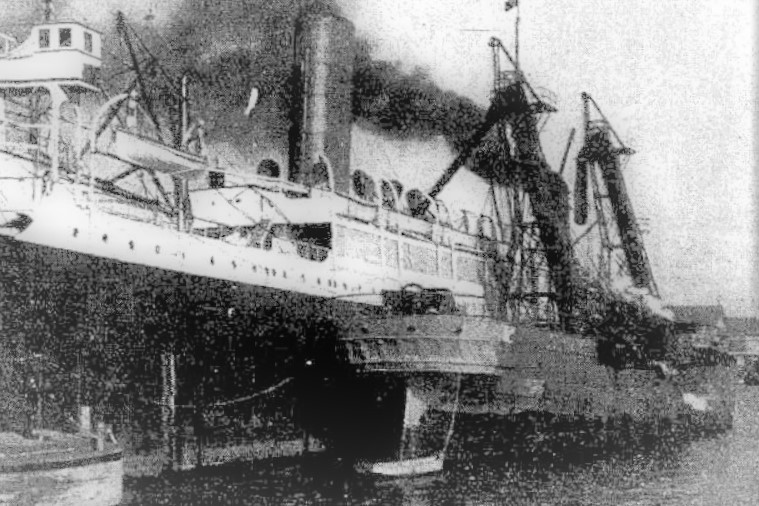
Fortuna—still with the stern of a former sailing ship—coaling a liner at Circular Quay in 1923. (unknown photographer, Sydney Mail, 28 November 1923, Page 41)

The Fortuna, a mechanised coal hulk owned by the Wallarah Coal Co., was used for coal bunkering and ship-loading on Sydney Harbour. This strange-looking vessel was a familiar sight on the harbour for the four decades between 1909 and 1949. Her equipment was steam powered, with two 60-foot high grabs on her starboard side for loading from a "sixty-miler". She could carry 2,250 tons of coal, and was capable of coaling a ship at a rate of 200 tons/hour. The Fortuna, was launched, in 1875, as a fully rigged, iron-hulled ship, the Melbourne, with accommodation for sixty passengers. She was sold and rechristened Macquarie in 1888 and, in 1903, rerigged as a barque. In 1905, she was sold to Norwegian interests. In 1909, she was stripped of her tall masts and figurehead—in the likeness of Queen Victoria—and was converted to a mechanised coal hulk, the Fortuna. Fortuna was also the name of an earlier coal hulk.

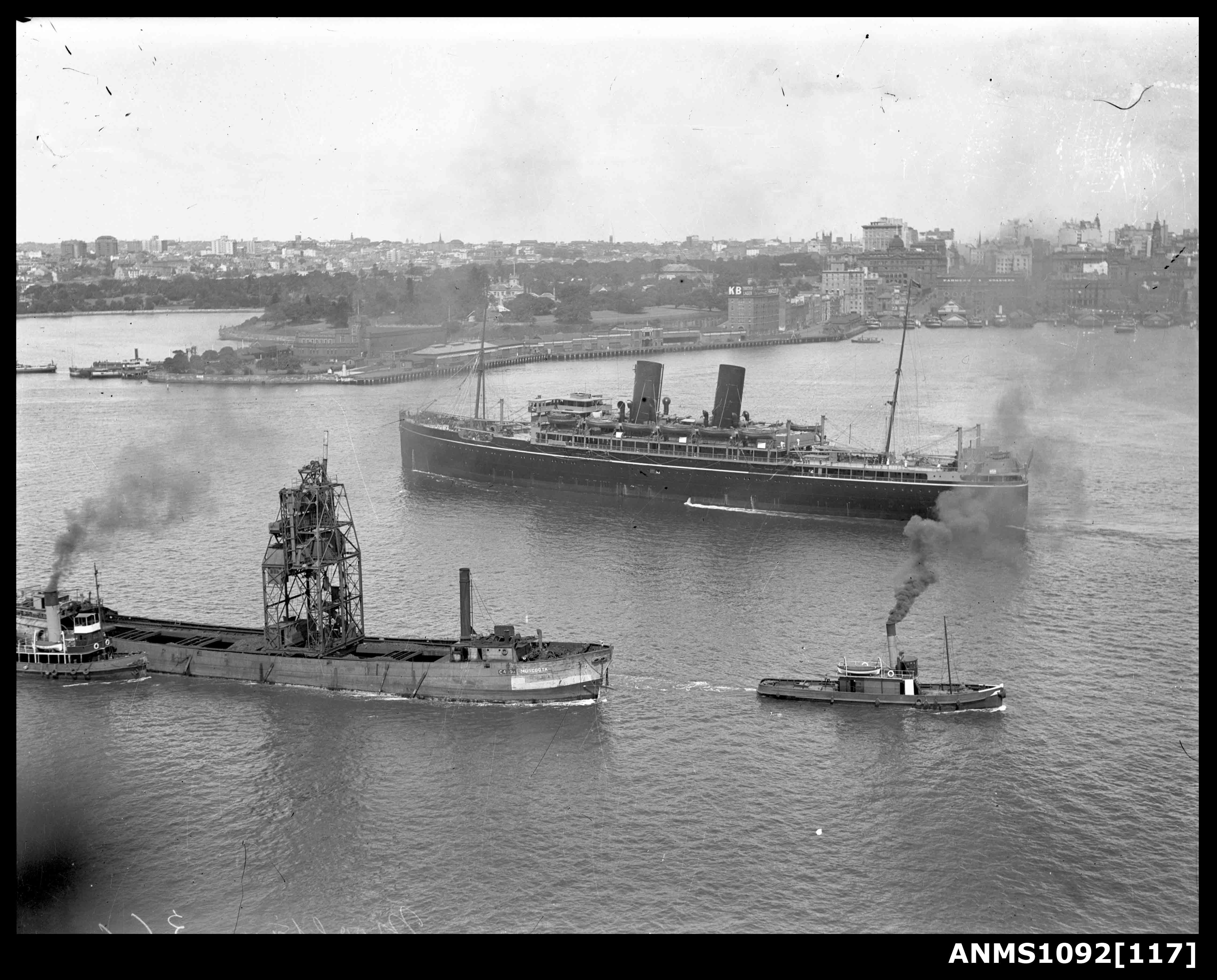
Mechanised coal hulk, Muscoota under tow by tugs in Sydney Harbour. (William Hall collection of the Australian National Maritime Museum)

By early 1925, the Bellambi Coal Company had introduced its own mechanised coal hulk, fitting an old coal hulk Samson with two coal hoists. This vessel was still working into the early 1930s at least. The coal-handling equipment aboard Sampson was powered electrically and capable of coaling at 240 tons per hour. Sampson had grabs which were used to transfer coal from a 'sixty-miler.' The "sixty miler" Bellambi (formerly Five Islands) was modified so its holds could be readily accessed by the grabs of Sampson.

After lying idle in Sydney Harbour from 1922, the barque Muscoota was sold in 1924 and converted—at the Mort's Dock, in 1925—to be a second mechanised coal hulk for Wallarah Coal Company. As a coal hulk, the Muscoota had only one electrically powered coal hoist. She carried 4,000 tons of coal. In 1943, she was refitted and was towed to Milne Bay, New Guinea, in early 1944, to recoal ships there. She was involved in an accident with a Dutch steamer during a storm, following which she was towed to nearby Discovery Bay, where she sank slowly.

==== Balls Head Coal Loader ====
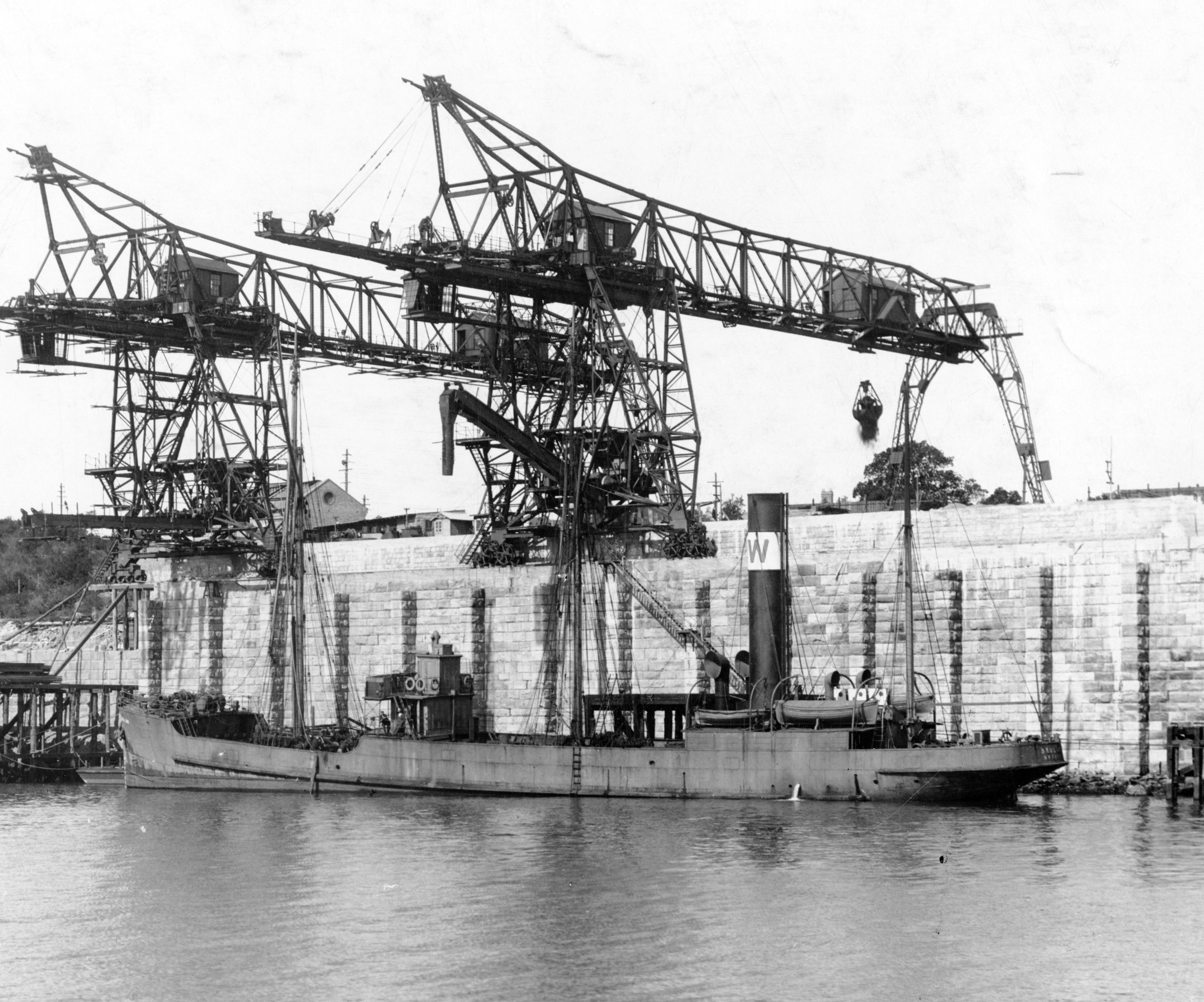
Beulah unloading at Balls Head, in 1930, showing the two original gantry cranes and the stockpile area. (Graham Andrews Working Harbour Collection)

The Balls Head Coal Loader, at Waverton on the Lower North Shore, opened in 1920. It was owned and operated by the Sydney Coal Bunkering Co., a subsidiary of the Union Steamship Co. It was mainly used for bunkering steamships using the port of Sydney but also supplied some coal to local hospitals and other customers needing heating coal.

Coal was unloaded, from the holds of "sixty-milers" moored parallel to the shoreline by two gantry cranes fitted with grabs—later reduced to one crane, after the other suffered irreparable storm damage (causing the death of a crane driver) in 1940—and was deposited into a stockpile located on a raised platform constructed of sandstone and concrete. The unloading and stockpiling operation was known as 'No.1 Plant'.

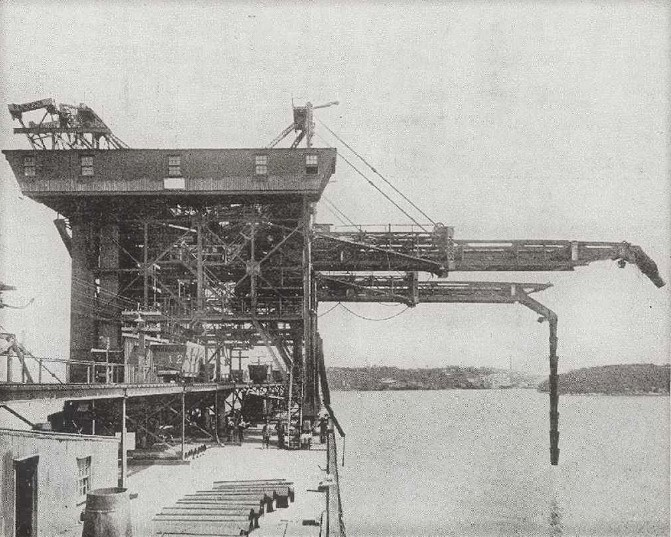
Balls Head - Loader and skips, c. 1926

It is known, from photographs taken during the mid-1920s and around 1930, that both gantry unloading cranes also carried a hopper and loading chute arrangement that allowed them to load coal as well as unload it. These were later removed, and their precise purpose remains unclear; possibly it was to provide bunker coal for ships moored alongside the unloading wharf, or possibly it was for loading coal hulks.

The loading operation was highly automated for its time; it used a loading system supplied by an American company, the Mead Morrison Company. Coal fell via chutes in the base of the stockpile, into skips—of four tons capacity each—that were drawn by a continuous cable through tunnels below the stockpile and onto the loading wharf, a timber structure perpendicular to the shoreline. Thirty-three skips, running on a rail track of 20-inch gauge, were spaced along 3,200 feet (980 metres) of steel cable that moved at 3 miles/hour. The system was capable of loading ships at 700 tonnes per hour. The loading plant was known as 'No.2 Plant.'

The loader was operated by the Wallarah Coal Co.—the company that also operated the Catherine Hill Bay ocean jetty and two mechanised coal hulks on Sydney Harbour—from 1934 to 1964, when it closed for the first time.

It was taken over by Coal & Allied Industries and reopened as a coal export terminal in 1967. In 1976, the cable loading system was replaced by a system of conveyor belts capable of loading at 1,000 tonnes per hour. A comparison of photographs, from the 1920s, 1960s and 1970s, shows that the gantry unloading crane was replaced, at some point either in or before 1969.

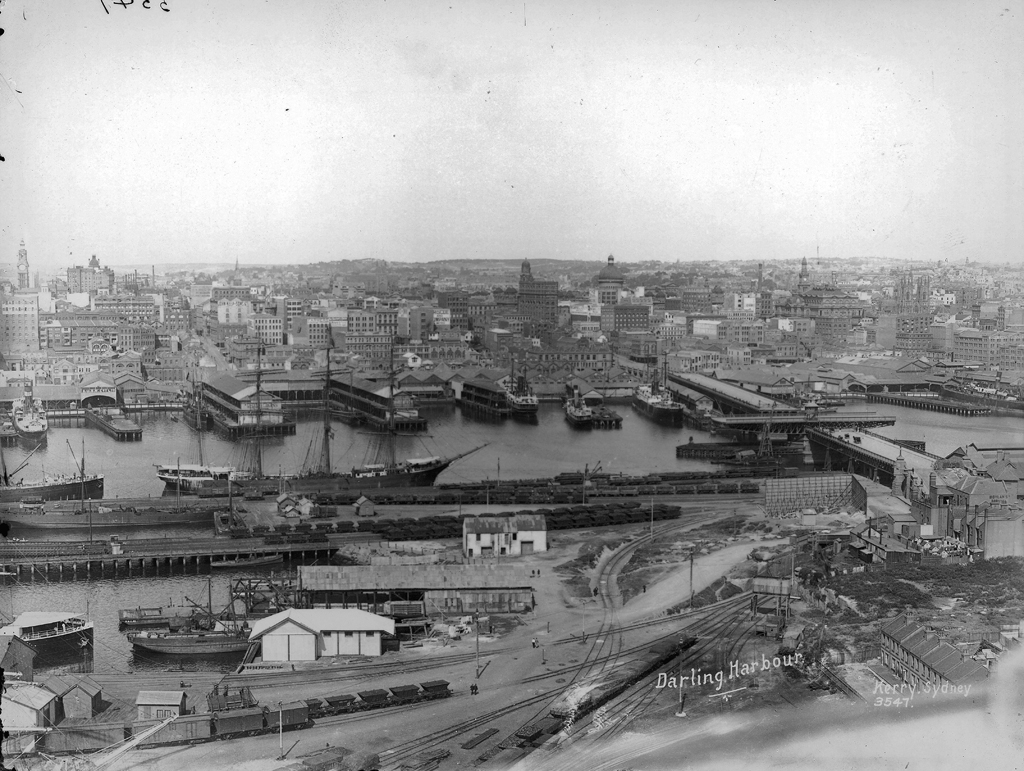
Darling Harbour 1900—The Pyrmont coal wharves are in the foreground. (Tyrrell Photo. Collection, Powerhouse Museum)

==== Pyrmont coal wharves ====
There were coal wharves, at Pyrmont on the western shore of Darling Harbour, where coal was sometimes unloaded but, more commonly, was loaded. The Pyrmont Coal wharves were connected to the government rail system and land transport to and from these wharves was by rail. There were at least two coal cranes at Pyrmont by 1892. Coal bunkering also took place at a "coal wharf" at Pyrmont. By 1930, there were coal elevators at the Pyrmont wharves.

In the 1870s, coal from Bulli Jetty was unloaded from "sixty-milers" at Sydney and then transported by rail to the Fitzroy Iron Works at Mittagong, as there was at the time no rail connection to Bulli.

=== Gasworks wharves ===
==== Australian Gas Light Company ====
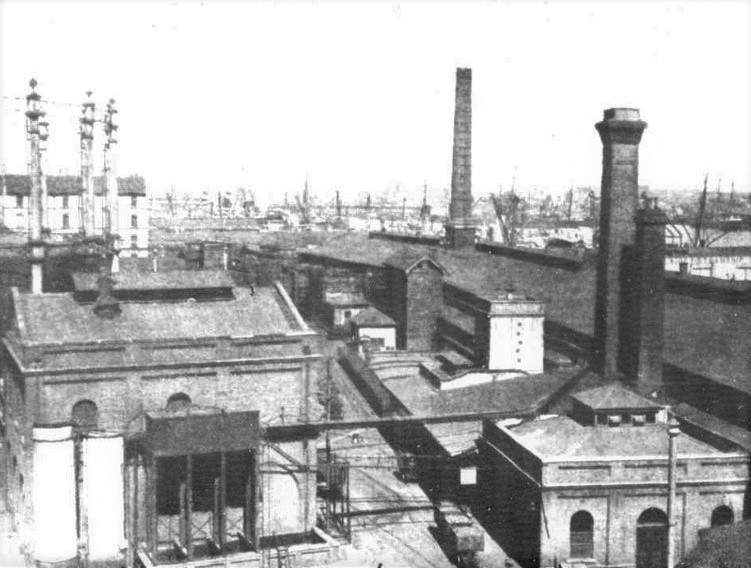
AGL gasworks at Millers Point (c.1917)

The Australian Gas Light Company (AGL)—established in 1837—operated two large gasworks.

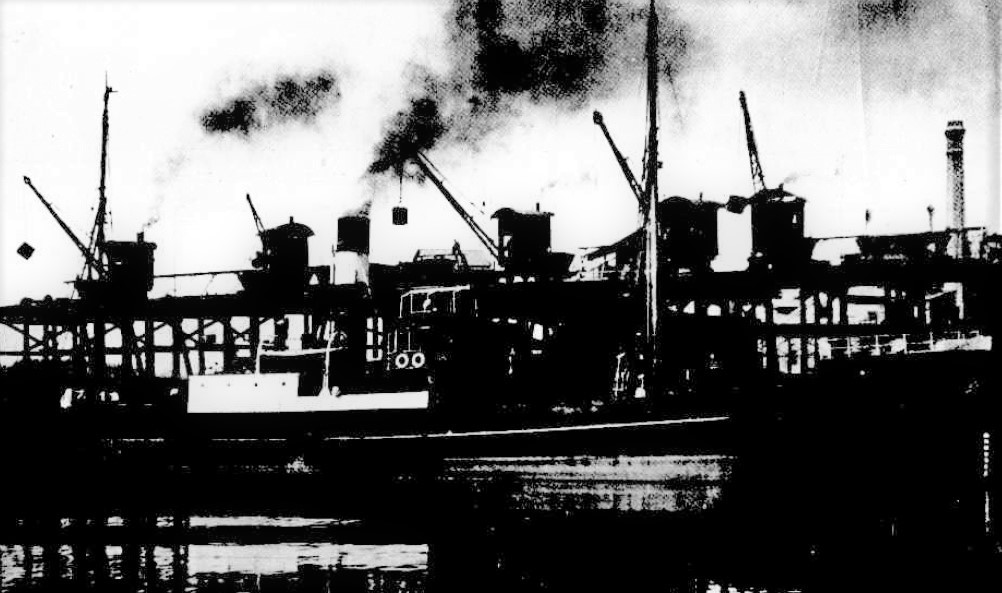
Unloading coal, Mortlake Gasworks, 1917

The first of these was at Millers Point and opened in 1841. It fronted Darling Harbour, where coal was unloaded. This gasworks closed in 1921.

AGL also operated, for a time, two smaller gasworks, at Balmain and Five Dock. As it became apparent that Sydney would grow into a much larger city, AGL decided to consolidate its operations at a larger works.

A new plant was opened in 1886 on a 32-hectare (79-acre) site at Mortlake on the Parramatta River.

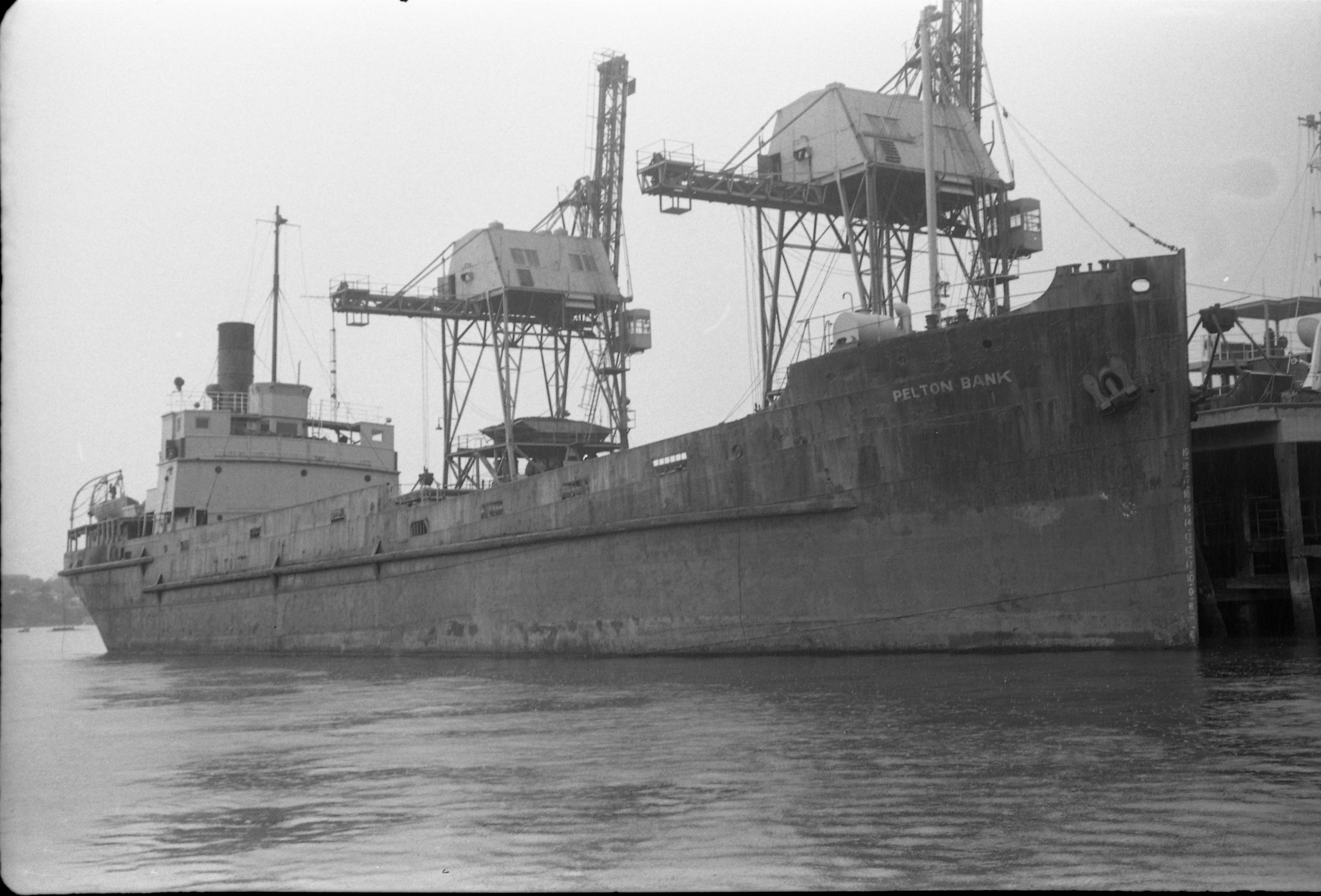
The "Sixty-miler" Pelton Bank moored at Mortlake Gasworks, 1968 (Vic Solomons, City of Sydney Archive)

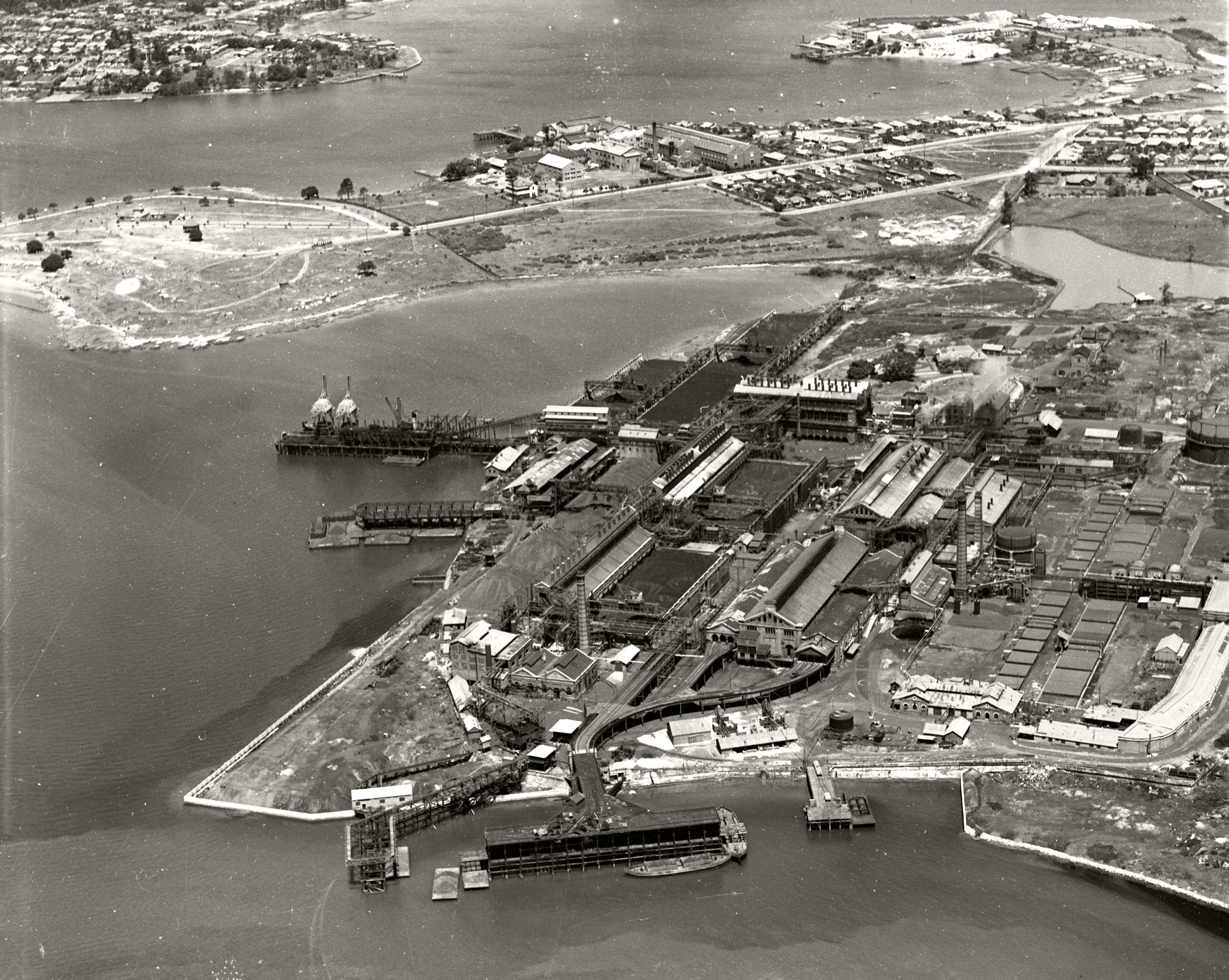
AGL Gasworks at Mortlake in 1937. The original coal wharf is in the foreground with the new coal jetty to the left of centre. Royal Australian Historical Society, Adastra Aerial Photography Collection

At full production, the Mortlake gasworks consumed nearly 460,000 tons of coal in a year, all of it delivered to its wharf by "sixty-milers". The Mortlake works alone needed about three "sixty-milers" to keep it supplied.

The original coal wharf at the Mortlake gasworks was a T-shaped structure located at the end of Breakfast Point. The unloading arrangements at Breakfast Point were that the coal was shovelled into large metal tubs by coal lumpers working inside the holds of the sixty-miler. The tubs were lifted out of the hold by cranes on the wharf—a mix of steam and electric—and transported off the wharf in rail wagons hauled by steam locomotives.

Within the Mortlake gasworks site, there were 11 km of three-foot gauge railway lines, over which six steam locomotives operated.

Unloading a 1000-ton "sixty-miler", in 1920, required a total of forty-nine workers per shift: five crane drivers, five tippers, five wharfmen, two locomotive drivers, two shunters, and thirty coal lumpers.

From 1937, coal unloading was carried out by grab cranes on a new jetty on Kendall Bay and transported from the wharf by conveyor belt, ending the dangerous and arduous—but well-paid—occupation of "coal lumping" at Mortlake.

==== North Shore and Manly ====
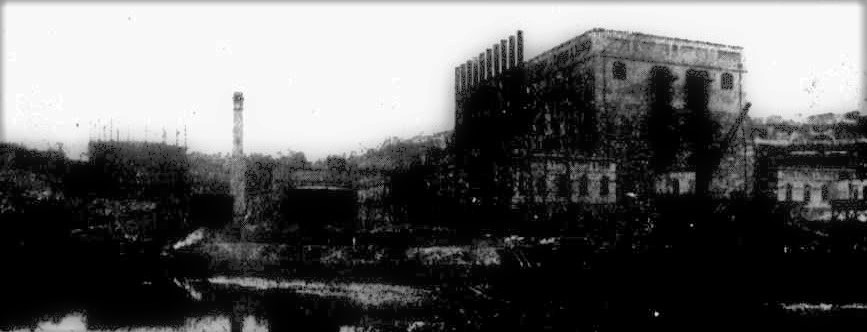
Gasworks of North Shore Gas Company, at Oyster Cove (now known as Balls Head Bay), Waverton, c. 1920

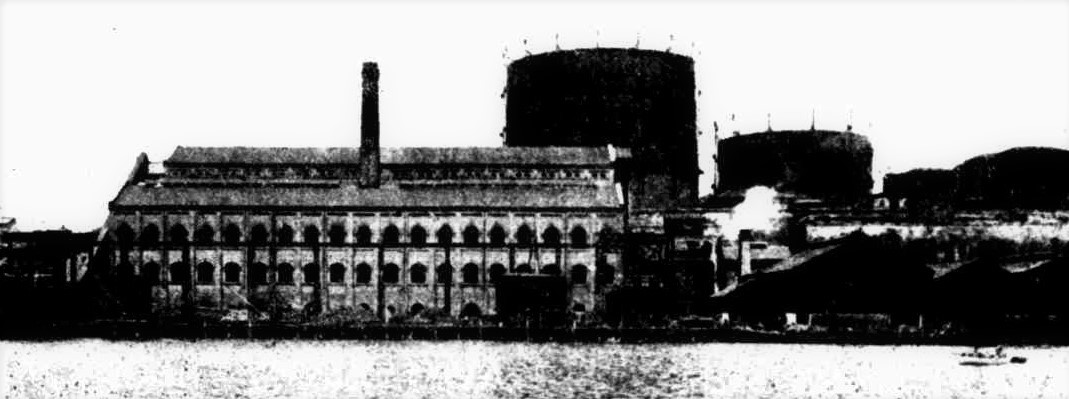
Neutral Bay Gasworks of the North Shore Gas Company. c. 1920

The North Shore Gas Company—established in 1875—operated two gasworks on the Lower North Shore. The first of these was established at Neutral Bay in 1876.

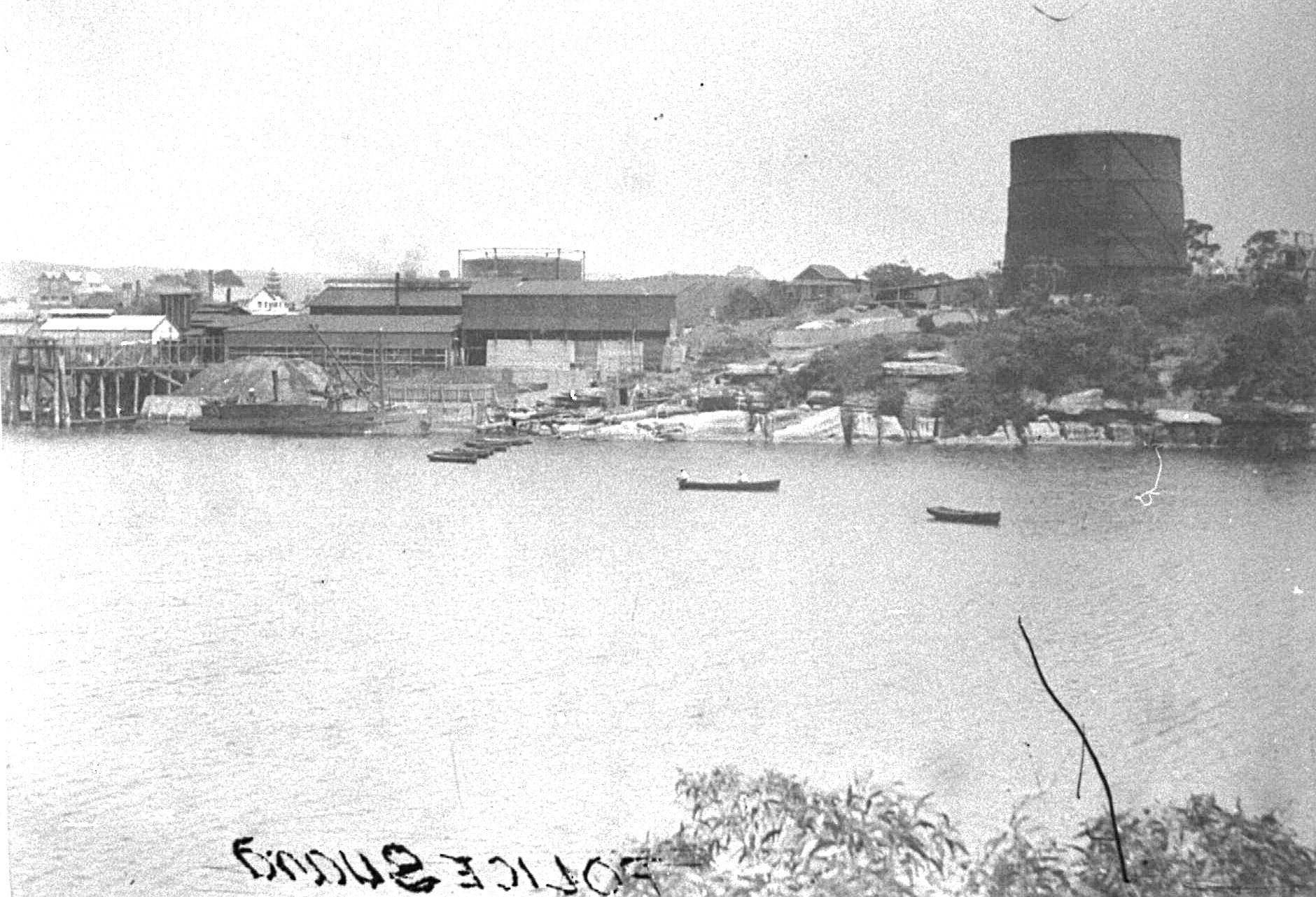
Manly gasworks, before 1930, viewed from the Quarantine Station. The coal wharf is on the left. (Graeme Andrews, Working Harbour Collection, City of Sydney Archives)

The second and larger works was at Waverton and was opened in 1917. In 1937, the aging plant at Neutral Bay was closed. Both these plants had wharves for unloading coal. The Waverton plant was dominated by a massive enclosed coal store.

In 1943, the gas mains of the Australian Gaslight Company and the North Shore Gas Company were interconnected to allow either company to supply the other company's customers, in case of wartime damage to one gasworks.

There was a gasworks at Little Manly Point. The operator of this gasworks, Manly Gas Company Limited, was taken over by the North Shore Gas Company in 1938, but continued to make gas at the Manly site. Coal was unloaded at a wharf on the Spring Cove side of the site. Manly obtained at least some of its coal from the Balmain Colliery, but over the years most to its coal came by sea.

==== Parramatta ====
There was also a small gasworks, at Parramatta, operated by the Parramatta Gas Company from 1873. After it was purchased by AGL, it was closed down in 1891 and its customers were supplied from Mortlake.

Although it was on the south bank of Parramatta River, the Parramatta gasworks was too far upstream for berthing a "sixty-miler". The closest deep-water wharf was the Redbank Wharf, near the confluence of the river and Duck River, from where a steam tramway ran past the gasworks site on its way to the township. However, there was a wharf at the gasworks itself and coal, most likely, would have been landed there from coal lighters.

=== Blackwattle Bay coal wharves and depots ===
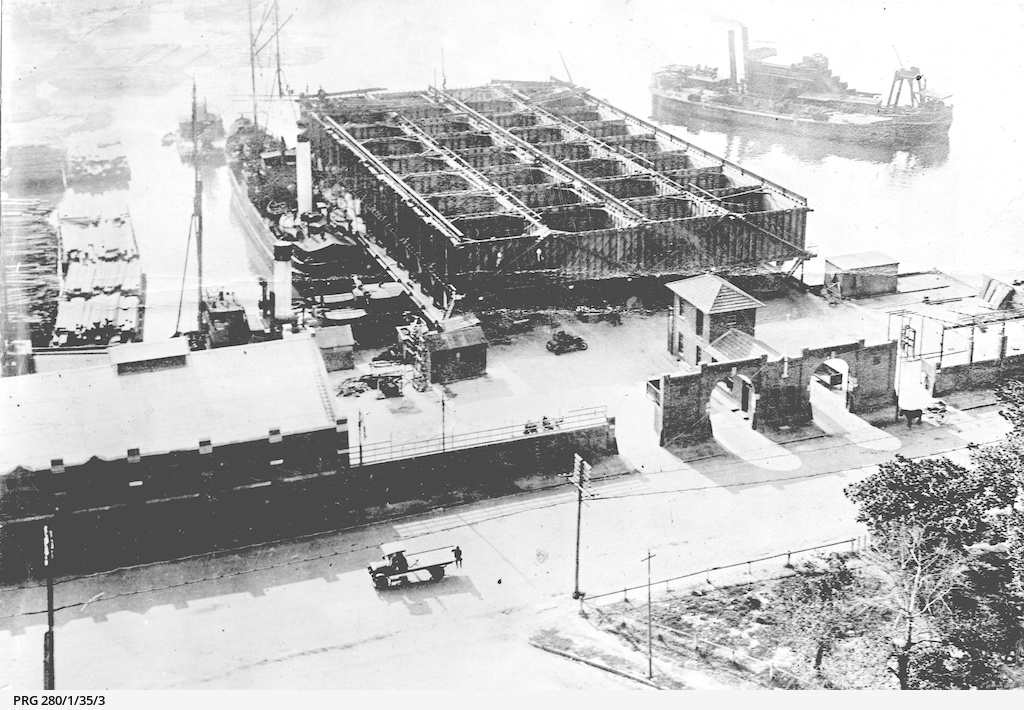
Howard Smith coal bunkers at Blackwattle Bay, with a "sixty-miler" alongside (State Library of South Australia). This photograph was taken from the top of the shot tower of Sydney Lead Works, at Glebe, demolished c.1950.

Blackwattle Bay is an inlet lying between the Pyrmont Peninsula and Glebe Point to the east of Rozelle Bay. Blackwattle Bay was once much larger in area. The shallow part of the inlet—then known as Blackwattle Swamp—was filled in, in the late C19th, to create what is now Wentworth Park.

There were three coal depots at Blackwattle Bay, located between the reclaimed shoreline and Pyrmont Bridge Road. Coal arrived by sea on "sixty-milers" and was distributed to resellers and other customers by road transport.

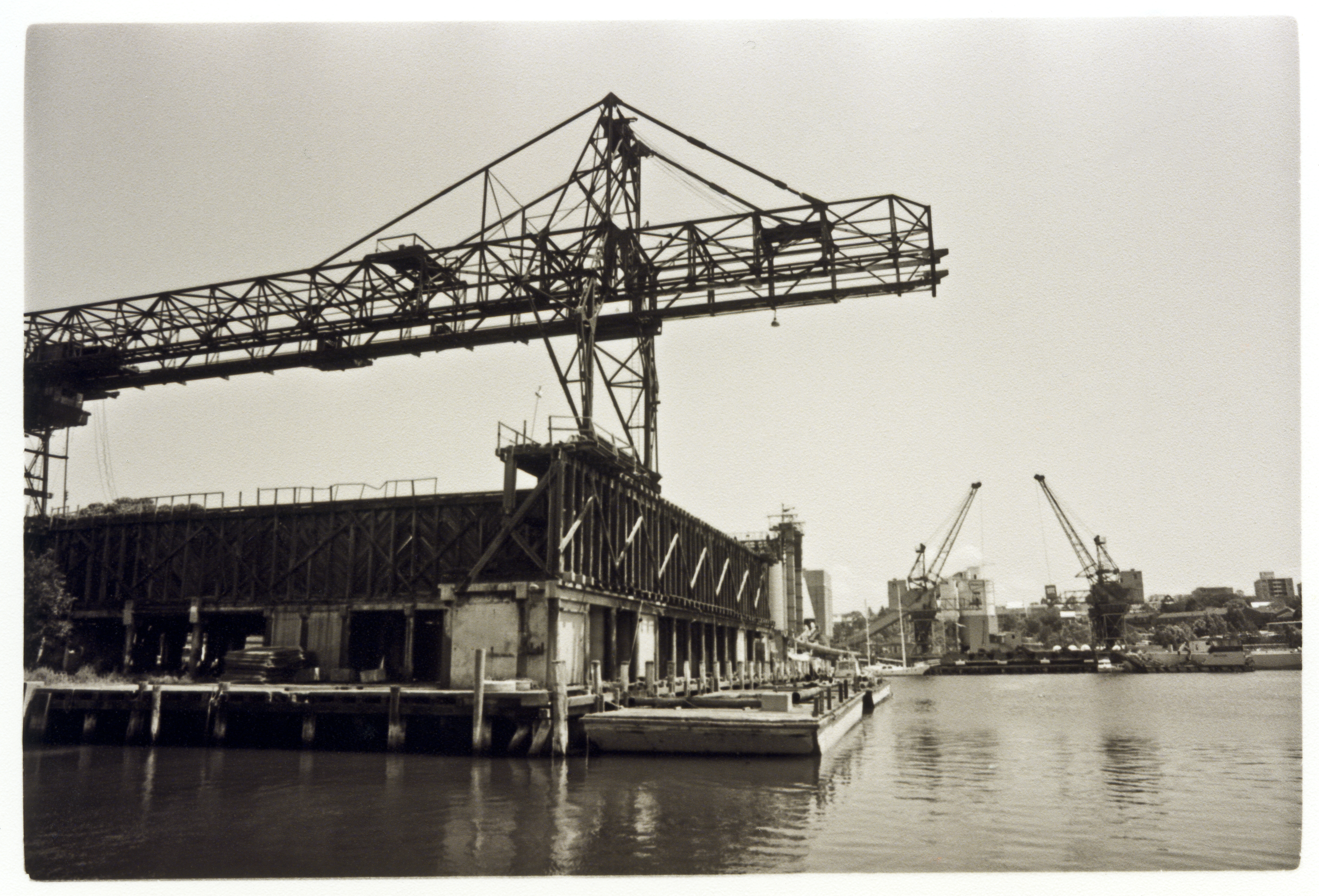
Disused Coal Wharf 21, originally Jones Brothers Coal and later Coal and Allied, at Blackwattle Bay (in 1994), with the R.W. Miller unloading cranes in the right background. (City of Sydney Archives).

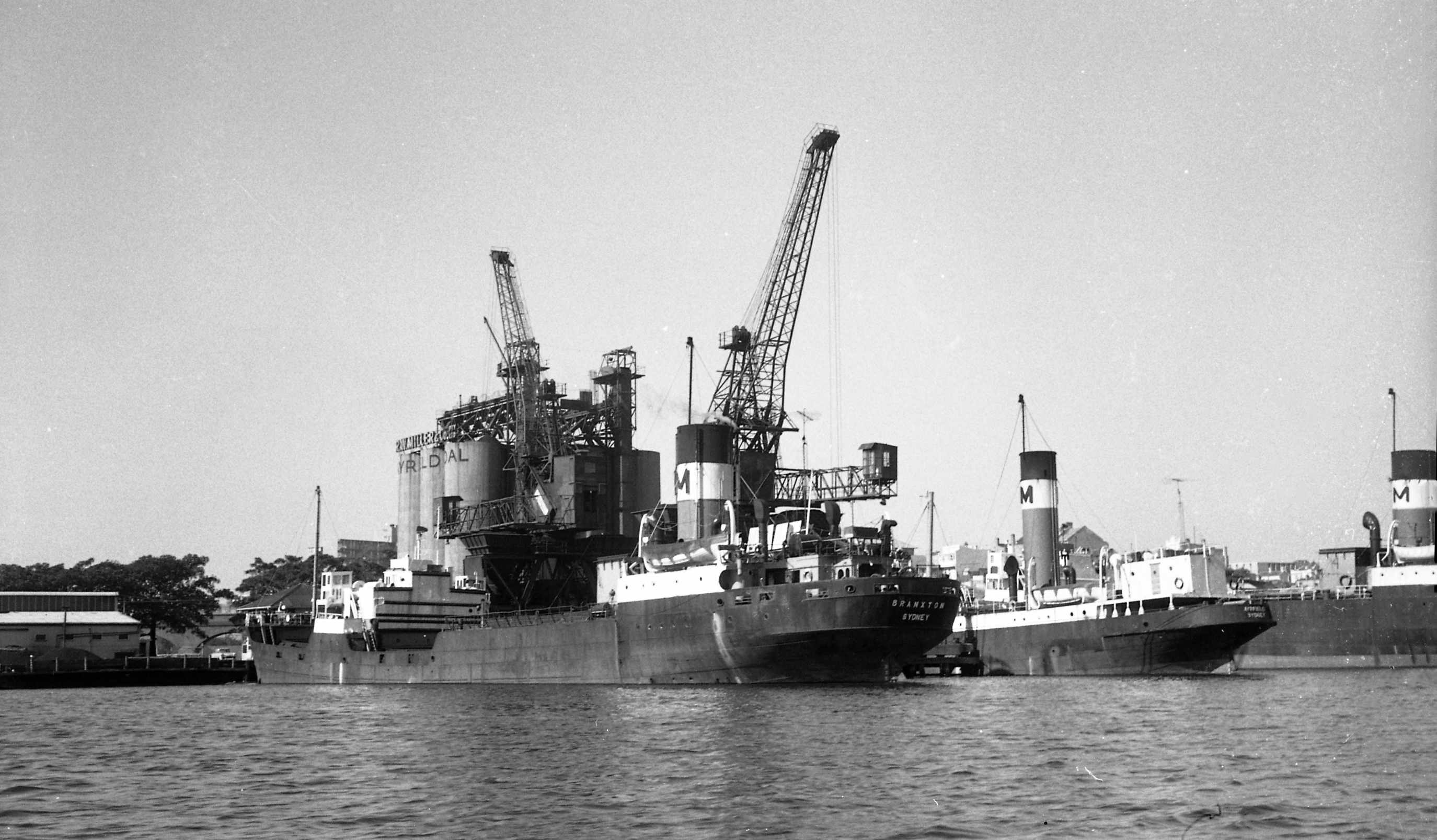
R.W. Miller's wharf at Blackwattle Bay, with three "sixty-milers", in May 1968 (Vic Solomons, City of Sydney Archives)

The most easterly was Wharf 21, operated by Jones Brothers Coal Co.. It opened around 1926, after Jones Brothers expanded their operations and relocated, from Darling Harbour at the bottom of Bathurst St. In its final form, this installation consisted of a timber wharf—with ships berthing parallel to the shoreline—a gantry crane with a grab for unloading, and a bunker structure. The first level of the bunker structure was made of concrete and brick and it had coal bunkers made of hardwood timber as its second level. The two long edges of the bunker structure carried rails for the travelling gantry crane. It appears that the coal bunker structure and gantry crane dated from around 1951.

West from Jones Brothers was R W Miller & Co.'s wharf—perpendicular to the shoreline—and further west was Wharf No. 25, the business of Howard Smith. The Howard Smith coal wharf was already in operation by 1922.

In its later years, the R.W.Miller wharf had two large grab unloading cranes that fed wharf conveyors, ultimately feeding into any of six tall silos, arranged as two groups of three silos each. The east-facing side of the silos carried the words "Ayrfield Coal". By that time, the old Howard Smith coal bunkers had been demolished, and their port area was being used to moor R.W. Miller ships.

The area at the head of Blackwattle Bay, adjacent to the coal wharves on the western end, was used for the unloading construction aggregate—from the 'Stone Fleet' ships—and timber.

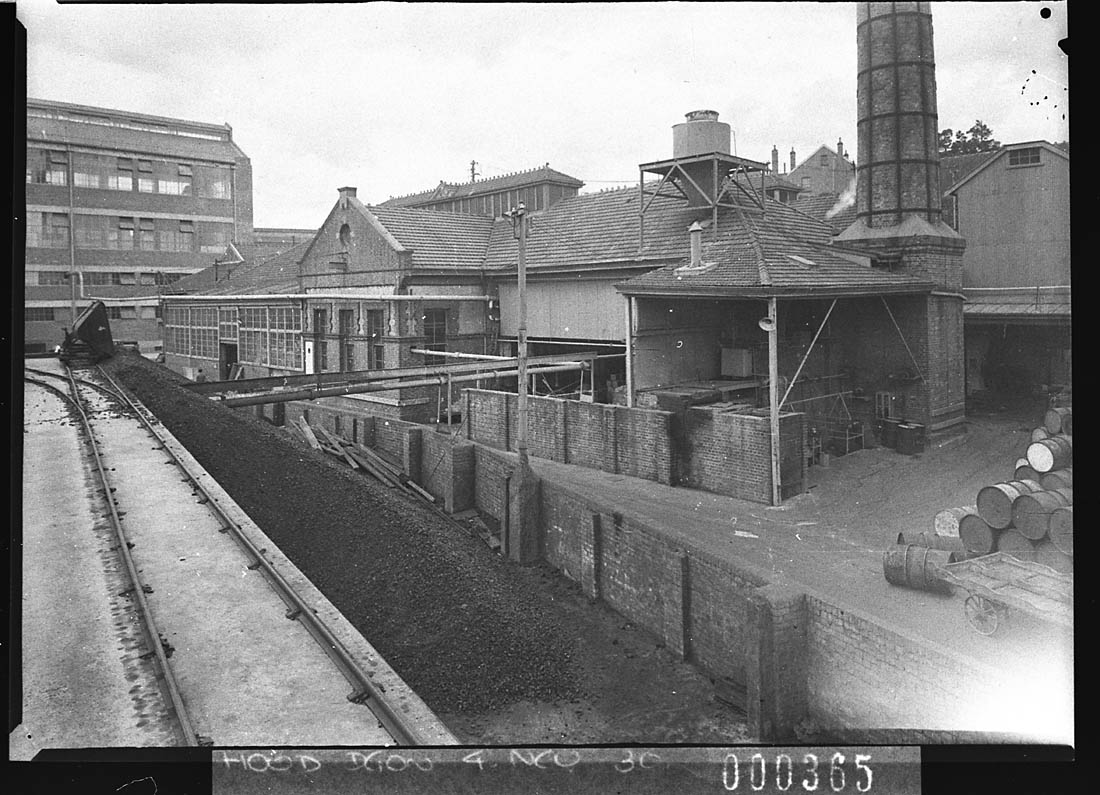
Lever Brothers factory (February 1939) Coal dump, rail line, and a tipping wagon used to bring coal from the wharf. (Hood, Sam, 1872–1953, from collection of the State Library of NSW)

=== Other customers for coal on Sydney Harbour ===
Some industrial customers had their own wharves at which coal could be unloaded. Colonial Sugar Refinery (CSR) at Pyrmont had two grab cranes for unloading raw sugar in bulk, which could also be used to unload coal—from 'sixty-milers'—or other bulk cargoes when necessary. Cockatoo Island Dockyard had a coal wharf and two coal bunkers, on the south-western side of the island immediately to the north of the Sutherland Dock. Coal was used as fuel by the powerhouse that supplied Cockatoo Island's electricity, including power for the dock pumps. The Nestlé chocolate factory at Abbotsford had a wharf with a coal bunker (located at the water-end) for the coal used to power its boilers. Coal for the Balmain Power Station was landed from barges at the waterfront until 1965. The Lever Brothers factory, on White Bay at Balmain landed coal as well as copra at its wharf. Another customer for coal was the North Head Quarantine Station, until it converted its boilerhouse—used to generate electricity and to raise steam for autoclaving—to oil-fired operation in 1920.

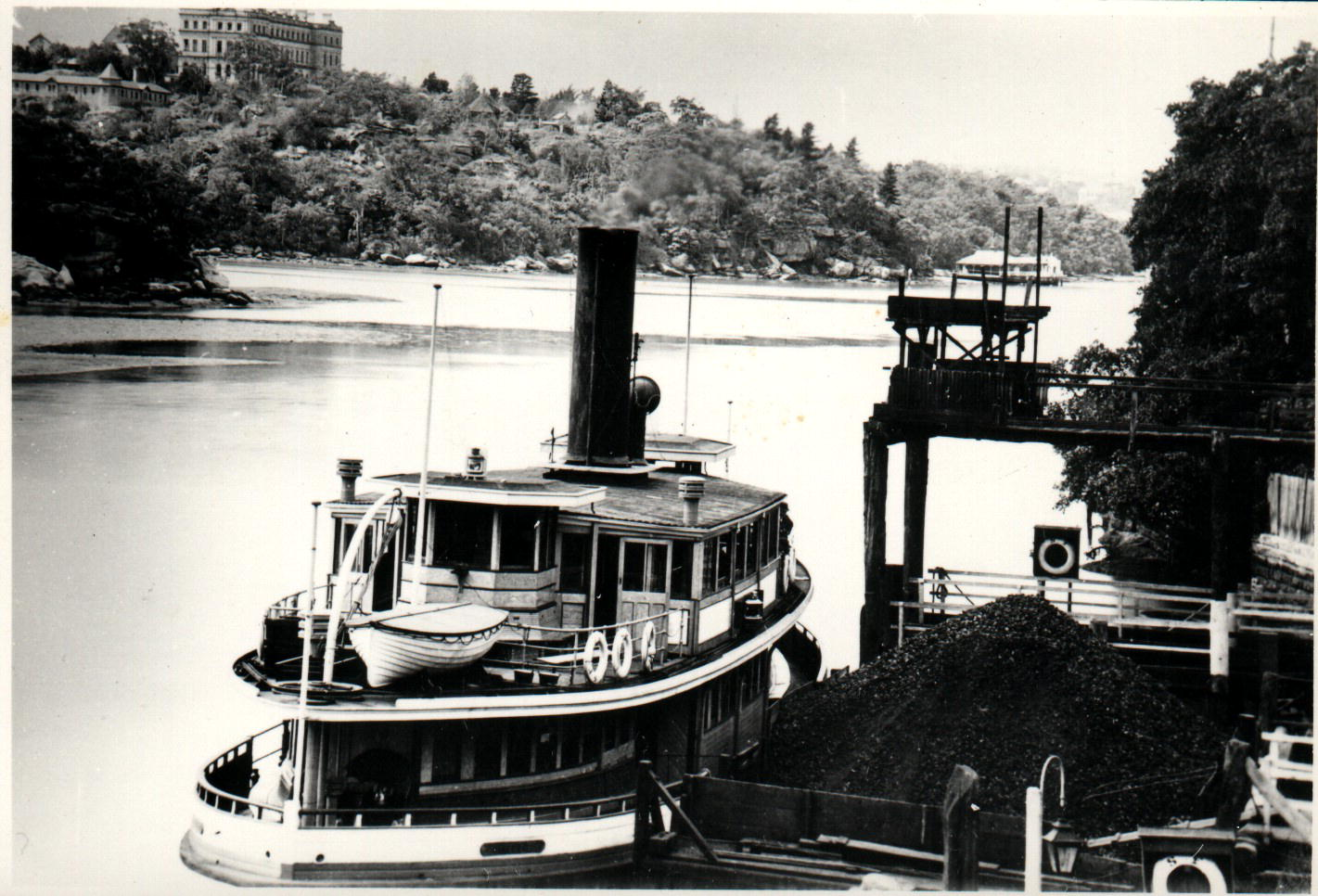
Lady Ferguson alongside Fig Tree ferry depot c. 1915, with coal stockpile on right

Coal was distributed by coal lighters (or barges); the R.W. Miller company had its origins in operation of coal lighters on Sydney Harbour. Some coal during the period from 1897 to 1931 was sourced locally from the Balmain Colliery and distributed by coal lighter. The Balmain Colliery had a wharf at which ships took on bunker coal. There were numerous foreshore industrial sites on Sydney Harbour and, particularly prior to the widespread use of electricity and fuel oil, many of those would have relied, as a source of energy, upon coal brought to their wharves by lighter.

Harbour ferries, in the age of steam ferries, were also significant users of coal. Ferry companies had depots on the foreshore, where coal was loaded. There was a depot on the right bank of the Lane Cove River, with a facility to load coal, near the Fig Tree Bridge. Other ferry depots were at Milsons Point and Kurraba Point.

The Sydney Harbour pilot boat, Captain Cook (1893), also relied on coal brought to Sydney by the 'sixty-milers'.

=== Botany Bay ===
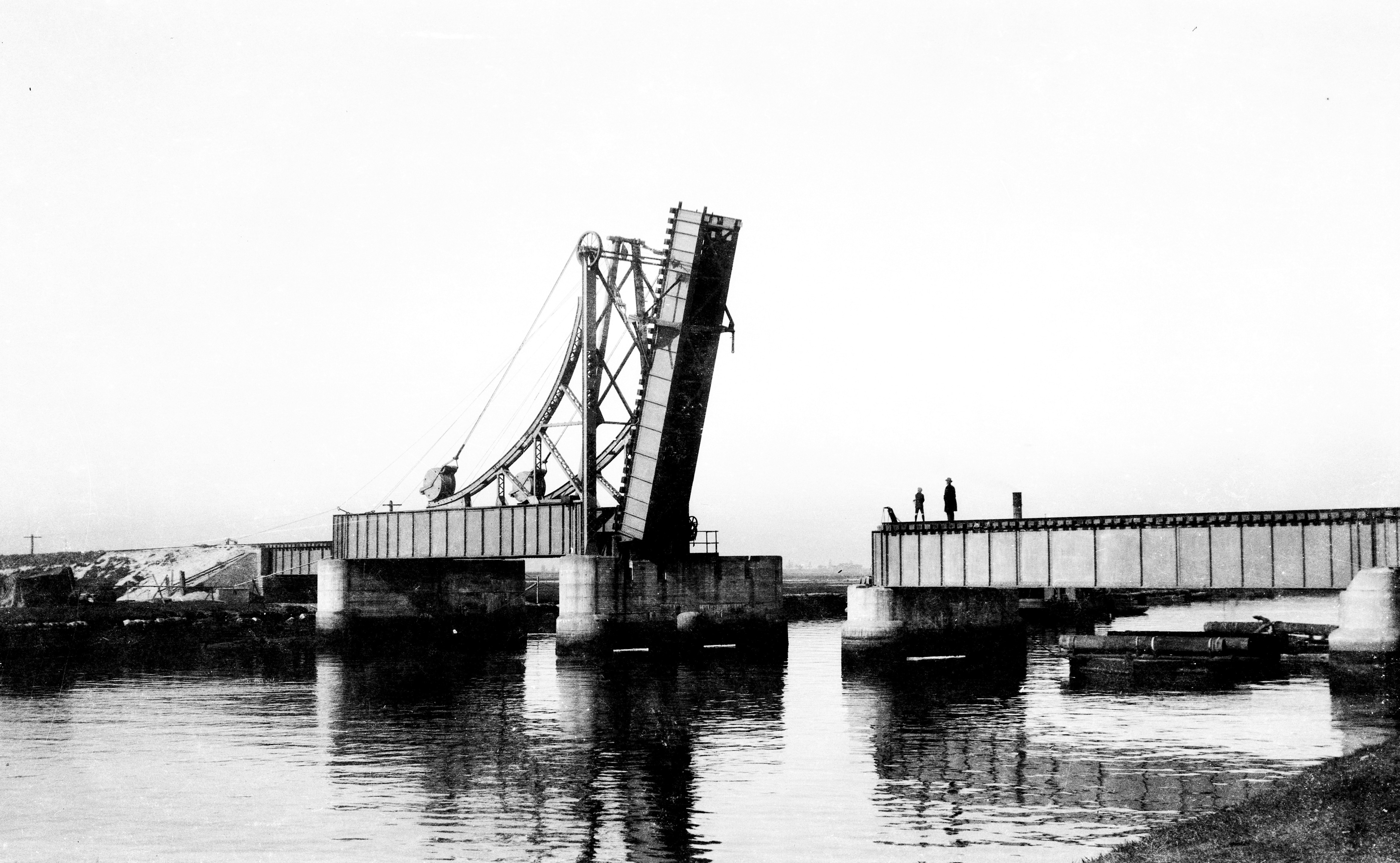
Old railway bridge on the Alexandra Canal (1925)

Although far less important than Sydney Harbour as a coal port, some coal was unloaded at the "Government Pier" (or "Long Pier")—constructed in 1885—at Botany on the northern shore of Botany Bay, near where Hill Street joins Botany Road today. The coal unloaded here was for nearby industrial users. Coal for the nearby Bunnerong Power Station—opened in 1929—came by rail.

Coal was also sometimes unloaded at wharves located on the banks of the Alexandra Canal (also known as Shea's Creek). The two bridges across the Alexandra Canal—the road bridge at Ricketty Street and the railway bridge—formerly had lifting spans to allow ships to pass.

Botany Bay was, in those days, a shallow port with sandbanks and the Alexandra Canal too was shallow; both could only be used by smaller ships.

== Decline and end of the trade ==
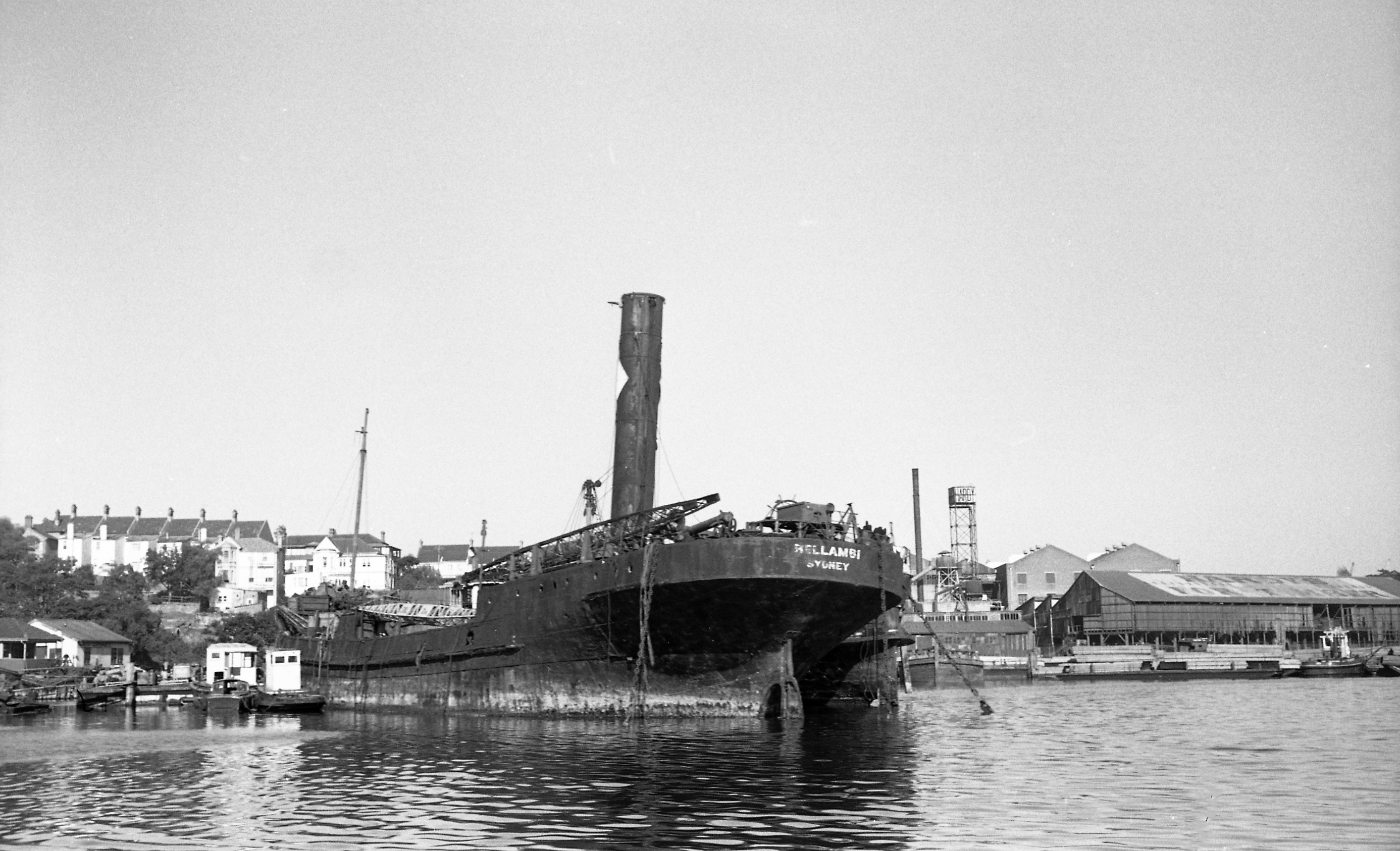
The old "sixty-miler", Bellambi, being broken up at Stride's Yard, Glebe in May 1968 (Vic Solomons, City of Sydney Archives)

Lake Macquarie ceased to be a coal port by the 1940s. The Swansea Channel was no longer dredged after the 1930s, and could no longer be used by even the small steamships that had used Lake Macquarie as a port.

The coastal coal carrying trade from the northern part of the southern coalfields ended relatively early, as the southern coalfield ocean jetties closed; the last two were the Bulli Jetty, (closed 1943) and the South Bulli Jetty at Bellambi (closed in 1952). Coal was last shipped from Wollongong Harbour in 1933. The remaining coastal trade from the southern coalfields used the one remaining port, Pt Kembla, and continued until the 1960s. Pt Kembla is now a coal export port.

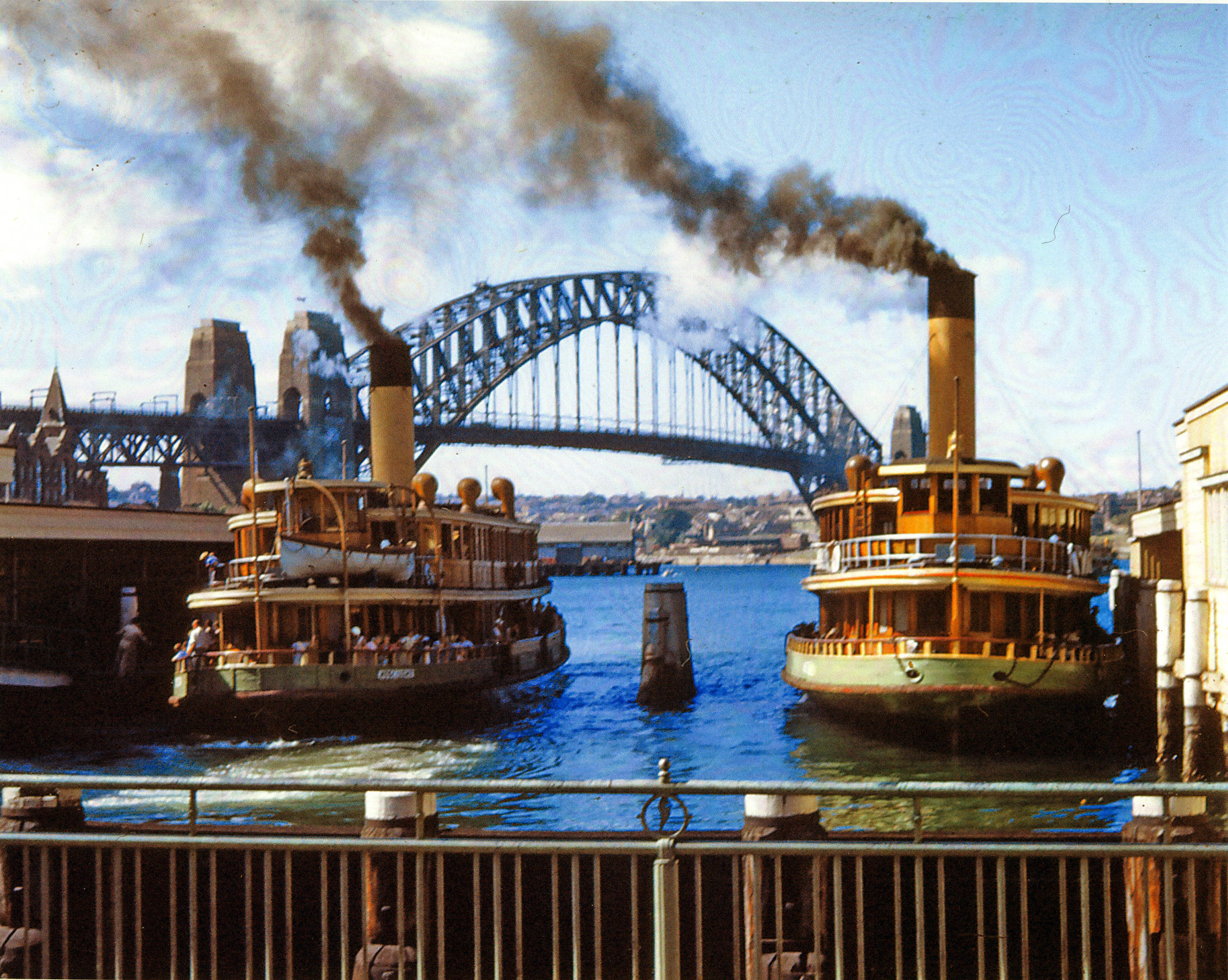
Kosciusko and Kubu, two of the last coal-burning steam ferries (1956).

Loaded coal train on the Richmond Vale Railway passing Stockrington. The closure of this line to Hexham, in 1987, brought an end to commercial steam-hauled rail operation in New South Wales, and was a precursor to the end of Hexham as a coal port.

The demand for bunkering coal declined, as coal-fuelled steamships became less common in the 1950s and 1960s. The 1950s saw the end of coal-fired steam-powered passenger ferries on Sydney Harbour; the last coal-burner, Kubu, was withdrawn from service in 1959, and others such as Lady Chelmsford had long since been converted to diesel motor vessels. The last steam-powered ferry, South Steyne, operated until 1973; it could burn coal but had always been fueled by oil.

The mechanised coal hulk, Fortuna, was converted to a coal barge in 1949. She ceased working altogether in 1953, and was towed to Putney Point and later scrapped.

In 1949, the wharves at Pyrmont were reconstructed and coal loading operations moved to White Bay at the Balmain Coal Loader.

The Ball's Head Coal Loader, which was mainly used to load bunker coal, ceased being used in 1963 and closed, for the first time, in 1964. The Manly Gasworks at Little Manly Point closed in 1964. Balmain Power Station closed in 1965.

31 December 1971 was a critical turning point; the huge Mortlake gasworks ceased making town gas from coal. Petroleum replaced coal as a feedstock for town gas-making, and oil refinery gas was purchased to supplement supply, during the interval until Sydney's gas was converted to natural gas in December 1976.

Although the Waverton gasworks site continued to be used until 1987, gas-making using coal ceased in 1969 when the plant was converted to use petroleum feedstock. All town gas making operations ceased with the conversion of the North Shore to natural gas. The North Shore Gas Company became 50% owned by AGL by 1974 and became a wholly owned subsidiary in 1980.

In the 1960s and 1970s there was a decline in the industrial use of coal—hospital and industrial heating was converted to other energy sources—as awareness of air pollution caused by burning black coal increased. Heavy fuel oil, a by-product of oil refining operations in Sydney, became more available, as an alternative fuel to coal for brickmaking, that was cleaner-burning and less bulky to transport and store. The government-owned railway network stopped using coal, once it had retired the last of its steam locomotives on 4 March 1973.

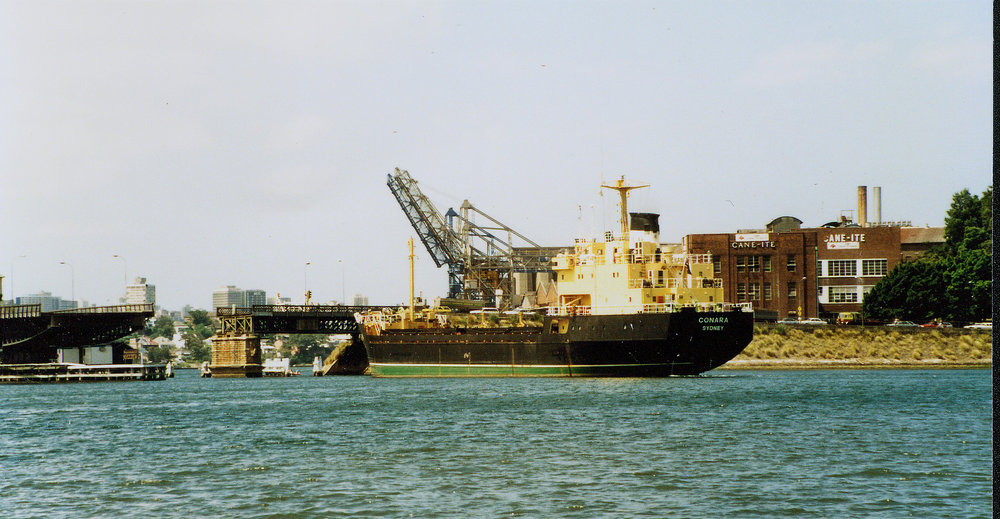
The "sixty-miler" Conara leaving Blackwattle Bay, probably for the last time, in 1989. In the centre background are the two grab unloaders at CSR Pyrmont (since demolished), and on the left is the opening swing span of the Glebe Island Bridge. (Graeme Andrews Working Harbour Photographic Collection, from City of Sydney Archives).

From the mid-1950s through the 1960s, there was a huge downturn in the coal industry, resulting in many mine closures, a number of company mergers—forming the Coal & Allied Industries group—and the rapid decline of the huge South Maitland coalfield that fed the port at Hexham. The privately owned Richmond Vale Railway to Hexham—the last line to use four-wheel 'non-air' coal wagons—closed in September 1987. The three coal loaders at Hexham closed in 1967, 1973 and 1988 respectively. The last ship to load coal at Hexham was the MV Camira in May 1988.

At Blackwattle Bay, Coal and Allied Operations Pty Ltd took over the R.W.Miller wharf, in 1960, and later bought Jones Brothers Coal Co., taking over operation of Wharf 21 and its coal bunker in 1972. After the closure of the last loader at Hexham, Conara continued to carry coal from Catherine Hill Bay to Blackwattle Bay. The coal unloader there closed too, and Coal and Allied relinquished their lease on the Blackwattle Bay coal wharves in 1995. MV Conara, was sold off, in December 1988; after several name changes, she was still in service as a bulk carrier, until at least August 2014.

The "sixty-miler" MV Stephen Brown was donated by its owners, Coal and Allied, to the Australian Maritime College in Launceston, Tasmania, in April 1983. Most of the older "sixty-milers" had already gone to the breakers yard before then.

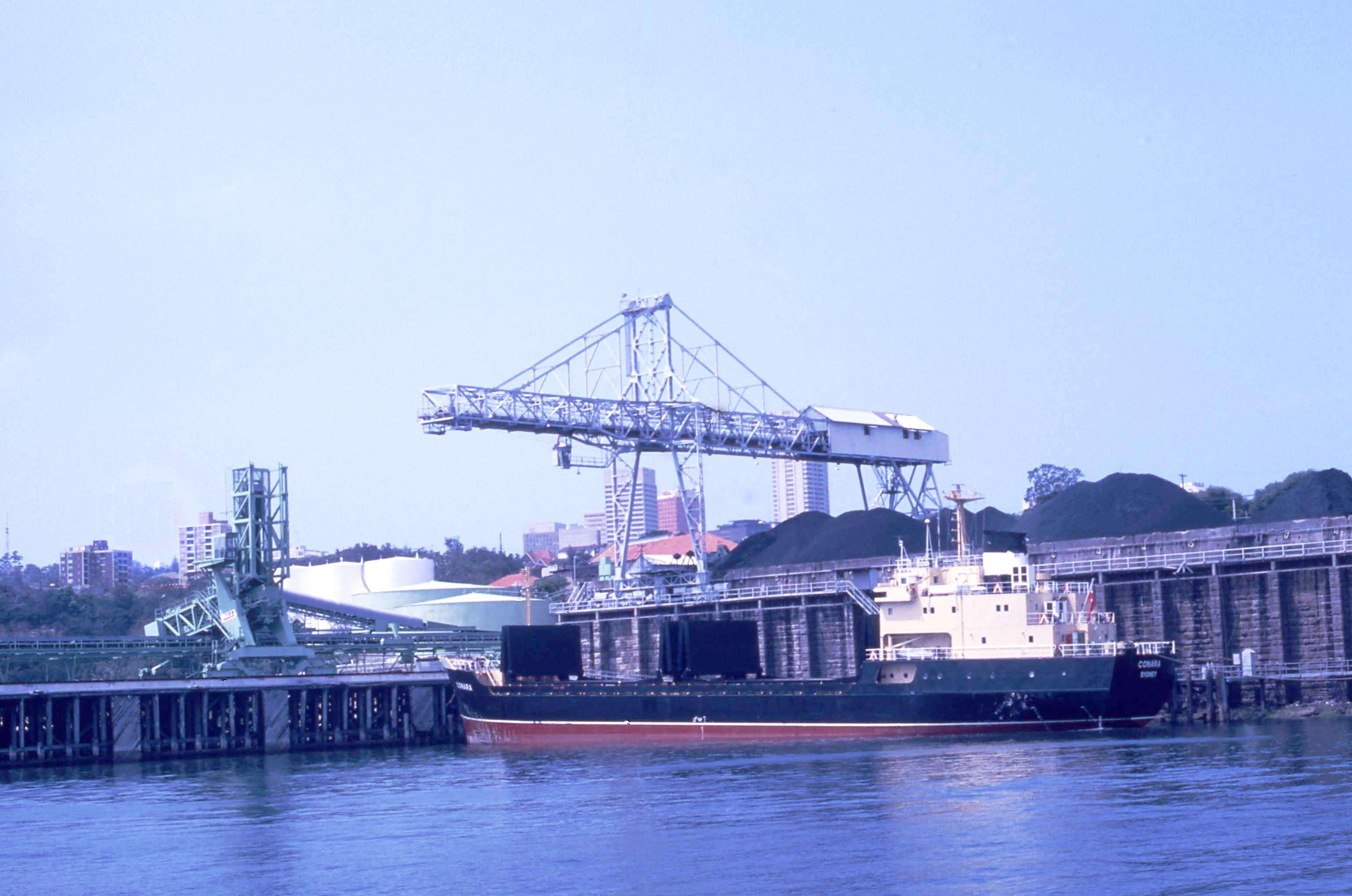
Conara unloading coal at Balls Head, in February 1978. On the left is the modern ship-loader and conveyor belts that replaced the cable and skips, and, in the centre, the renewed gantry grab (unloading) crane. (John Ward, City of Sydney Archives)

Although local demand for coal was falling, demand in the export market increased particularly after the Oil Crises of 1973 and 1979. In 1967, the Ball's Head Coal Loader, reopened as an export trans-shipment terminal. In 1976, the cable loading system was replaced by a system of conveyor belts capable of loading at 1,000 tonnes per hour. A comparison of photographs, from the 1920s, 1960s and late 1970s, shows that the gantry unloading crane was replaced, at some point either in or before 1969.

After 1990, most of the coal moved by the few remaining "sixty-milers" was destined for export. The last "sixty-miler" to carry coal to Sydney—the MV Camira built in 1980—ceased operating the run around 1993, with the final closure of the Ball's Head Coal Loader in that year marking the effective end of the coastal coal-carrying trade to Sydney. The MV Camira was sold in 1993 and converted to a livestock carrier.

During the 1980s, the development of Newcastle as a bulk coal export port resulted in a revival of coastal coal shipping, this time to Newcastle. Purpose-built in 1986, a new self-discharging collier the MV Wallarah—the fourth collier to bear the name and, at 5,717 gross tonnage, far larger than a true 'sixty-miler'—carried coal from Catherine Hill Bay to Newcastle, where it was unloaded for export at the Port Waratah Coal Loader, Carrington. This last echo of the coastal coal-carrying trade ended on 22 July 2002.

== Remnants ==
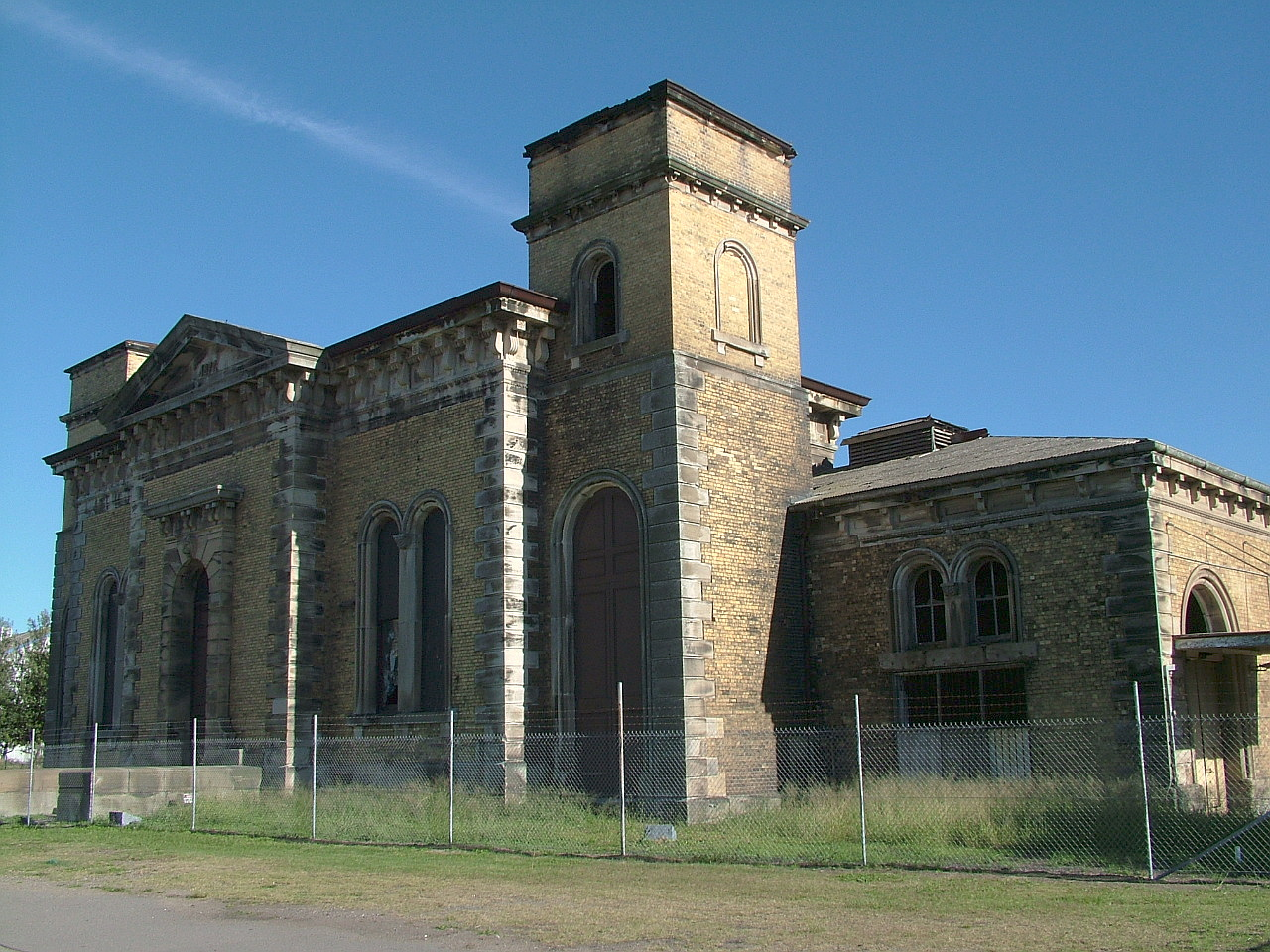
Shell of the Carrington Pumphouse (February 2008)

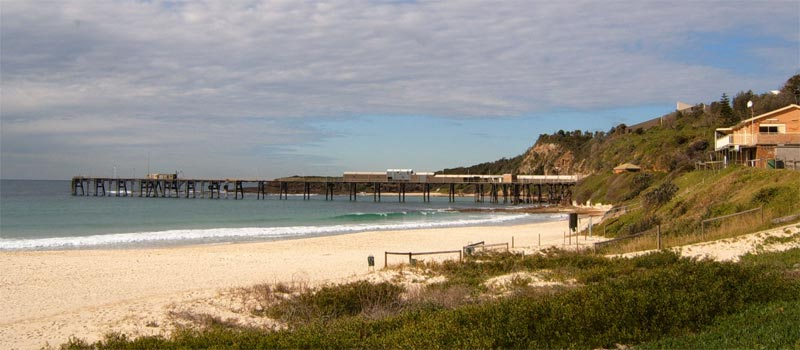
Disused Jetty at Catherine Hill Bay (January 2006). A demolition order was made in September 2025.

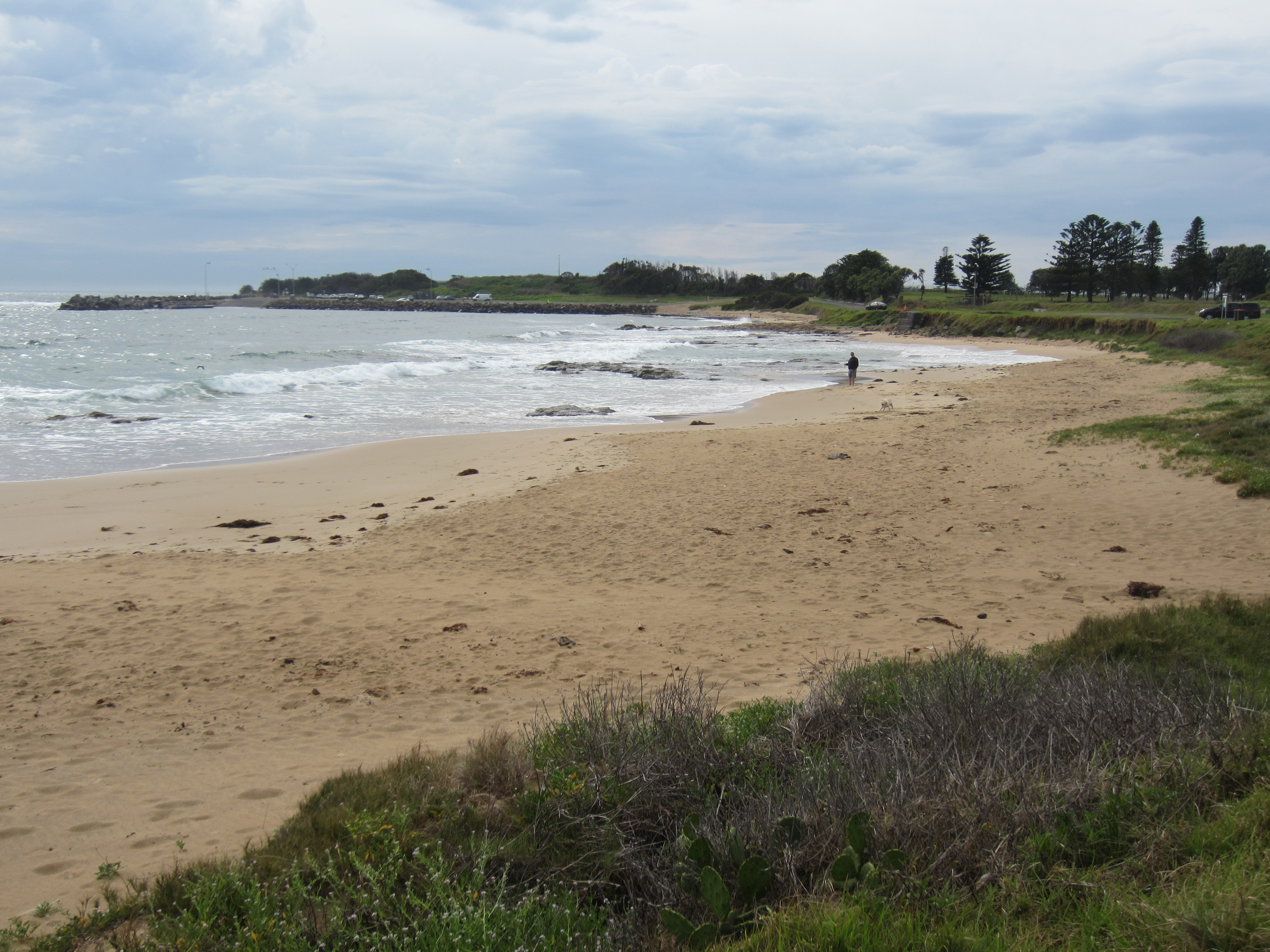
Former Port Bellambi, looking south toward Bellambi Point (Nov. 2020). The dangerous reef is on the southern side of the headland

The Dyke and the Basin are still part of the enlarged Port of Newcastle. The last of the hydraulic cranes at The Basin were demolished in 1967 to make way for a modern export coal-loader but the bases for fixed cranes 7, 8, 9 and 10 survive. The associated Carrington Pump House building still survives in Bourke St Carrington, although its equipment was removed and its chimneys demolished long ago.

Morpeth is now a picturesque riverside town; the decline of the port and other local industries has resulted in the preservation of many of its 19th-Century buildings. The wharves and most of the port's warehouses are gone.

The Outer Harbour at Port Kembla and its breakwaters remain, as a part of an enlarged port that has a major coal export terminal—located on the newer Inner Harbour—but all the old coal jetties are gone.

All the ocean coal jetties are gone, except the disused jetty at Catherine Hill Bay. Also at Catherine Hill Bay is the Catherine Hill Bay Cultural Precinct, although it is now somewhat compromised by approval in 2019 of a housing development on land behind the headland where the jetty is. Bushland in nearby coastal areas is protected as the Wallarah National Park. However, in September 2025, the old jetty was made subject to a demolition order by the NSW Government.

Coalcliff jetty mine site is visible beneath the Sea Cliff Bridge. Iron dowel pins that secured the timber uprights to the bedrock and an iron mooring ring set into in the rock are all that remain of the Hicks Point Jetty at Austinmer.

The last vestiges of the Bulli Jetty were a hazard to surfers and were demolished in 1988. The nearby creek, Tramway Creek, was named for the tramway linking the old Bulli Mine to the jetty. Apart from a few pieces of wharf timber—still there in November 2020, after being exposed by coastal erosion—all that remains of Port Bellambi is wreckage of ships. The boiler of the Munmorah can still be seen on the reef at low tide.

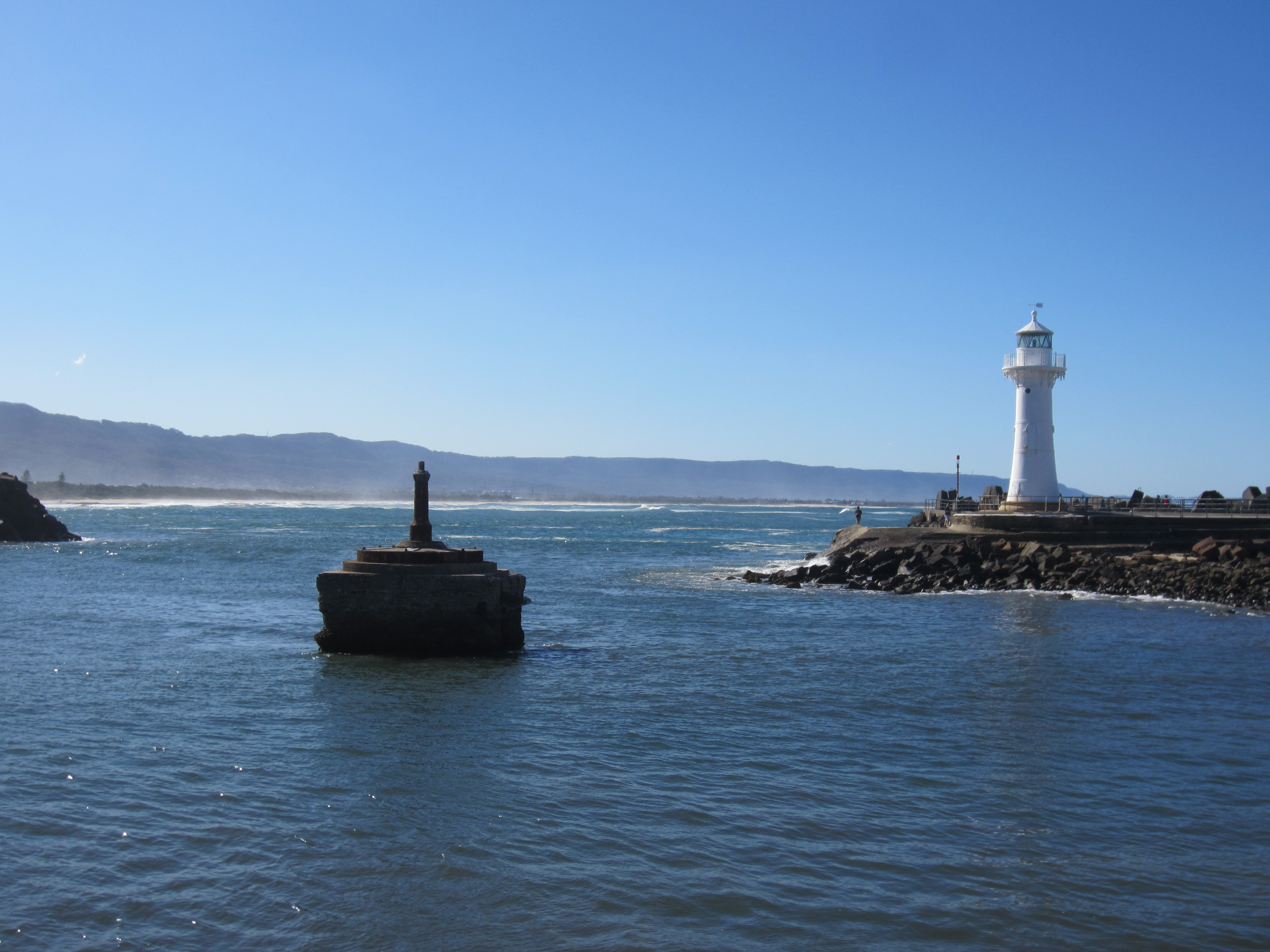
Entrance to Wollongong Harbour and base of the Tee-Wharf steam crane, with the northern portion of the Illawarra escarpment in the background (August 2018)

Wollongong Harbour has been a fishing port, since the Illawarra Steam Navigation Company ended freight services in 1948. Belmore Basin survives including the upper-level where the coal staithes once were located, as does the concrete and iron base for the crane of the former "Tee-Wharf". Two cuttings, at the southern end of North Wollongong Beach, on the Tramway Shared Path, are remnants of the rail line from the Mt Pleasant Colliery that was removed in 1936.

The old bridge over the Hunter River at Hexham opened in 1952 has a lifting span—no longer in use—which allowed the "sixty milers" to access the one coal loader that was upstream of the bridge's location. The Stockton Bridge opened in 1971 has a 30m clearance to allow ships to use the North Channel of the Hunter River that leads to Hexham. The Hexham coal loaders are all gone. The last of the Coal & Allied facilities at Hexham—the Hexham Coal Washery—was demolished in 1989.

Only a small part of the South Maitland Railway remained in use for coal traffic by 2018; the last coal train ran in March 2020 and the last section of its network is now mothballed. A very few of the 13,000 "non-air" coal wagons and some of the steam locomotives of the northern coalfields survive at the Richmond Vale Railway Museum. The museum makes use of a short remaining part of the former Richmond Vale Railway. The NSW Rail Museum has on display two 10-ton "non-air" four-wheel wagons; one J & A Brown wagon from the northern coalfields and one South Bulli wagon from the southern coalfields.

The former site of the coal wharves at Pyrmont on Darling Harbour is now occupied by the Australian National Maritime Museum.

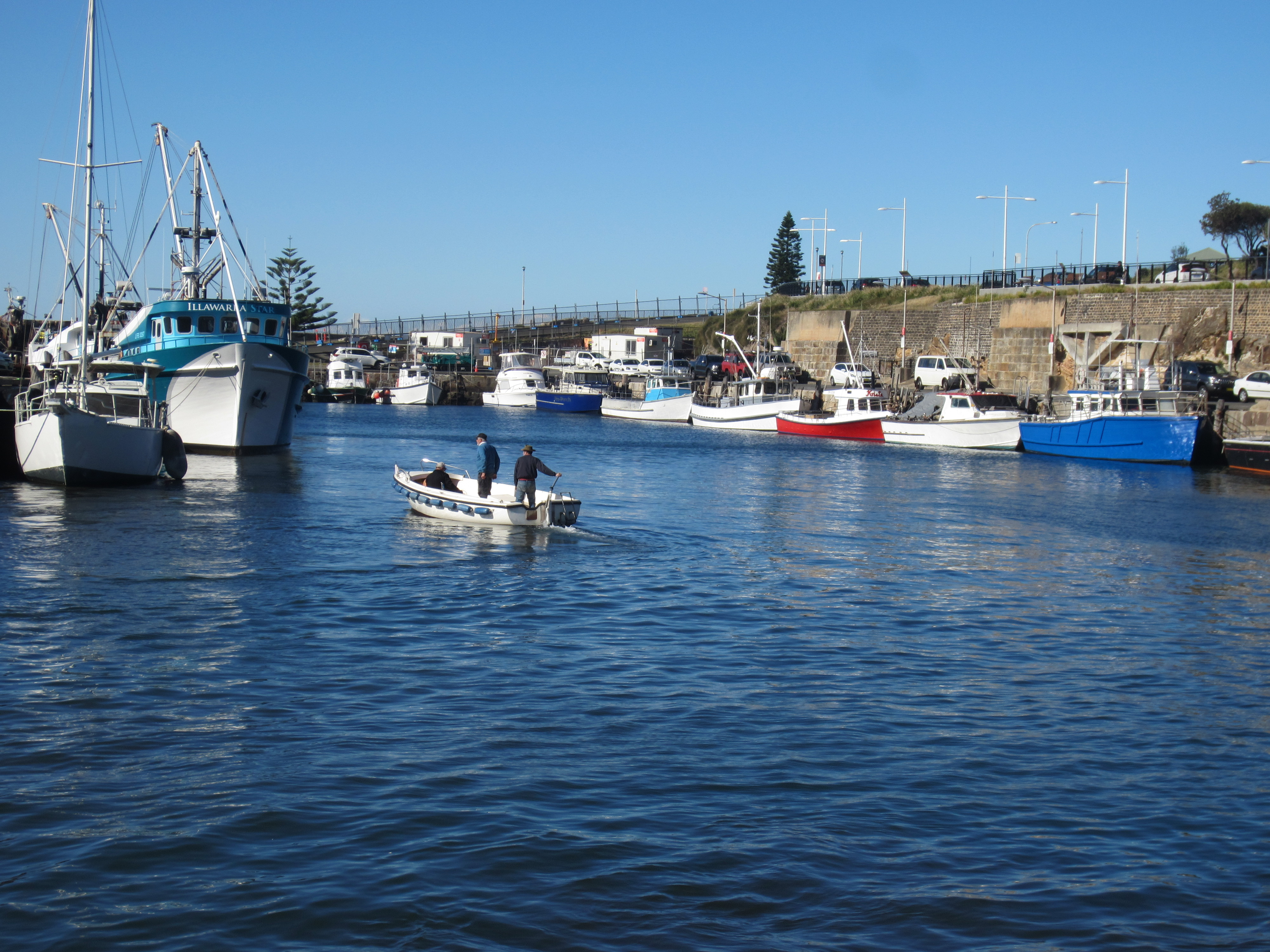
Belmore Basin, Wollongong, with the former locations of two of the coal staiths visible in the stone and concrete wall in the background (August 2018)

The environmental damage that was caused by the construction of the Balls Head Coal Loader at Waverton inspired the writer and poet, Henry Lawson, to write a poem, "The Sacrifice of Balls Head". Parts of the disused loader have been converted to public space—now known as the Coal Loader Centre for Sustainability—with the derelict loading wharf remaining safely off-limits. Ships are still moored at the unloading wharf, but the ships now are ones undergoing restoration. One of the tunnels beneath the stockpile platform still has a movable chute used by the original loading system. The site has interpretive signage that provides information covering in detail the history of the site. In June 2021, the coal loader site was added to the NSW Heritage Register, but, by January 2023, the timber loading wharf was distorted and showing signs of impending collapse.

The Blackwattle Bay coal facility and its gantry crane were largely intact, in 2002, when a master plan for the foreshore area envisaged their retention and adaptive reuse. The gantry crane was demolished at some time before 2007. A partial collapse of the coal bunker occurred as a result of a downpour on 12 February 2007 and some of the damaged structures were demolished in 2007.

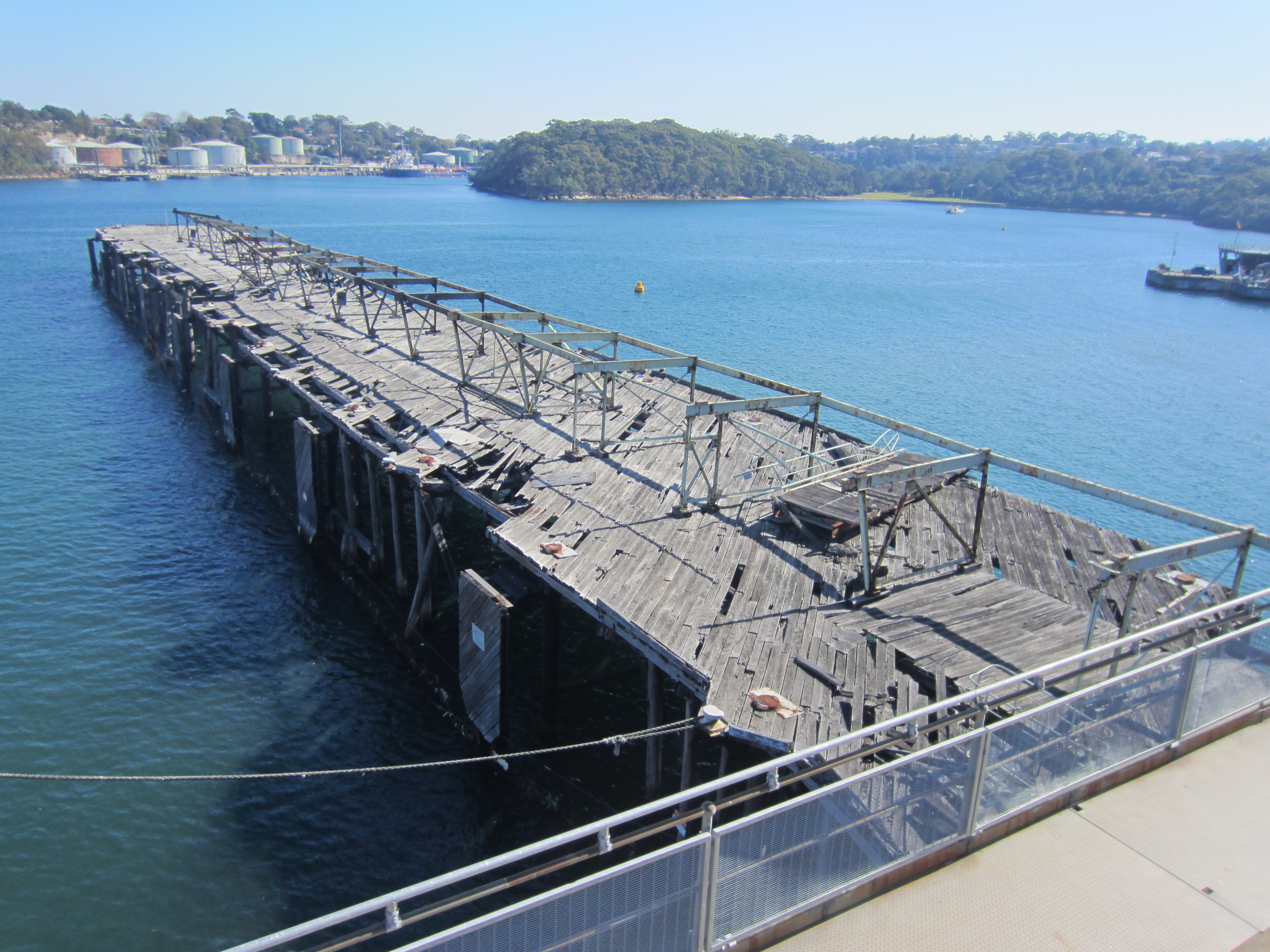
Balls Head Coal Loader at Waverton on Sydney Harbour - Old loading wharf viewed from former stockpile area in August 2018.

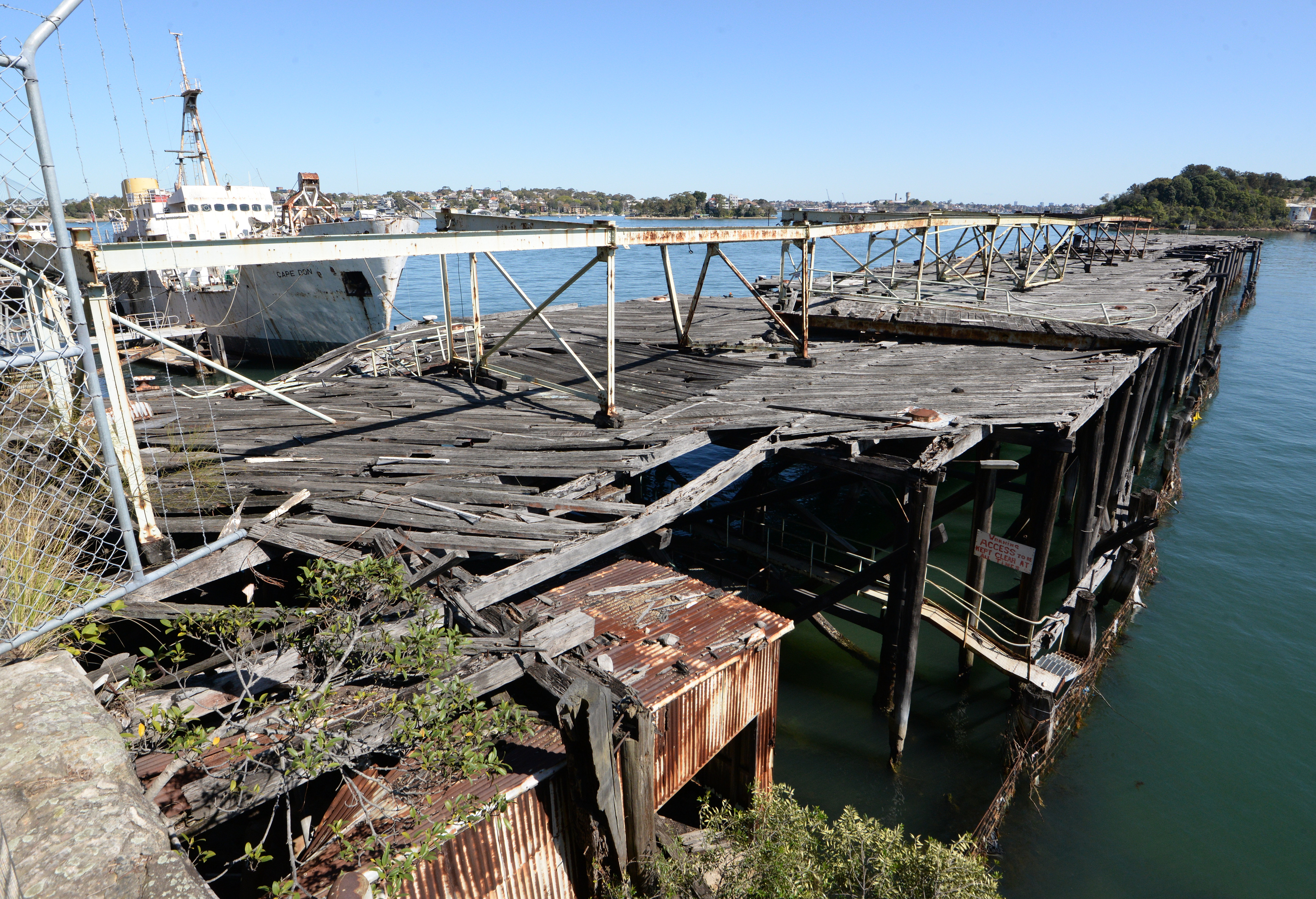
Balls Head Coal Loader, close up view of dilapidated loading wharf in September 2019. By the end of 2020, the decking had largely collapsed, and the steel substructure was virtually all that remained by early 2026,

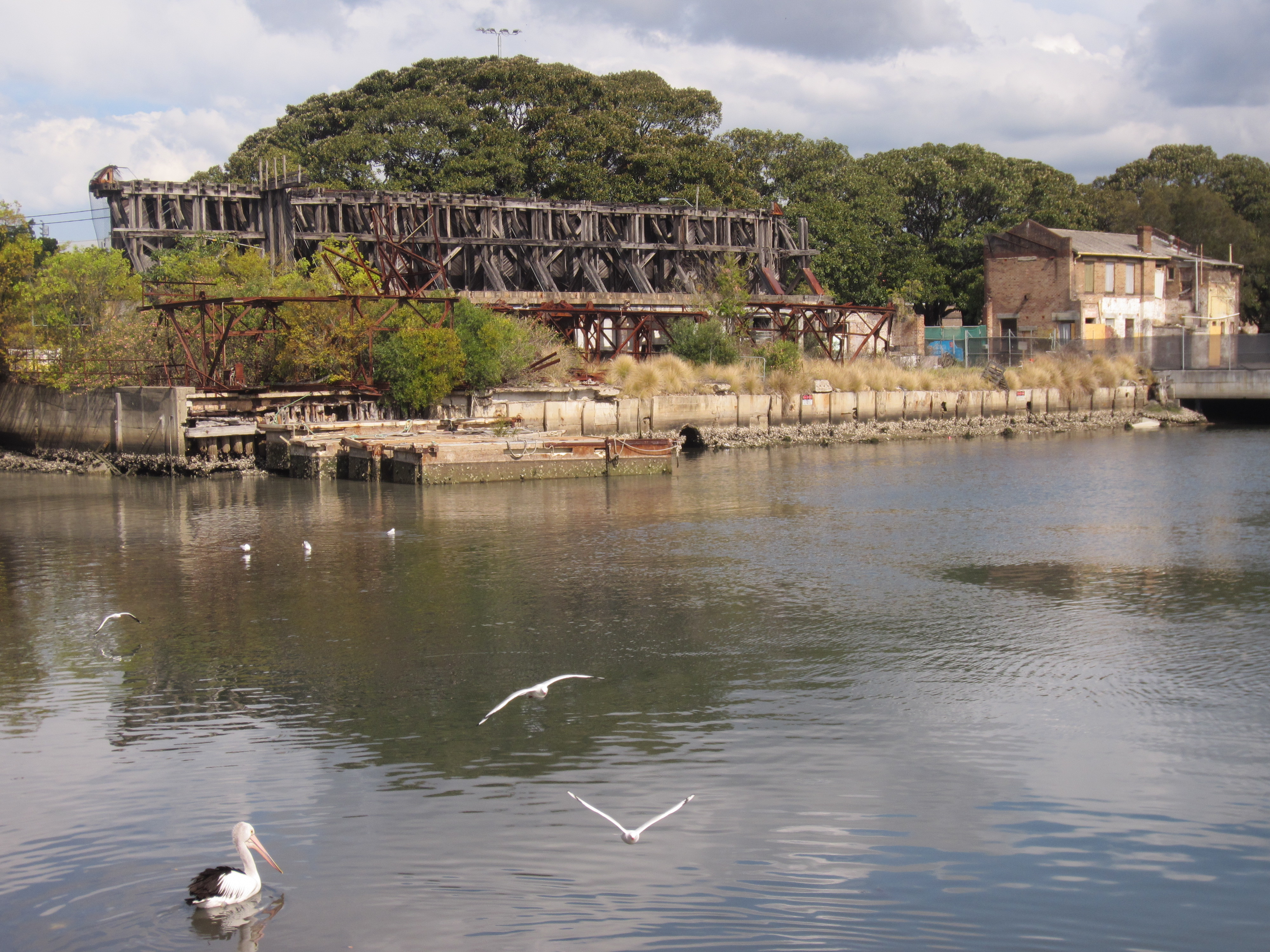
The old coal facility at Blackwattle Bay, Sydney Harbour (originally Jones Brothers Coal Co.), in September 2018. The remnants of the bunker are on the left in the background, the derelict gate-house building is on the right, and a rusting part of the gantry structure is in front of the bunker. It all was gone by early November 2021. The site is now Sydney Fish Market.

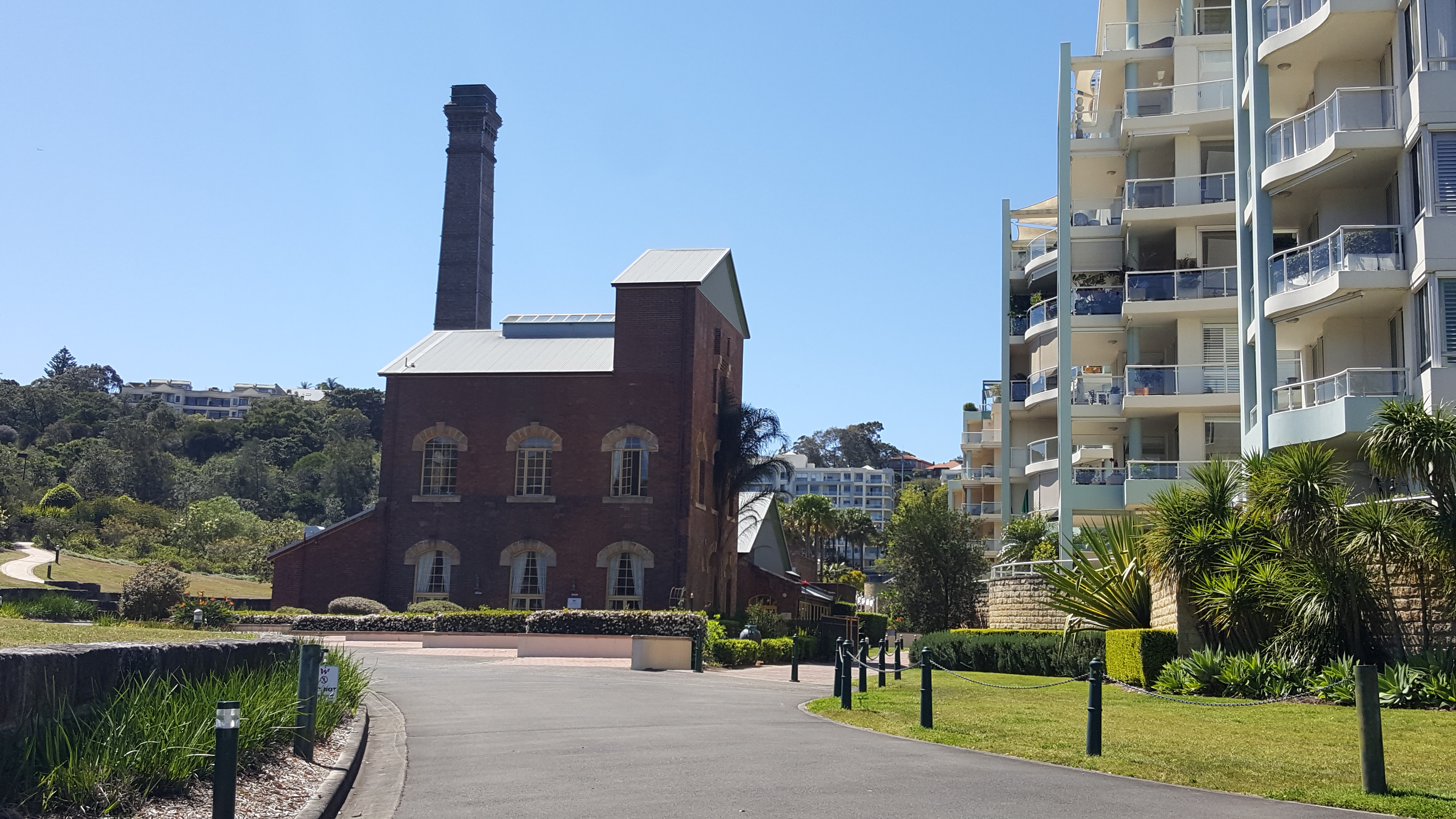
Remaining buildings of the old gasworks at Waverton (October 2018)

By September 2018, only a little of the Blackwattle Bay coal facility survived. The site was derelict and overgrown. There was a derelict brick building—the former gate-house—and one side of the coal bunker structure. The timber wharf had gone although the reclaimed land where the rest of the bunker stood remained. There were rusted remains of some coal handling equipment, including grabs and pieces of gantry crane structure. The NSW Government announced in 2016 that the Sydney Fish Markets would be relocated to the old wharf area adjoining Pyrmont Bridge Rd. That would allow the existing Fish Market site— in the shadow of the Anzac Bridge—to be redeveloped as apartment buildings. Under the plans for the site, the remainder of the old coal facility was to be demolished to make way for the new Fish Market complex. Its site had been cleared by November 2021. By early 2023, construction on the site was well under way, and the new Fish Market opened in January 2026.

The site of the old Manly Gasworks stood idle for over 20 years but, after extensive decontamination work, is now a public park, Little Manly Point Park. The North Shore Gas Company site at Waverton is now mixed use, with some public open space and lots of apartment buildings; there are a few repurposed buildings from the old gasworks remaining (the Boiler House, the Exhauster House, the Carburetted Water Gas Plant and the chimney). The Mortlake Gasworks site is now given over to housing and is known as Breakfast Point. The Gladesville Bridge, opened in 1964, was designed as a high concrete arch to allow "sixty-milers" to reach Mortlake; it replaced an earlier bridge with an opening span.

The old Neutral Bay Gasworks site was used as a torpedo factory during WWII and later as a submarine base for many years, and is now in the process of being repurposed; the first stage of "Sub Base Platypus" opened in May 2018. A short laneway in Millers Point—Gas Lane—is a reminder of the Miller's Point gasworks, the first in Australia, and a building that was previously a part of its carburetted water gas plant remains. The Gasworks Bridge at Parramatta is a reminder that there once was a gasworks there. The site of the old Parramatta gasworks is now Queens Wharf Reserve and the stone retaining wall on the riverbank is a remnant of the old gasworks.

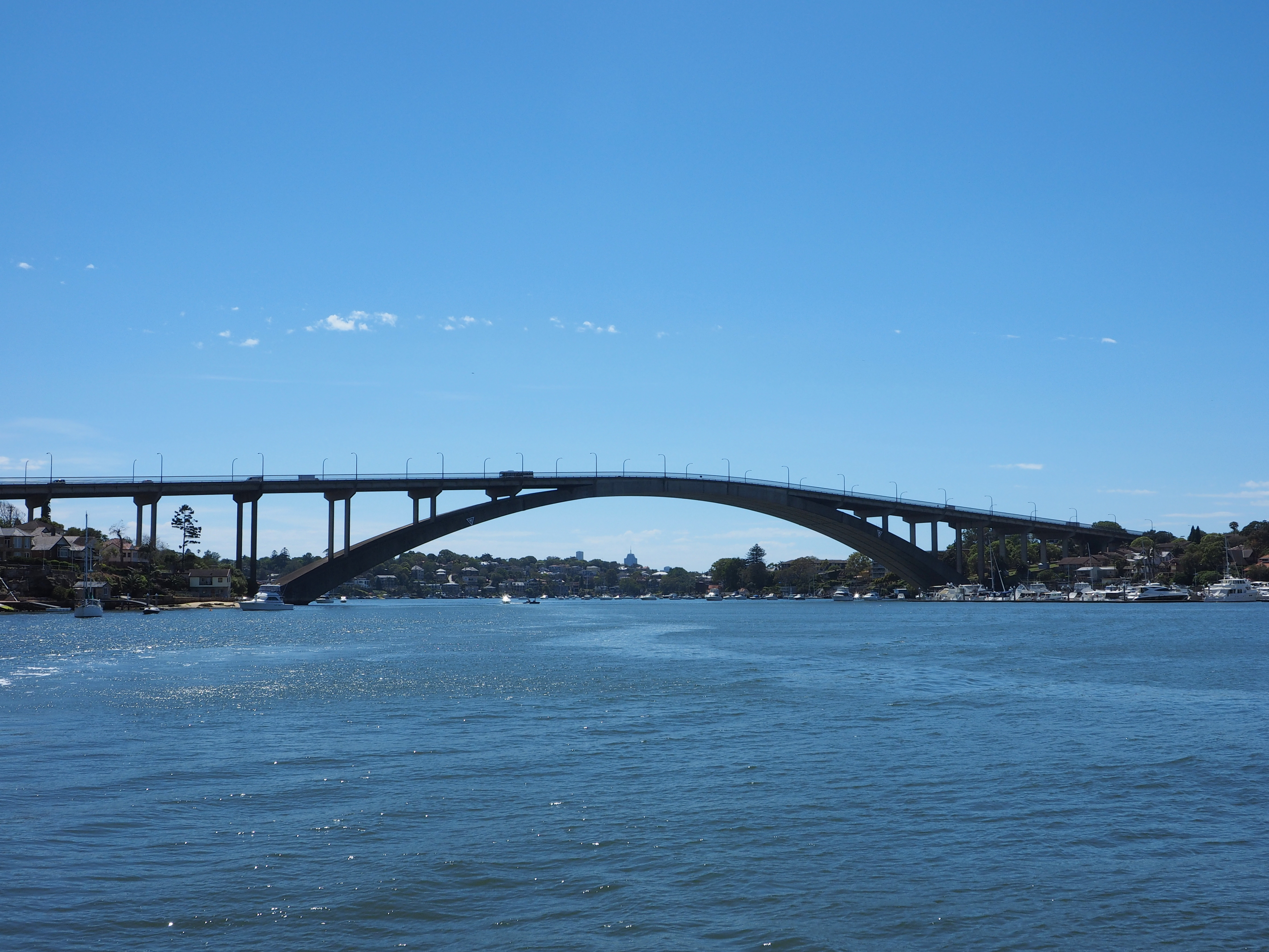
Gladesville Bridge (completed in 1964). Its high clearance was needed to allow "sixty-milers" to reach the AGL Mortlake Gasworks.

All the foreshore industries that used coal and their coal wharves are gone, making way for residential development or repurposing. One coal bunker, the powerhouse building and its chimney remain standing on Cockatoo Island.

Some piers of the old Government Pier at Botany on the northern shore of Botany Bay were still standing in 2002. The area is now part of Port Botany, which has supplanted Sydney Harbour as the main cargo port of Sydney. The Alexandra Canal ceased to be used by ships in the 1940s; its wharves are gone, and the two lifting bridges across it have been replaced by modern bridges with fixed spans. The sediments of the canal are heavily contaminated by the area's former industries, making it difficult to repurpose the canal and to redevelop the surrounding land.

There is one remaining "sixty-miler" afloat in Australia, the MV Stephen Brown, although no longer in use as a collier. She is used as a stationary training vessel by the Australian Maritime College. Wrecks of other "sixty-milers" exist at Homebush Bay in Sydney, at Cape Banks the north headland of Botany Bay, and on the sea bed near Sydney. The mechanised coal hulk, Muscoota, lies far from Sydney Harbour, at Discovery Bay (Waga Waga), Papua New Guinea. She still carries her last cargo of coal, but is now partially coated in coral growths—the tip of her bow above the waterline and her rudder 24 metres below—reportedly making a perfect snorkeling and dive site.

== See also ==
- Sixty-miler
- List of foreshore industrial sites on Sydney Harbour
- Stone Fleet (New South Wales)
- Illawarra Harbour port scheme

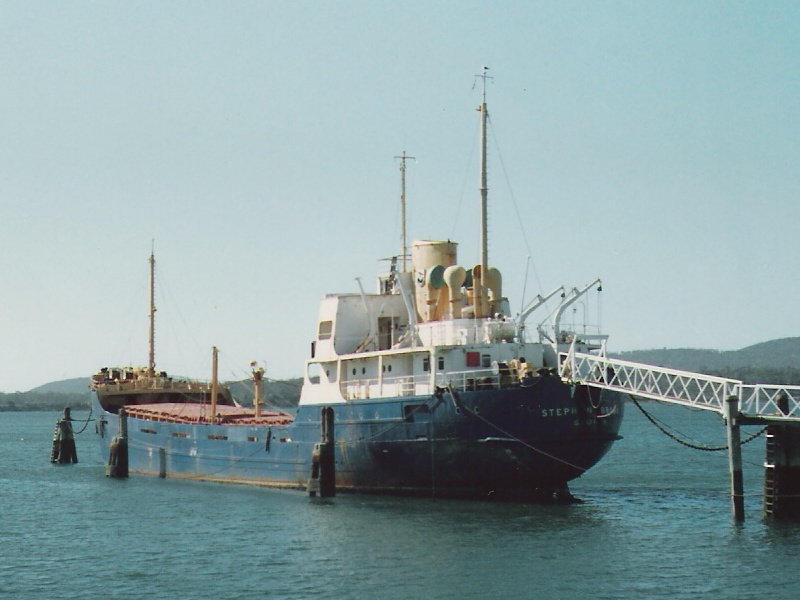
MV Stephen Brown – the last 'sixty-miler' in Australia that is still afloat, in a photograph taken in 1987.
