= Glenrock Lagoon =

Coastal waterway in New South Wales, Australia

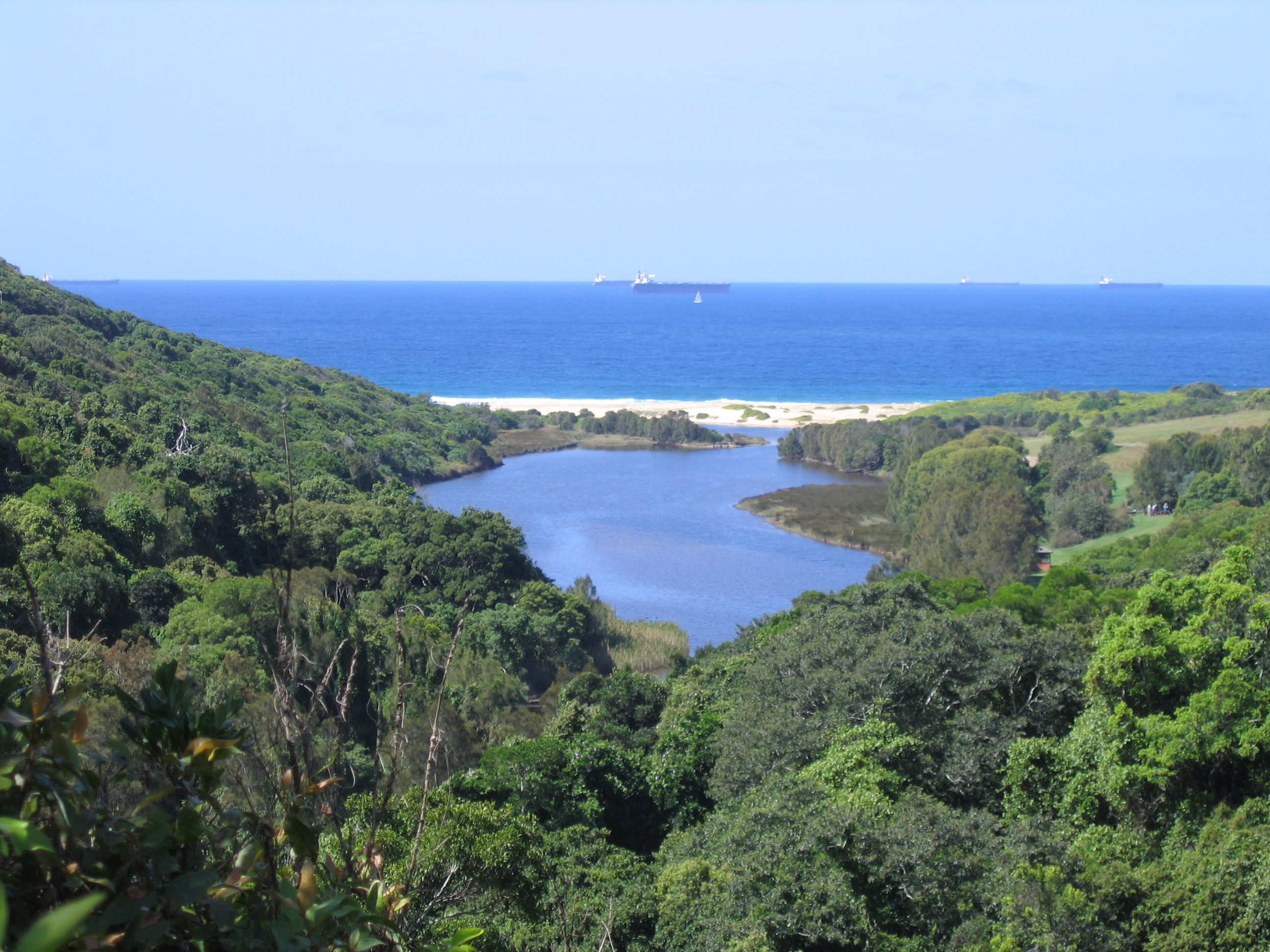
- Looking east across Glenrock Lagoon from Leichhardt's Lookout on the Yuelarbah Track

- Location within New South Wales Location within Australia
- Location: Newcastle–Hunter, New South Wales, Australia
- Coordinates: 32°58′S 151°44′E
- Lake type: Intermediate fresh water small coastal creek
- Primary inflows: Flaggy Creek
- Primary outflows: Tasman Sea, South Pacific Ocean
- Catchment area: 7.4 square kilometres (2.9 sq mi)
- Basin countries: Australia
- Surface area: 0.1 square kilometres (0.039 sq mi)
- Average depth: 0.3 metres (1 ft 0 in)
- Water volume: 15.1 megalitres (530×10^{3} cu ft)
- Surface elevation: 0 m (0 ft)
- Settlements: Adamstown, Dudley
- Website: NSW Environment & Heritage webpage

Glenrock Lagoon, an intermediate fresh water small coastal creek, is located within the Lake Macquarie local government area in the Newcastle and Hunter regions of New South Wales, Australia. The lake is located near the Newcastle suburbs of Adamstown and Dudley and is situated about 153 kilometres (95 mi) north of Sydney.

== Features and location ==
Drawing its catchment from Flaggy Creek within the Glenrock State Recreation Area and the Awabakal Nature Reserve, the small lagoon is quite shallow with an average depth of 2.4 metres (7 ft 10 in). It is connected with the Tasman Sea through a tidal channel. Glenrock Lagoon has a catchment area of 7.4 square kilometres (2.9 sq mi) and a surface area of 0.1 square kilometres (0.039 sq mi). The boundary of the lagoon is approximately 11 km (7 mi), with a length (east to west) of 4.1 km (2.5 mi) and width varying from 0.6 km (0.4 mi) at the coast to 0.35 km (0.2 mi) in the centre.

There are three sub-catchments areas, Little Flaggy Creek in the north, Flaggy Creek in the centre and a small unnamed creek in the southeast. Two of the main tributaries are, Flaggy Creek (approx 4 km (2 mi) in length) and Little Flaggy Creek (also shown on some maps as Glenrock Creek). On a map of the parish of Kahibah dated 1887, Little Flaggy Creek was named "First Flaggy Creek" and Flaggy Creek was known as "Second Flaggy Creek".

The catchment has mainly clay soils. Dry and swamp sclerophyll forest and rainforest vegetation exists in the bush areas.

== History ==
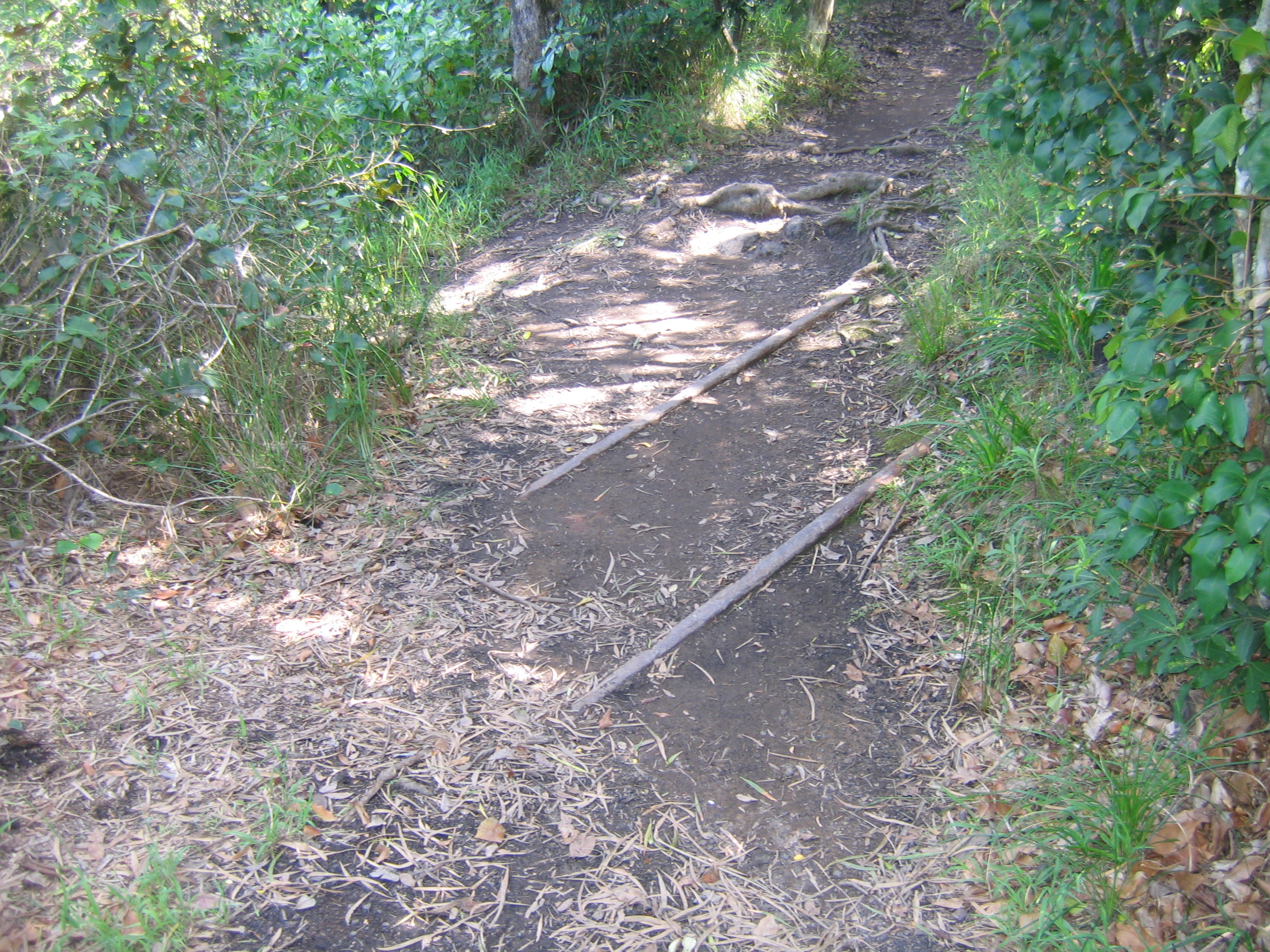
Remnants of an old coal railway line

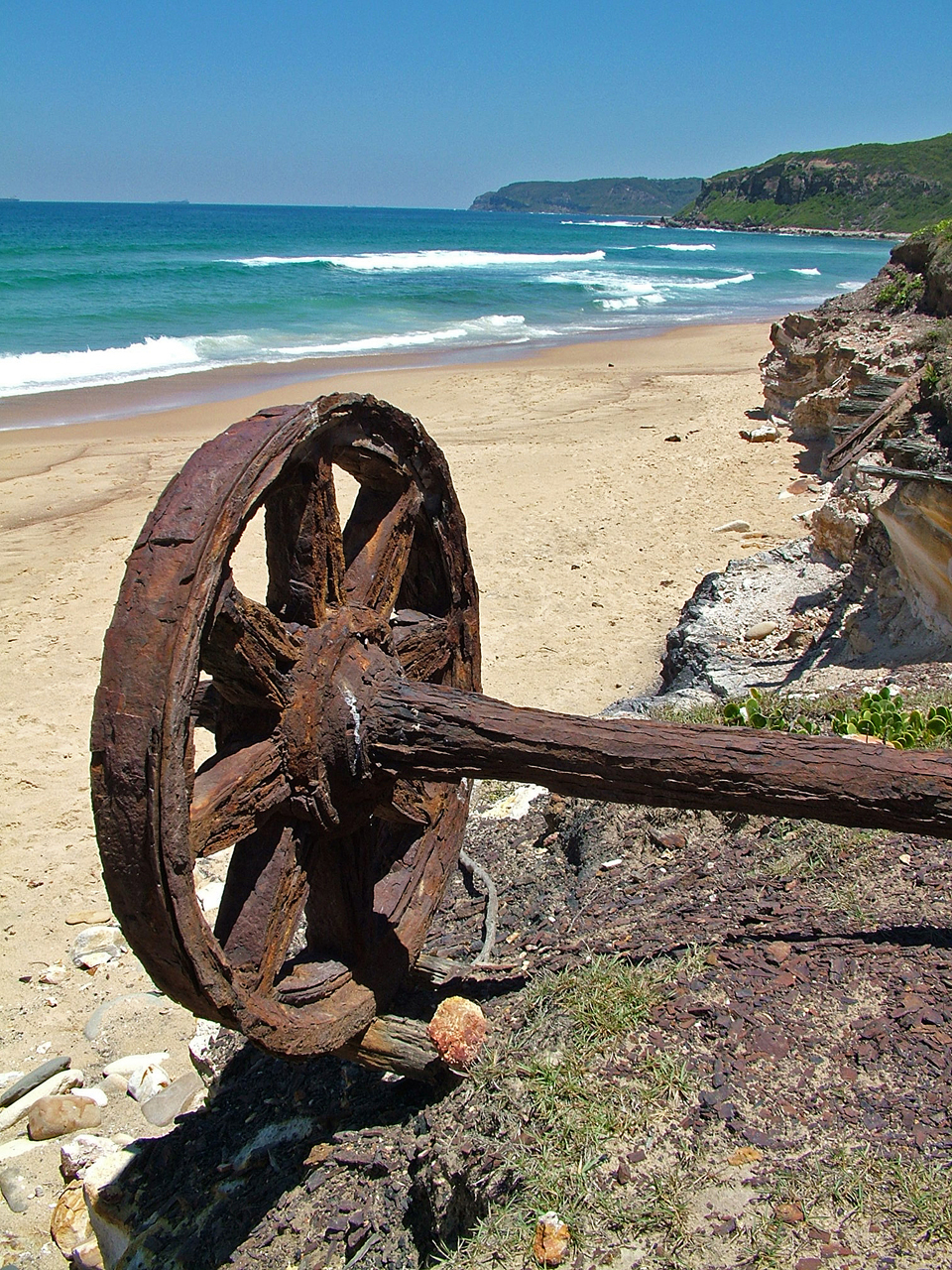
Rusty coal carriage wheels located on Burwood Beach

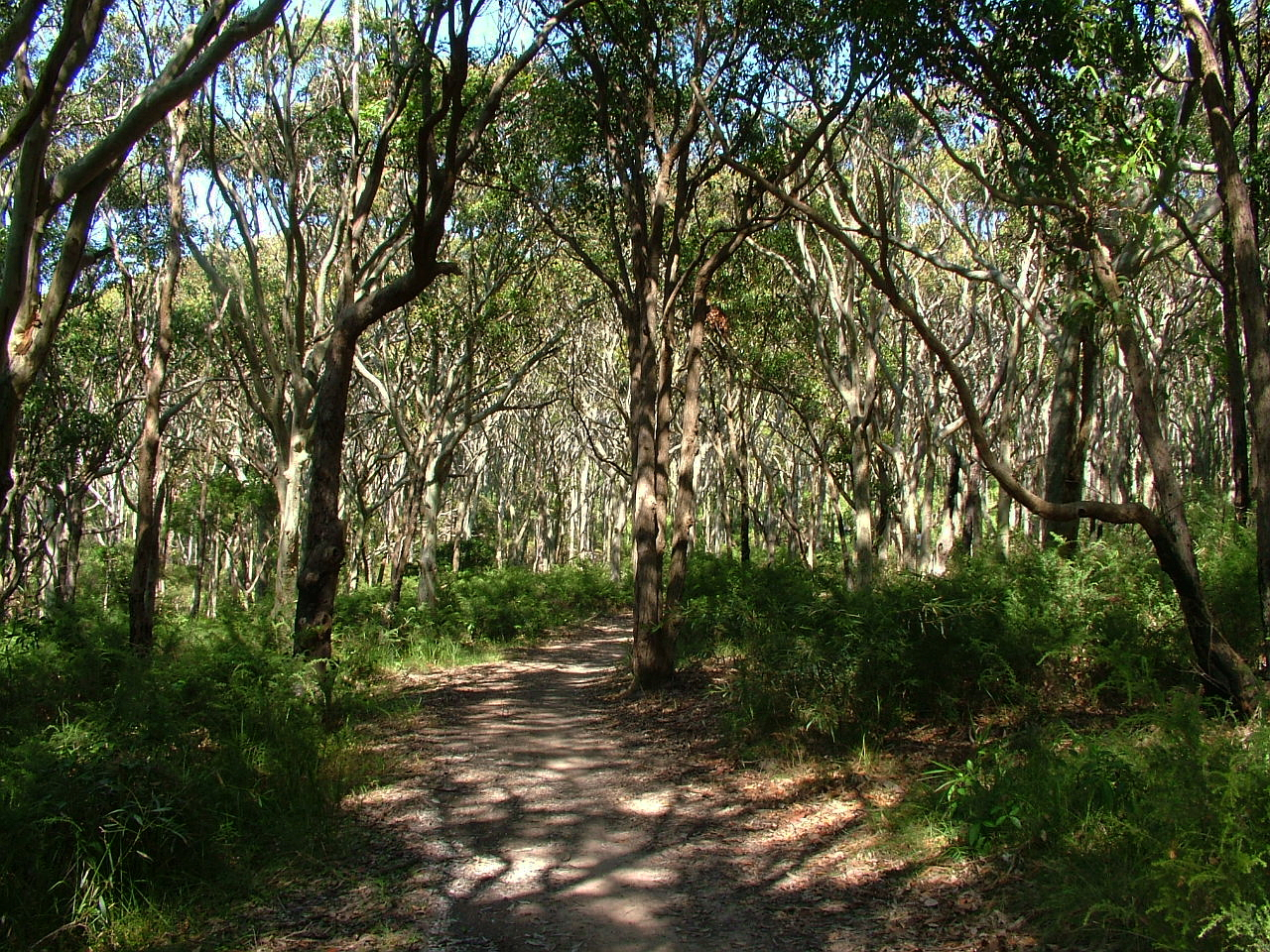
A pocket of open forest in Glenrock

Glenrock Lagoon came into existence 6,000 years ago when the sea level stabilised after the last ice age. The lagoon is a small body of water approx 900 metres (3,000 ft) long and approx 100 m (330 ft) wide and covers an area of approx 8 hectares (20 acres). This area does vary depending upon the water level. The water levels can vary as much as 2 m (7 ft).

While the early European pioneers named it "Glenrock" because of the rugged nature of the glen, the area of Glenrock Lagoon was originally called Pillapay-Kullaitaran, meaning "The Valley of the Palms", because cabbage palm was common to the area. The Awabakal people are said to be the Aboriginal tribe who were found in this area. Archaeological evidence has been found to date a campsite at Swansea Heads, some miles to the south of Glenrock, at 7,800 years. The remains of a tool making site mark the location of communal gatherings at the lagoon.

The first coal discovered in Australia was by the escaped convicts William and Mary Bryant on their journey to Timor. They were the first Europeans to set foot in the area, discovering coal near the entrance to Glenrock Lagoon on 30 March 1791. They named it Fortunate Creek because they found food there and friendly Aboriginal people. However, the news did not get back to Sydney and it was Lieutenant John Shortland who received credit for the discovery of coal in Newcastle on 9 September 1797. Even today, coal can still be found in the cliff face on the northern headland at the mouth of Glenrock Lagoon.

In a letter dated 12 October 1842, to W. Kirchner of Sydney, Friedrich Wilhelm Ludwig Leichhardt describes a walk through the valley on his way from Newcastle to Redhead via Charlestown. On this walk he described the view of the lagoon from a high vantage point. That vantage point is today known as "Leichhardt Lookout", which is on the Great North Walk.

You'll have heard of the Valley of Palms. It happens that there are very few palms there, which makes it by so much the richer in other kinds of plants. It's a narrow, rocky gully with steep sides which widens out towards the sea. The slopes are covered with the most luxurious vegetation, trees and bushes are bound together by climbers, and the trunks of the trees are covered with parasitic plants. Floods, that have swept down with irresistible power during the heavy winter rains, have uprooted big trees, and have produced the wildest conflagration of closely entangled life and death.

In 1883 the Burwood Coal Mining Company was formed, but it was December 1884 before a shaft was sunk, completed on 10 May 1885, which was named Burwood Colliery. A private railway was built from the mine across the lagoon around the cliff face and across Burwood Beach (then known as Smelters Beach) to connect with the Merewether Estate line where the former smelter was situated and some coal loading already took place.

Flaggy Creek had been surveyed by 1828 by Henry Dangar, a land owner from Newcastle, but was unnamed. A map of this survey shows the main road south through the area that was later called Charlestown, the Burwood Road ridge line called "Wahrah", and the unnamed Flaggy Creek. During the latter half of the 20th century, this creek was unofficially referred to by local families as Rocky Creek and provided a well watered bushland setting for the children of Kahibah to play.

== Development ==
Besides the major road corridors, there is a major walking trail, the Great North Walk (Yuelarbah Track) and The Fernleigh Track cycleway. The Great North Walk follows Flaggy Creek from Charlestown to the top of the lagoon. Then follows the northern shore of the lagoon to the beach before heading north to Newcastle along the Burwood beach past Murdering Gully and the ruins of the copper smelter.

The old rail corridor to Belmont has been upgraded to a cycle way and was completed in 2015. It was completed in three stages: Park Avenue (Adamstown) to Kahibah Station, Burwood Road (Kahibah) by 2004; Kahibah Station, Burwood Road (Kahibah) to Oakdale Road (Redhead) by 2009; and Oakdale Road (Redhead) to Belmont 2015.

Glenrock Lagoon has been for over a century a recreational area for the people of Newcastle and Lake Macquarie. Glenrock State Conservation Area was declared a protected area in 1986.

Within the catchment are the following suburbs – Adamstown Heights, Merewether Heights, Highfields, Kahibah, Charlestown, Whitebridge. However, Kahibah is the only suburb that is totally within the catchment area.

== See also ==
- List of lakes of Australia
