= Kahibah =

Kahibah Greater Newcastle, New South Wales
- Coordinates: 32.967°S 151.717°E
- Population: 2,603 (2021 census)
  - Density: 2,000/km^{2} (5,190/sq mi)
- Established: 1868
- Postcode(s): 2290
- Area: 1.3 km^{2} (0.5 sq mi)
- Location: 9 km (6 mi) WSW of Newcastle; 2 km (1 mi) ENE of Charlestown
- LGA(s): City of Lake Macquarie
- Parish: Kahibah
- State electorate(s): Charlestown
- Federal division(s): Shortland
Suburbs around Kahibah:
Adamstown Heights	Highfields	Highfields
Charlestown	Kahibah	Whitebridge
Charlestown	Charlestown	Whitebridge

Kahibah is a suburb of the City of Lake Macquarie, Greater Newcastle in New South Wales, Australia, located 9 kilometres (6 mi) from Newcastle's central business district.

== History ==
Kahibah is the closest suburb to Glenrock Lagoon, and is drained by Flaggy and Little Flaggy creeks which flow into Glenrock Lagoon 2 km to the east. The suburb's name is from the Aboriginal name word "Ky-yee-bah", which meant either a place for games or to be active and eager. The local Aboriginal people, the Awabakal people, had camps in the area of Glenrock Lagoon, and named the area "Pillapay-Kullaitaran", meaning "Valley of the palms".

In a letter dated 12 October 1842, to W. Kirchner of Sydney, Friedrich Wilhelm Ludwig Leichhardt describes a walk through the valley on his way from Newcastle to Redhead via Charlestown. On this walk he described the view of the lagoon from a high vantage point. That vantage point is today known as "Leichhardt Lookout", which is on the Great North Walk.

The township of Kahibah was gazetted on 27 February 1894. This township is not to be confused with a proposed village "Kahibah" approved by the Surveyor-General Office in 1865 which was to be located on the northern side of the entrance of Lake Macquarie where the suburbs of Pelican and Blacksmiths now exist.

In 1880 a coal rail line was built to Redhead with the line being extended to Belmont in 1916. A station was built at Kahibah. On 8 April 1971 at 1710 the last rail passenger train to Belmont via Kahibah left Newcastle Station with the rail line closing to all coal traffic on 21 December 1992. Since then the line has been redeveloped to a cycleway called "The Fernleigh Track". The first section from Adamstown to Kahibah was opened on 2 February 2003. The second stage, Kahibah to Whitebridge was opened on 7 May 2005.

On 21 October 1922 the Memorial Hall was opened in Hexham Street. It has also been known as the "Soldiers' Memorial Hall". Within the hall were two honour rolls of men and women that went to World War I and World War 2. These honour rolls now reside in the Kahibah Public School Memorial Hall. Over the life of the hall it served as a school, picture theatre, library, play group (last meeting December 1995). The hall was demolished in 1996 to make way for home units.

In 1938 a school was established, in the Memorial Hall but it was not until 20 October 1954 that Kahibah Public School was moved to its current location.

The Great North Walk passes Kahibah on its way from Newcastle to Sydney. Each section of the track is named. The first 25 km of the walk from Newcastle to Teralba, Lake Macquarie is known as the Yuelarbah Track.

== Indigenous affairs ==
The Aboriginal people, in this area, the Awabakal, were the first people of this land.
