= Macquarie Place Park =

Heritage-listed park in Sydney, Australia

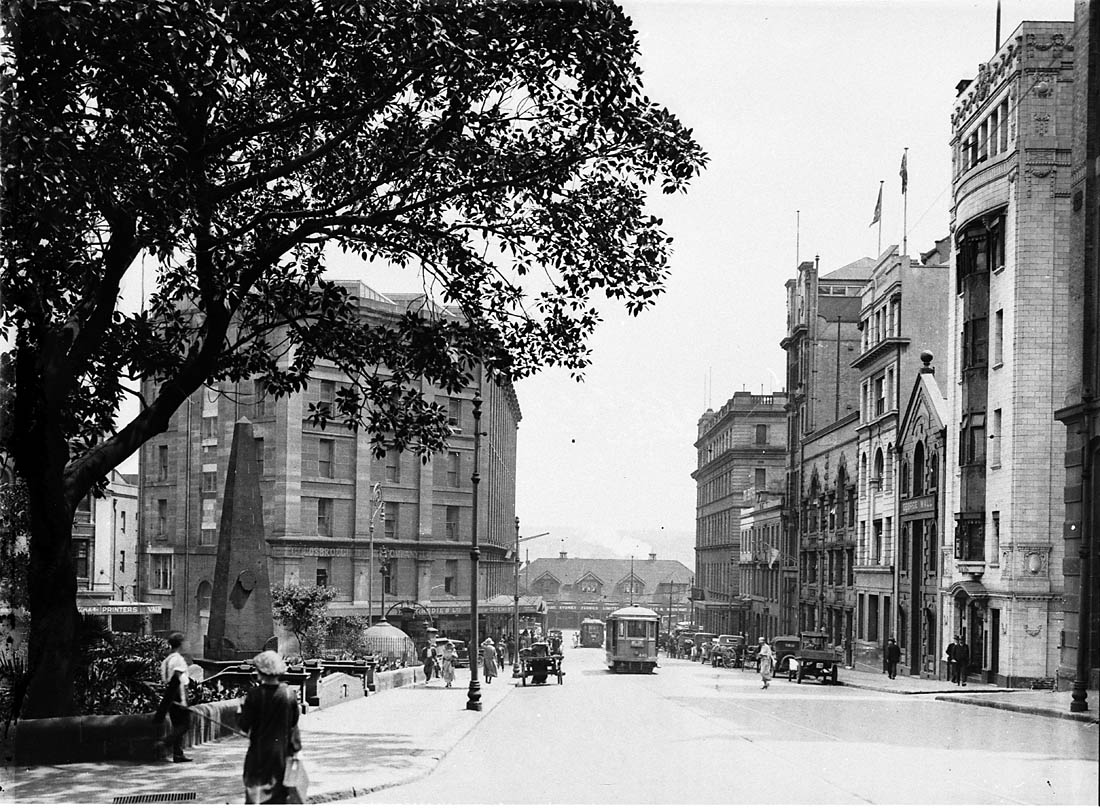
- Macquarie Place in the 1920s.

- Location within Sydney
- Location: Macquarie Place, Sydney central business district, Sydney, New South Wales, Australia
- Coordinates: 33°51′48″S 151°12′36″E
- Created: October 1810
- Operator: City of Sydney
- Open: 24 hours
- Status: Open all year
- Public transit: Circular Quay

History
- Built: 1810–1818

New South Wales Heritage Register
- Official name: Macquarie Place Precinct; The Obelisk; Macquarie Obelisk; Sirius anchor and gun/ canon; Statue of T. S. Mort; Underground Public Conveniences; Christie Wright Memorial Fountain
- Type: State heritage (landscape)
- Designated: 5 March 2010
- Reference no.: 1759
- Type: Urban Park
- Category: Parks, Gardens and Trees
- Builders: Edward Cureton (obelisk)

The Macquarie Place Park, also known as the Macquarie Place Precinct, is a heritage-listed small triangular urban park located in the Sydney central business district in the City of Sydney local government area of New South Wales, Australia. The former town square and milestone and now memorial, public park and monument is situated on the corner of Bridge Street and Loftus Street. It is named in honour of Governor Lachlan Macquarie. The precinct includes The Obelisk or Macquarie Obelisk, the Sirius anchor and gun/cannon, the Statue of Thomas Sutcliffe Mort, the historic Underground Public Conveniences and the Christie Wright Memorial Fountain. The property was added to the New South Wales State Heritage Register on 5 March 2010.

Macquarie Place was the first formally laid out public space in Sydney in 1810, functioning as the town square. Along with Hyde Park, it is the oldest public park in Australia. Its size has been greatly reduced since colonial days. An obelisk from 1818 and designed by the New South Wales Government Architect, Francis Greenway, is located in the park and records the distance to various locations in New South Wales along the earliest roads developed in the colony. Later an anchor from the Norfolk Island wreckage of the First Fleet flagship, HMS Sirius, together with a cannon from the ship, were placed in the park. The Great North Walk to Newcastle southern terminus is at the obelisk in Macquarie Place.

Many important institutions have had establishments at Macquarie Place. In 1817 Australia's first bank, the Bank of New South Wales opened in Macquarie Place. The State Library of New South Wales briefly had premises in the place during the 1830s. Opposite the place in Bridge Street is the original Department of Lands building, which was the department responsible for surveying and mapping New South Wales.

In 1883, a statue of early Australian industrialist Thomas Mort was unveiled in the park. In 1954, Queen Elizabeth II and the Duke of Edinburgh marked the beginning of the Remembrance Driveway by planting two plane trees in Macquarie Place.

== History ==
Originally swampy mangrove land on the banks of the Tank Stream, the colony's first water supply, this site is very significant. In 1792 a path continuing Bridge Street and the carriageway to First Government House met in this approximate spot. This was then close to the foreshore. By then the alignment of lots forming its southern boundary was in existence.

Macquarie Place is shown from 1792 as a triangular area adjoining the garden of the First Government House, near the original foreshore of Circular Quay (then Sydney Cove) and on the eastern bank of the Tank Stream (when it was an open stream into Sydney Cove). The land of Macquarie Place is represented as such in the 1792 Governor Phillip's Survey of the settlement in New South Wales and the 1793 Sketch of Sydney by Ferdinand Brambila. The triangular shape responded to the natural topography of the original shoreline of Sydney Cove and the Tank Stream. The triangular area was formed by the intersection of three early Colonial roads running in direct lines between three important constructions of the colonial period, including the Guard House at the entrance to First Government House at the south-eastern tip of the triangle, the bridge over the Tank Stream at the south-western tip of the triangle, and the 1788 fortifications (replaced by the Dry Store in 1791) beside the Government Wharf at the northern tip of the triangle. Macquarie Place may have operated as a public place of gathering for the early settlement from as early as 1791 alongside the Dry Store, located in the approximate present-day location of Customs House. At least half of the population still depended upon this Dry Store for collecting their food rations by 1801. During this early period before the official gazettal of Macquarie Place, part of the land was leased to Shadrach Shaw. This early lease appears in plans of Sydney of 1800 and 1807 and in no other known plans before or following these years.

By 1807 a triangular layout had been formalised (relating to the existing layout of plots) and a guard house had been built next to Government House's main entrance.

=== Macquarie's plan for Sydney town ===
In 1810 Macquarie named the principal roads in Sydney town, envisaging a regular grid, and set aside Macquarie Place as public ground. Roads to Liverpool and Windsor were completed and toll gates built. During his term (1810–1821) a network of surveyed new towns (the five Hawkesbury towns, Liverpool, Campbelltown) and roads pushed into the interior, well past the 64 kilometres (40 mi) possible on his arrival. Bathurst Plains were opened up with a road across the Blue Mountains in 1814–1815. Elizabeth Macquarie advised her husband on creating public spaces – she knew about landscaping country estates – her involvement in creating the setting of her family home, Airds House, in Argyle, Scotland had impressed him. She and Francis Greenway had elaborate visions for Sydney. To achieve a picturesque setting, parks were created and buildings carefully designed and arranged to enhance the composition and create vistas. This form of landscaping was often used in English gentry country estates of the era.

Landscape gardening, in contrast to architecture, was an activity where it was then acceptable for women to participate. Elizabeth was responsible for introducing it into Australia. As the Governor's wife she could and did influence the design of public and military buildings. The Macquaries transformed the Sydney and Parramatta Domains in picturesque style, sweeping away Phillip's more utilitarian, straight lined beds and layout of paddocks.

Macquarie had unofficially employed convict architect, Francis Greenway from 1814, to inspect works and copy designs from Mrs Macquarie's pattern books; appointing him Acting Government Architect and Assistant Surveyor in 1816. In that year Greenway prepared schemes including the First Government House and stables, Fort Macquarie and Dawes Point Barracks. With these he envisaged landscaped gardens. Of his vision for Sydney Cove only the stables (now Conservatorium) and this obelisk remain. Convict labour cleared and levelled the site.

The roughly triangular area bounded by the Government Domain to its east, the civil officers' houses to the south, the Tank Stream to the west and the houses of Messrs. Lord, Thompson and Reibey on its north was to be cleared of buildings and enclosures and made into an open area to be named "Macquarie Place". There was no reference to access for the inhabitants of the town and its very naming implied possession. Although it was not enunciated in 1810, Macquarie's immediate moves to replace the guard house to the west of First Government, to construct new residences for officials and to enclose Macquarie Place with a dwarf stone wall and paling in 1816, indicated that Macquarie Place was a triangular town "square" accessible only to the surrounding and sanctioned residents. The Obelisk constructed in 1817–1819 was primarily ornamental but given a more functional status, provided a decorative centre piece. The water fountain, demolished before it was completed in its first manifestation under Mrs Macquarie's instructions and replaced with a structure to a design by Francis Greenway, stood at the south-west corner outside the Macquarie Place enclosure, providing a publicly-accessible water source as far removed from Government House as possible while providing a suitable ambience to the approach to First Government House from the town.

Macquarie Place was the first planned town square in Sydney, as well as the geographic centre of the early Colony, marked by the erection of the Obelisk at the centre of this park in 1818. Macquarie Place was the first formally laid out public space in Sydney and thus in Australia. Governor Macquarie was responsible for its formal layout, befitting its important situation at the centre of the colony. The park and the memorials standing in this park outline the development of Sydney since its foundation.

Macquarie Place separated the town from the Governor's private domain, including the First Government House and its grounds extending into and including the present day Domain. Macquarie Place thus marked the boundary between the grounds of Government House and the surrounding residential allotments owned by the elite and leading Colonial officials of the early colony, including the Colonial Judge's residence and offices, Colonial Secretary's residence and offices, Simeon Lord, Andrew Thompson and Mary Reibey. The park containing the Obelisk formed the main town square of Sydney and both were popular subjects for many artists in the early days of the colony, including Conrad Martens, Joseph Fowles, Thomas Watling and Major James Taylor. This parcel of land was gazetted as Macquarie Place in 1810.

The western side of the reserve was available for private purchase, while the south side was occupied by Government buildings and the east by the Governor's Domain. Significant emancipist traders such as Mary Reibey and Simeon Lord bought land on the west and Lord's prominent three-storey mansion occupied the site of today's (1931) Kyle House.

=== Macquarie Place ===
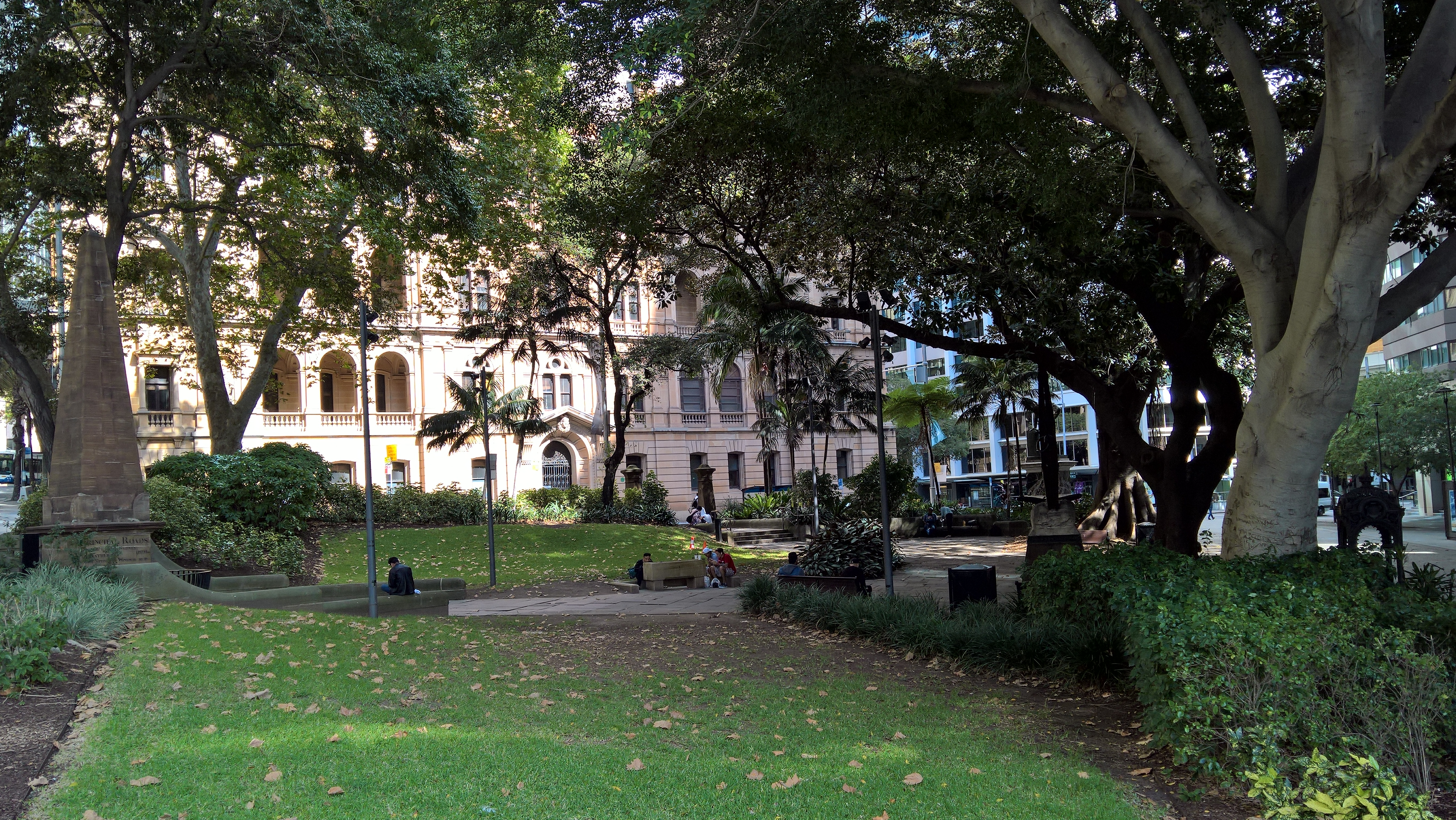
Macquarie Place Park in 2019

Macquarie Place is now the oldest town square in Australia. Together with Hyde Park, it is also the oldest urban park in Australia and has been in continuous operation as a public space for at least 195 years.

==== The obelisk ====
The Obelisk is the oldest surviving milestone built to mark the place from which all public roads in the Colony were to be measured, and is the second oldest known European monument in Australia. The oldest known monument is the 1811 obelisk also erected by Macquarie's Regiment at Watsons Bay to commemorate the completion of construction of the road to South Head. An obelisk could be used to mark a point from which a view could be obtained and could form an element in a vista to draw the eye. It is assumed this one was designed not only to enhance the entrance to Government House but also the vistas from it and the Government Domain / Governor's Pleasure Garden (to the east and south). The scale of Sydney has much changed but the obelisk was once clearly visible from the ridges above Sydney Cove, the front of Government House and the North Shore. The park in which it was built was divided into segments by paths leading to the sandstone obelisk. A low wall surrounded the reserve.

Obelisks originated as Egyptian sacred symbols to sun God, Heliopolis. Pairs flanked temple entrances. Many were transported to Rome by emperors and erected in public squares. Adding a cross on top turned them into Christian symbols. Renaissance designers used them singly to mark particular points, such as the Piazza in front of St. Peter's, Rome. Gardens such as the Villa Lante, Bagnaia and Pitti Palace, Florence also used them. These inspired many English gentlemen on the "Grand Tour", and were widely published, probably finding their way into private libraries such as those of Elizabeth Macquarie and Francis Greenway. She brought pattern books with her here. He had to sell his library to pay creditors and relied on memory, and her books. Lord Burlington erected an obelisk in the gardens of Chiswick House, London (c. 1724) and they became a very fashionable element, especially after one was erected, with pyramid, in Bath, by Richard (Beau) Nash (1734). Elizabeth Macquarie and Greenway may both have visited, or at least seen drawings of Bath.

The obelisk's form seems to be directly influenced by Georgian examples rather than Egyptian: Greenway is reputed to have based his design on that of Nash in Bath. It is also possible the source of the Macquaries' fancy may have been the pair of obelisks in the Passeio Publico overlooking the harbour in Rio de Janeiro, which they visited in August 1809.

Governor Macquarie caused the sandstone Obelisk to be erected in the (then) centre of Macquarie Place in 1818 to mark the place from where all public roads were to be measured for the expansion of the colony into the interior on New South Wales. It was erected near the carriageway into the first Government House. "New South Wales" at the time was mapped as covering two-thirds of the continent, excluding only the territories now known as Western Australia. The distances and other Colonial centres inscribed on the Obelisk show the actual extent of the still tiny colony in 1818 despite its vast extent shown on maps at the time. Mileage is given only for Bathurst, Windsor, Parramatta, Liverpool, South Head and the North Head of Botany Bay. This was nevertheless the first major expansion of Sydney town into the interior of New South Wales, compared to when Macquarie first became Governor when he described the poor state of the colony, noting that the roads only penetrated forty miles into the interior. Built between 1816 and 1818, the obelisk before the Department of Lands building is literally the "hub" of NSW, the datum point from which all distances in NSW were measured from Sydney. Its inscriptions record the extent of the road network in 1818.

The Obelisk operated as the "zero point" for measuring the distance of roads from Sydney from 1818. It played a central role in the subsequent surveying, mapping and planned expansion of the Colony from the early 1800s beyond the current extent of New South Wales. Surveyors measured and laid out the line of many roads. Distances in the County of Cumberland were measured from this Obelisk. Those distances were also recorded at the side of the road on milestones or other distance markers. Road plans prepared by surveyors show these distances as well. Public works officers and workers were responsible for forming and making the roads, but it was the surveyors who laid them out, thus providing a direct link to the Macquarie Place Obelisk. The early surveyors of the Colony at the time of the erection of the Obelisk for this purpose included John Oxley, who was appointed by Governor Macquarie as Surveyor General in 1812, and James Meehan, who was appointed by Governor Macquarie as Deputy Surveyor General from 1812 to 1822.

Much of the time of John Oxley was devoted to journeys of exploration into the interior of the colony rather than in ordinary survey work. The duties of surveying land were largely performed by James Meehan, who produced the 1807 Plan of the Town of Sydney. In addition to his surveying duties, Meehan carried out considerable journeys of exploration, a matter largely ignored by his predecessors. As a result of the recommendations of Commissioner Bigge additional surveyors and draftsmen were appointed in an attempt to overcome the arrears of survey work in the colony. In very many instances land had been occupied without any proper survey having been carried out. T L Mitchell was the Surveyor-General from 1828 to 1855, and was also responsible in the early 1830s for road building. In that role, he laid out the main Northern, Southern and Western Roads, undertaking major works such as the Victoria Pass works at Mount Victoria. The distance of these roads laid out by T L Mitchell and other major nineteenth century roads for the expansion of the Colony were measured from the Obelisk. With few exceptions, roads emanating from Sydney, in particular the historic "Great Roads" continue to be measured from the Macquarie Obelisk. The RTA "ROADLOC" distance measurement system is also measured from this point.

The Obelisk was designed by Francis Greenway, one of the most celebrated architects of early NSW with strong influence from Elizabeth Macquarie, and was built by the stonemason Edward Cureton in 1818–20. It was one of the first works of the former convict, Francis Greenway, formed part of a group of civic adornments designed by Greenway, but was the only one built due to the intervention of Commissioner Bigge. Greenway is reputed to have based his design on the influential 1734 Georgian Obelisk erected by Richard (Beau) Nash in Bath, England, more so than the Egyptian prototypes. While the stone used to construct the Obelisk would have been quarried locally near Sydney Cove, the exact location of the quarry is not known. There are no other structures in Sydney that are built from this particular fine grained white sandstone. Unusually for obelisks, this needle was constructed of ashlar blocks of sandstone because, despite the availability of a convict labour force, the technology for excavating a single block of sandstone was not available in colonial Sydney at the time.

Macquarie Place and the Obelisk provide evidence of Governor Macquarie's vision for the planning of the Colony and its future. This far exceeded the views of the British Government at the time which considered NSW to be a gaol outpost of the British Empire, and as such did not warrant the substantial public buildings, monuments and public investment by Macquarie. This was embodied in the reaction of Commissioner Bigge to the Obelisk when he travelled from England to investigate the Colonial management and convey this British view. Bigge found even this simple monument too grand for a penal settlement. Governor Macquarie defended with indignation the expense and design describing it as a "little unadorned Obelisk... rendered at a trifling expense, somewhat ornamental to the Town..." which did not, in his view, "merit any censure".

The erection of features like the Obelisk that were completed before British criticism became too severe are also remnant evidence of the attempts by Governor Macquarie and his wife to construct Sydney City as a Georgian town with a regular planned layout and elegant buildings, set within picturesque landscaped grounds. The Hyde Park Barracks, St James Church and the First Government House stables (now the Conservatorium) are other rare surviving remnants of Macquarie's Georgian town plan for Sydney. Macquarie Place and the Obelisk therefore provide a rare record of the transition of the early town from a rough penal settlement to a planned city under the direction of Governor Macquarie.

The Obelisk also demonstrated the potential for success in the Colony and the abundant opportunities even for ex-convicts like Francis Greenway. Francis Greenway was convicted of forgery in 1812 and sentenced to death. This sentence was commuted to transportation to New South Wales for 14 years. In 1816 Greenway was appointed by Governor Macquarie to the position of the first Colonial Architect and became one of the most important architects of the colonial period.

As the Colonial Architect from 1816, Greenway prepared elaborate schemes for Sydney Cove including a series of castellated buildings, Government House, Government House Stables, Fort Macquarie and the Dawes Point Barracks, plus landscaped gardens and an Egyptian styled monument on Garden Island. Only the Stables (now converted and altered for the Conservatorium of Music), St James Church, Hyde Park Barracks and the Obelisk remain of Greenway's work on implementing Macquarie's vision of the early 1800s for Sydney township.

==== The Greenway fountain ====
In 1819, Macquarie also commissioned Greenway to design the Doric fountain which was located at the western corner of the park in the location of the present statue of T. S. Mort. It was outside the fenced triangle so that the general public could have access and at the furthest point from Government House. Macquarie Place today is approximately half its original size. A path system was developed to encircle the park and these paths led to the central obelisk, as seen in 'Harper's Plan of Sydney, 1822'. The public were not allowed into the Governor's Domain, however they were permitted to promenade in front of it, along the eastern foreshore of Sydney Cove. Macquarie Place separated the town from the Domain, it was the main square at the time and would have been the site for many events. The Inner Domain at the time included Bennelong Point and Sydney Cove down to Loftus Street and south to the intersection of Bent and Macquarie Streets.

Elizabeth Macquarie was influmental in the fountain's design and construction, having a large section of its stonework pulled down and rebuilt after its niches were originally omitted. It was "still unroofed" in 1820. Controversy surrounded its erection: Bigge questioned both the contractor and Mrs Macquarie. She sent him haughty replies. Politicians hurled charges of extravagance at Macquarie, with such sarcastic phrases as "temples round pumps". Macquarie defended it vigorously.

James Broadbent and Joan Kerr in a book "Gothick Taste in the Colony of NSW" noted:

"...her Gothick buildings were meant to be seen as objects in a great landscape garden, and Lord Bathurst had some justification in resenting the fact that the British Government was footing the bill for these expensive ornaments - especially when the garden was a whole colony".

During the Macquarie era the nature of Sydney changed and elegant structures often with associated courtyards or squares were built, e.g. the Military Barracks (demolished) and Hyde Park Barracks. Macquarie introduced building regulations though they were much ignored. Buildings like the obelisk show attempts to create a Georgian town with elegant buildings and regular layout. Macquarie resigned his post before Bigge arrived but remained in office until 1821.

=== The Sirius anchor and cannon ===
Macquarie Place also retains evidence of the first defences of the Colony taken from the warship of the First Fleet. The salvaged anchor and canon of the Sirius are still mounted in Macquarie Place. The Sirius was the man-of-war flagship which escorted the First Fleet to Australia. The Sirius sailed from England with the First Fleet on 13 May 1787, arrived in Botany Bay on 20 January 1788, and anchored at Sydney Cove on 26 January 1788. The Sirius was wrecked on the coast of Norfolk Island in 1790. The Sirius cannon and anchor have been mounted at Macquarie Place for nearly a century or longer, according to different accounts. The iron cannon mounted at Macquarie Place was originally manufactured between 1767 and 1786 at the Calcutts Foundry in Shropshire, England, based on its marking with the cast founder's mark of George Matthews from this foundry, and the Royal cipher of George III whose reign was from 1760 to 1820. The cannon was landed from the Sirius shortly after the foundation of the Colony, either in 1788 or 1796 as part of one of two groups of cannons taken from the vessel, and was used on shore for defences and signalling the arrival of vessels to the isolated community.

The first group of 10 iron six-pounder cannons (plus 2 brass six-pounders and 4 twelve-pounders) were offloaded from the Sirius in 1788 to defend the new Colony. The second group of 10 cannons was salvaged from the wreck of the Sirius in 1791–1796 under the direction of Governor Hunter when he was concerned for the security and defences of the Colony against a rebellion by Irish convicts and attack by the French or Spanish warships. Most historical records indicate that the subject cannon formed one of these 10 salvaged cannons.

The location of the subject cannon before 1810 is not known, although it is possible they formed part of the first fortifications at Dawes Point or Port Phillip (now Sydney Observatory) where the iron six-pounder cannons were placed in 1788, or later positions established by Governor Hunter and Governor King for the salvaged cannons at Bennelong Point, Garden Island, Windmill Hill, and unidentified positions described by Governor Hunter as "the most commanding eminences which cover the town of Sydney". It is known that after 1810 the subject cannon was stationed at the Macquarie lighthouse at South Head as a signal gun by Governor Macquarie, together with three other salvaged cannons. The cannon was moved to Macquarie Place in the 1880s. In 1905 the anchor of the Sirius was salvaged from the wreck and mounted in this location with the cannon at Macquarie Place in 1907.

Macquarie Place and the surrounding area is also the site of the first constructed defences of Sydney Cove when the First Redoubt was built near its northern end as the first fortification of Sydney from 1788 to 1791. A redoubt is a temporary, stand-alone, fully enclosed fortification, generally constructed of earth walls. The 1788 redoubt at Sydney Cove was square in shape. Two cannons taken from the Sirius in 1788 were located at this Redoubt from 1788 to 1791, however, they were the two brass cannons, and therefore not the existing iron cannon. Macquarie Place took on its current size during the 1830s. During the 1830s, the relocation of Government House and extension of Castlereagh Street (now Loftus Street) through the original extent of Macquarie Place reduced the park to its present size from a public square to a small park, with the Obelisk situated near the boundary of Loftus Street.

The park around Macquarie Place was reduced between 1836 and 1843 and Loftus Street was created. This may have coincided with constructing Semi-Circular Quay, the Customs House and Alfred Street in the 1850s. Joseph Fowles in 1848 made drawings of Sydney's highlights including this obelisk and fountain. Warehouses were built facing Loftus Street.

The park contains many mature trees with fig trees remnant of the street planting scheme of the 1860s.

Farrer Place dates to 1865 as, first Fountain Street (1871) (suggesting it led to the c. 1820 fountain), Raphael Street (1880) after a Councillor; Raphael Place and Raphael Triangle (1902+).

In 1935 the Minister for Agriculture requested that it and the triangular plantation space fronting the building housing the Department of Agriculture (the southern part of today's Education Building) be renamed "Farrer Place". This commemorated William Farrer (1845–1906) a noted wheat breeder whose work had incalculable benefit to the wheat industry, as he selected strains suitable for Australian conditions.

A Mayor of Sydney left his memorial with the 1869 stone gate posts facing Bridge Street marked with the words "Walter Renny, Esq., Mayor 1869".

=== Statue of Thomas Sutcliffe Mort ===
In the 1880s large Government buildings (Lands; Education; Chief Secretary's) were built along Bridge Street. Macquarie Place had become enclosed with a palisade fence. The fountain appears to have been demolished in c. 1887 to make way for the statue of Thomas Sutcliffe Mort.

The development of commerce and industry in Sydney is represented in Macquarie Place by an imposing bronze statue of Thomas Sutcliffe Mort, who died in 1878. He was "A pioneer of Australian resources, a founder of Australian industries, one who established our wool market" states the inscription on the plinth. He was one of the first in Australia to make the export of perishable food possible by refrigeration, and to provide docks for the reception of the world's shipping. Mort was also a major founder of the ship building and repair industry in Australia. His statue represents the evolution of a new Sydney – a city conscious of its dignity as the nucleus of a self-supporting and expanding colony within the Empire.

The statue was erected in this location in 1883. It replaced the earlier Doric Fountain of 1819–1820. Archaeological remains of the fountain may survive below ground beneath the footings of the statue. The Governor's unveiling of the statue was witnessed by hundreds of workers who had voluntarily forfeited a day's pay in order that they might be present for this final tribute to their late employer.

Mort (1816–1878) emigrated to NSW in 1838, setting up as an auctioneer in 1843, becoming an innovator in wool sales. His wealth facilitated his considerable horticultural ambitions, realised at Sydney's then-finest garden, Greenoaks (now Bishopscourt), Darling Point, which set the tone for villas in this fashionable Sydney resort. He employed gardeners Michael Guilfoyle, Michael Bell and George Mortimore, creating a celebrated landscape garden. President of the NSW Horticultural Society in from 1862 to 1878, he maintained enthusiasm for horticulture over 30 years, first as an exhibitor and top prize winner in the Society's shows, and later as an administrator. At Greenoaks he hosted some of the Society's shows and grew an array of plants, including orchids and pursuing the hybridisation of cacti.

By the 1890s mature trees dominated: the obelisk was obscured. In c. 1917 a staircase on either side was built; Loftus Street was now higher. By the 1930s it was re-landscaped as an urban park flanked by warehouses and offices. Further schemes occurred in c. 1970 and c. 1980.

Around 1910 changes to the park included removal of an enclosing wrought iron fence and reduction in the number of fig trees from fifteen to four. During World War I the area around the obelisk was altered. The level of Loftus Street appears to have been raised at this time and a new staircase and retaining wall were built adjacent to the Obelisk. Gravel was installed between the outer fence and the Obelisk.

Two of the London Plane trees in Macquarie Place were planted in 1954 by Queen Elizabeth II and the Duke of Edinburgh, during the first visit to Australia by a reigning monarch. These trees commemorate the royal visit, mark the beginning of the Remembrance Driveway to Canberra, and recreate the site's original function of being the starting point for main roads from Sydney.

Further 19th and early 20th century public memorials of exceptional quality and design which were relocated or erected in the park included an 1857 drinking fountain (relocated to this position in the 1970s) and the 1908 domed lavatory (now partly an archaeological site).

=== Fountain and pond by Gerald Lewers ===
In 1960, a small bronze fountain was added to the park designed by the renowned sculptor Gerald Lewers, in remembrance of an Australian sculptor, Lieutenant John Christie Wright, who was killed at age 28 during service in France in 1917. The current wall and steps surrounding the Obelisk were also constructed at this time.

According to Peter Webber, a former professor of architecture at the University of Sydney and a former government architect, the obelisk at Macquarie Place was damaged when a truck careered into its base in about 1970; the incised lettering on the replacement panels to the eastern side is crude by comparison with that on the undamaged surviving original panels. In 1976 several alterations were made including an extension of the western corner of the park, and alterations to pathways, Macquarie Place was closed to motor traffic, the iron drinking fountain was relocated, and plantings and paving were altered.

The park though somewhat reduced in size has continued to operate as a public space since 1810. Its landscaping and levels have changed but the obelisk remains in its original location and form. Towering buildings and trees now dominate the site. Sydney City Council allocated $450,000 for obelisk conservation works in 2006.

== Description ==
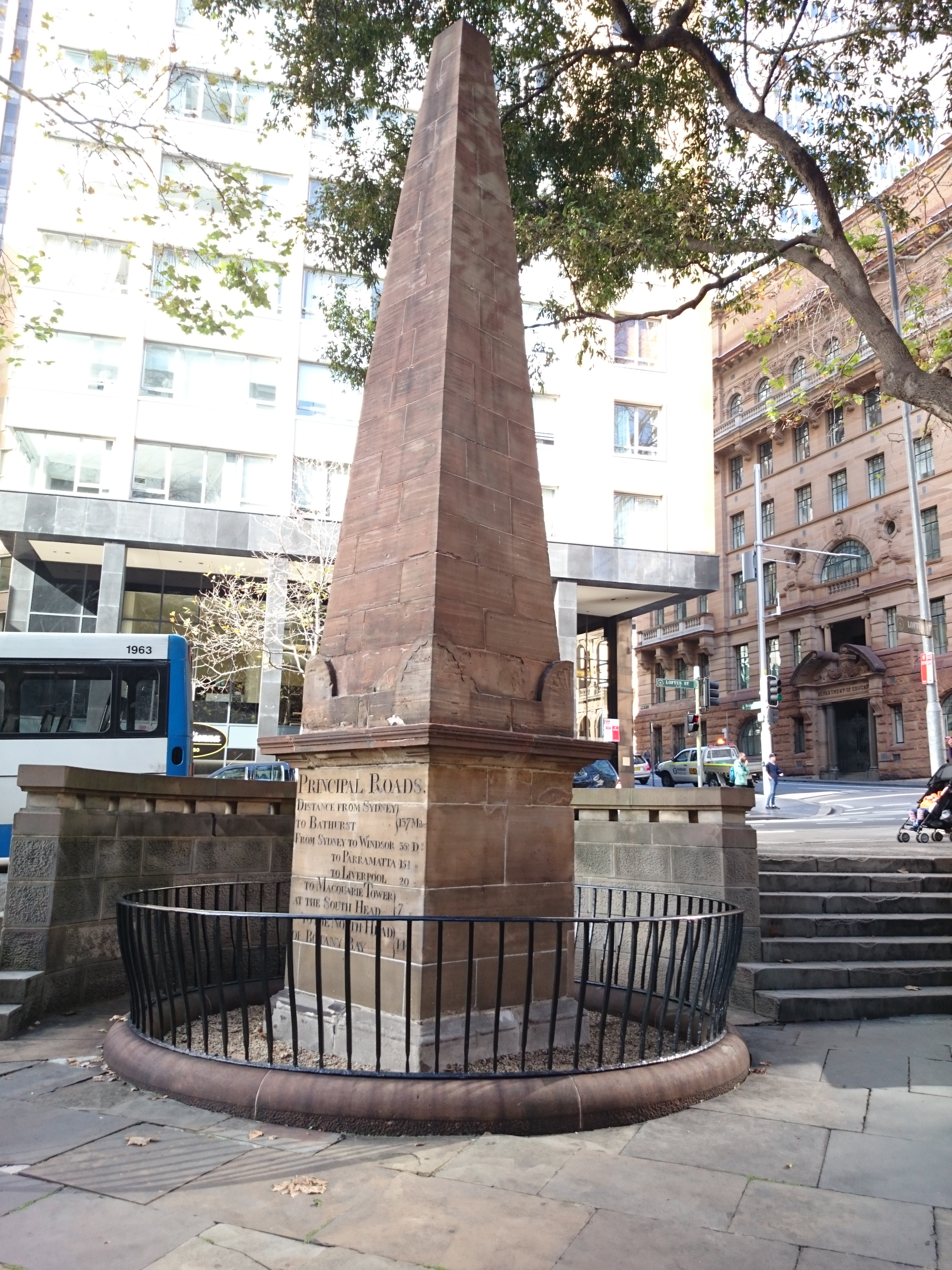
The Obelisk in Macquarie Place Park

Macquarie Place is a triangular public open space surrounded on two sides (south, east) by a low sandstone wall.

Its plantings are mostly mature and include three plane trees (Platanus x hybrida) facing Loftus Street to its east, two Moreton Bay figs (Ficus macrophylla) on the western side and an evergreen/holly/holm oak (Quercus ilex) flanked by two clumps of Lord Howe Island palms (Howea fosteriana) and one clump of soft tree ferns (Cyathea sp.) on the Bridge Street (southern) side. A young weeping lily pilly (Waterhousia floribunda) is also in the south-eastern corner.

Originally the park was approximately double its current size but was reduced sometime between late 1836 and 1843 by the construction of Loftus Street. Historically, the north west oblique boundary of Macquarie Place appears to be an important building alignment which, although buildings are different from those there in 1807, has remained relatively unchanged.

The park includes numerous monuments and memorials including:

The Obelisk

This is a sandstone obelisk designed by Francis Greenway and built by stonemason Edward Cureton between 1816 and 1818 to furnish Sydney's first public square and to mark the place from which all public roads in the colony were to be measured. It is literally the "hub" of NSW, the datum point from which all distances in NSW were measured from Sydney. Its inscriptions record the extent of the road network in 1818.

The obelisk is designed in the Georgian period and detailed in the Greek revival style. The obelisk's form seems to be directly influenced by Georgian examples rather than Egyptian: Greenway is reputed to have based his design on that of Nash in Bath. It is also possible the source of the Macquaries' fancy may have been the pair of obelisks in the Passeio Publico overlooking the harbour in Rio de Janeiro, which they visited in August 1809. It is an elongated pyramid on a narrow square pedestal decorated by projecting cornice and base. The pedestal contains the original inscription and is surrounded by a low stone wall with a later simple curved wrought iron balustrade. Building materials are sandstone and a wrought iron balustrade. The sandstone would have been quarried locally near Sydney Cove, however the exact location of the quarry is not known. There are no other structures in Sydney that are built from this particular fine grained white sandstone.

The lettering on the Obelisk is incised blackened lettering of a Roman type face in a style that is recognisably Georgian in style, and is one of only four remaining examples of this style and period of lettering in the inner City. This records the distances to the major outer settlements at the time of 1818 – namely Bathurst, Windsor, Parramatta, Liverpool, South Head and the North Head of Botany Bay.

The Sirius anchor and cannon

These are relics of the flagship of the First Fleet, of HMS "Sirius", that was wrecked two years later in 1790 on Norfolk Island. The bronze statue of Thomas Sutcliffe Mort, who died in 1878 is inscribed with the dedication on the plinth "A pioneer of Australian resources, a founder of Australian industries, one who established our wool market". A Mayor of Sydney left his memorial with the 1869 sandstone gate posts facing Bridge Street marked with the words "Walter Renny, Esq., Mayor 1869". Further 19th century and early 20th century public memorials relocated or erected in the park also include the 1908 domed lavatory (now partly an archaeological site) and an 1857 cast iron drinking fountain. A small bronze fountain designed by the renowned sculptor, Gerald Lewers, was installed in 1960. Two of the London Plane trees were planted in 1954 by Queen Elizabeth II and the Duke of Edinburgh. These trees mark the beginning of the Remembrance Driveway to Canberra.

Archaeological remains

Possible footings (archaeological remains) of a fountain designed by Francis Greenway and Mrs Macquarie, built by the same contractor Edward Cureton under Mrs Macquarie's direction: it was "still unroofed" in 1820. This was on the western side of Macquarie Place and supplied water to local residents. The fountain was demolished c. 1887 to make way for the statue of Thomas Mort.

Thomas Sutcliffe Mort statue

This c. 1887 statue looking out over Bridge Street, Sydney's premier financial street, commemorates businessman and horticulturist, wool baron and frozen meat entrepreneur Thomas Sutcliffe Mort (1816–78), who emigrated to NSW in 1838 setting up as an auctioneer in 1843, becoming an innovator in wool sales. His wealth facilitated his considerable horticultural ambitions, realised at Sydney's then-finest garden, Greenoaks (now Bishopscourt), Darling Point, which set the tone for villas in this fashionable Sydney resort. Mort employed gardeners Michael Guilfoyle, Michael Bell and George Mortimore, creating a celebrated landscape garden. President of the NSW Horticultural Society in the 1860s he pursued hybridisation of cacti.

Memorial gate pillars facing Bridge Street & Department of Lands Building

These sandstone gate pillars commemorate Walter Penny, Mayor of Sydney, in 1869.

Fountain and pond by Gerald Lewers

This commemorates, an Australian sculptor, Lieutenant John Christie Wright, who was killed at age 28 during service in France in 1917.

=== Condition ===
As of 15 September 2005, the trees, monuments and park are all generally in good condition. The Heritage Council Technical Advisory Group is being consulted by City of Sydney Council for the restoration and maintenance of the Obelisk (2005).

In terms of archaeological potential, the site may contribute to our understanding of the settlement and occupation of early town leases in Sydney through its potential for archaeological remains from the pre-1814 development of the land as a town lease, which was levelled for the improvements by Governor Macquarie for the construction of the park. This is extremely rare on two accounts, first because it remained largely undeveloped from 1814 onwards, except as part of a reserve. Secondly, most archaeological sites in Sydney which relate to the occupation of town allotments to c.1814 have been destroyed by subsequent development.

The current extent of Macquarie Place dates from the 1830s when it was reduced by the construction of Loftus Street. The Obelisk has a high degree of original integrity and requires some restoration of the 1818 fabric. The Heritage Council Technical Advisory Group is being consulted by City of Sydney Council for the restoration of the Obelisk (2005).

=== Modifications and dates ===
Macquarie Place has been greatly reduced in size since Macquarie's time. The park has been subject to various changes and stages of development over the years from the early 1800s. Some of these stages are:

- 1792 – The land of Macquarie Place is represented as such in 1792 Governor Phillip's Survey of the settlement
- 1793 – Sketch of Sydney by Ferdinand Brambila also shows the land of Macquarie Place. The triangular shape responded to the natural topography of the original shoreline of Sydney Cove and the Tank Stream. The triangular area was formed by the intersection of three early Colonial roads running in direct lines between three important constructions of the colonial period, including the Guard House at the entrance to First Government House at the south-eastern tip of the triangle, the bridge over the Tank Stream at the south-western tip of the triangle, and the 1788 fortifications (replaced by the Dry Store in 1791) beside the Government Wharf at the northern tip of the triangle. Macquarie Place may have operated as a public place of gathering for the early settlement from as early as 1791 alongside the Dry Store, located in the approximate present-day location of Customs House. At least half of the population still depended upon this Dry Store for collecting their food rations by 1801.
- 1807 – A triangular layout had been formalised (relating to the existing layout of plots) and a guard house built next to Government House's main entrance.
- 1810 – Macquarie set aside Macquarie Place as public ground.
- 1818/19 – Obelisk and Doric Fountain built. The park in which it was built was divided into segments by paths leading to the sandstone obelisk. A low wall surrounded the reserve.
- 1830s – Reduction of size of park.
- 1869–1910 – Addition of various monuments.
- 1910 – Changes including the reduction of number of fig trees.
- 1954 – Two Plane trees planted.
- 1960 – Fountain added.
- 1976 – Alterations as listed in historical notes.

== Heritage listing ==
As at 8 December 2008, Macquarie Place represents one of the most historically significant urban spaces in Sydney and Australia, which was first established less than 25 years after the arrival of the First Fleet. The 1810 park and its later monuments outline the development of Sydney since its colonial foundation. Macquarie Place was the first and main town square of colonial Sydney and is a surviving remnant of the first town centre of Sydney beside First Government House (now demolished) and on the original foreshores of Sydney Cove before the shoreline was extended. The Obelisk, erected in Macquarie Place in 1818, is the geographic centre point of nineteenth century Sydney, the Colony, and the network of nineteenth century roads throughout NSW. It was erected in this location by Governor Macquarie to mark the place from where all public roads were to be measured and has continued to perform this function over most of the history of European settlement in Australia, for over 190 years. The park and monument were well recognised landmarks of colonial Sydney and appeared in many nineteenth century artist views, including paintings by Conrad Martens.

Although the original importance of Macquarie Place as the main town square of Sydney, the geographic and symbolic centre of the Colony, the setting to First Government House and the landmark qualities of Obelisk are now less apparent than in Colonial times due to the level of surrounding changes, the park and its monuments remain one of the few tangible links to this first Colonial town centre and thereby part of the earliest history of European settlement in Australia. It is also possibly the only remnant of the natural landform of the original foreshores of Sydney Cove which has survived relatively unchanged over two centuries of European settlement, and can therefore symbolise the first place of meeting between Aboriginal people of the Eora Country and British settlers at Sydney Cove in 1788.

Macquarie Place represents the oldest planned town square in Australia. Together with Hyde Park, it is also the oldest urban park in Australia, and has been in continuous use as a public space for at least 195 years, possibly operating as a public place of gathering from as early as 1791. The Obelisk is the oldest milestone for measuring of roads in Australia and the second oldest known European monument in Australia. The inscriptions on the Obelisk provide evidence of the extent of the small colony in 1818 when the colony was first expanding into the interior of New South Wales. The Obelisk was also the "symbolic peg" indicating the far extent of the British Empire in the early 1800s.

Macquarie Place and the Obelisk are rare surviving evidence of the transition of the Colony from a rough penal settlement to a planned town during the early 1800s under the direction of Governor Macquarie. This transition is demonstrated by the function of the Obelisk in the expansion of the Colony, by the establishment of a formal centre to the Colony, by the first formal layout of public space, and by the quality and design of the park and monument. The Obelisk and Macquarie Place are fine examples of the layout and ornamentation of Sydney town and its public spaces in the Georgian style, and rare surviving remnants of Macquarie's Georgian town plan for Sydney, together with the Hyde Park Barracks, St James Church, and First Government House Stables (now the Conservatorium). The Obelisk was designed by one of the most celebrated architects of the Colonial period, Francis Greenway, and was built by stonemason, Edward Cureton, with convict labour.

These qualities of the Obelisk and Macquarie Place symbolise Macquarie's vision for a permanent planned settlement, which provided the genesis for the development of the nation, and which far exceeded the views of the British Government of the Colony as simply a penal settlement. When the Obelisk was first erected in Macquarie Place, Commissioner Bigge, representing the British Government, found even this simple monument too grand for a penal colony. Governor Macquarie defended the expense and design of the monument with indignation as a "little unadorned Obelisk...rendered at a trifling expense, somewhat ornamental to the Town" which in his view did not "merit any censure". It was this difference of opinion that contributed to the resignation of a disillusioned Governor Macquarie, and meant that many of his plans and Greenway's designs for an elegant Georgian township were not realised.

The "Sirius" cannon and anchor mounted in Macquarie Place are rare relics of the first defences of the Colony by the man-of-war flagship of the First Fleet that arrived in Sydney Cove in 1788. Both the cannon and anchor have been mounted in Macquarie Place for over a century after the canon and anchor were salvaged from the wreck of the vessel in 1791 and 1905 respectively and mounted at Macquarie Place in the 1880s and 1907. Macquarie Place is also the site of the first constructed defences of Sydney Cove when the First Redoubt was built at its northern end as the first fortification of Sydney from 1788 to 1791.

Later public monuments and structures constructed in Macquarie Place illustrate the continued civic importance of the park and demonstrate the continued evolution and achievements in the civic planning, services, design, construction, industry and growth of Sydney since Colonial times.

Macquarie Place Precinct was listed on the New South Wales State Heritage Register on 5 March 2010 having satisfied the following criteria.

The place is important in demonstrating the course, or pattern, of cultural or natural history in New South Wales.

Macquarie Place represents one of the most historically significant urban spaces in Sydney and Australia, complete with numerous public monuments which demonstrate the history of Australian settlement from its colonial foundation. Macquarie Place was the first and main town square of colonial Sydney, and is a surviving remnant of the first town centre of Sydney beside First Government House (now demolished) and on the original foreshores of Sydney Cove before the shoreline was extended. The park and Obelisk were well recognised landmarks of colonial Sydney and appeared in many nineteenth century artist views, including paintings by Conrad Martens. Macquarie Obelisk and Macquarie Place both mark the geographic centre of the Colony during the early 1800s, and provide a very rare remnant of the early days of the development of Sydney Town and the planning of the Colony by Governor Macquarie.

Although the original importance of Macquarie Place as the main town square of Sydney, the geographic and symbolic centre of the Colony, the setting to First Government House and the landmark qualities of Obelisk are now less apparent than in Colonial times due to the level of surrounding changes, the park and its monuments remain one of the few tangible links to this first Colonial town centre and thereby part of the earliest history of European settlement in Australia. It is also possibly the only remnant of the natural landform of the original foreshores of Sydney Cove which has survived relatively unchanged over two centuries of European settlement, and can therefore symbolise the first place of meeting between Aboriginal people and British settlers at Sydney Cove in 1788.

Macquarie Obelisk is the oldest surviving milestone built to mark the place from which all public roads in the Colony were to be measured, and is the second oldest known European monument in Australia. Macquarie Place is the oldest urban park in Australia, together with Hyde Park, and has been in continuous use as a public space for over 190 years. Both Macquarie Place and the Obelisk were constructed less than 30 years after the arrival of the First Fleet near the original shores of Sydney Cove and First Government House.

The Obelisk was erected by Macquarie in 1818 as the "zero point" milestone from which the expansion of the Colony was physically measured. The inscriptions on the Obelisk evidence the extent of the relatively small Colony at the time. The Obelisk was also the "symbolic peg" indicating the far extent of the British Empire during the early 1800s.

The Obelisk and Macquarie Place provide rare evidence of the formative period of the colony, and its transition from a rough penal settlement to a planned town under the direction of Governor Macquarie. This was recognised shortly after the construction of the park and Obelisk by the ire of the British Government which objected to the elegance of public works by Governor Macquarie and specifically the Obelisk for being too grand for a penal settlement. The Obelisk and Macquarie Place symbolise Macquarie's vision for a permanent planned settlement, which provided the genesis for the development of the nation, and which far exceeded the views of the British Government at the time. Both demonstrate the transition of the Colony from a rough penal settlement to a planned town by the function of the Obelisk in the expansion of the Colony, by the establishment of a formal centre to the Colony, by the first formal layout of public space, and by the quality and design of the park and monument.

Macquarie Place and its surrounding area is also the site of the first defences of the newly settled colony. It was the location of the First Redoubt which was the first attempt at fortifications at Sydney Cove (a plaque on the footpath marks the location of the First Redoubt). The "Sirius" cannon and anchor have been mounted at Macquarie Place since the 1880s and 1907 respectively, which are relics from the warship of the First Fleet and thus of the first settlement and defences by the British.

The triangular shape of the park is a remnant of the early Colonial street layout that responded to the natural topography of the Tank Stream valley and which linked three major constructions of the Colonial period including First Government House, the bridge over the Tank Stream, and the First Redoubt (replaced by the Dry Store) located beside Government Wharf. The remaining Moreton Bay Fig trees are remnants of the 1860s street planting scheme.

Later monuments in Macquarie Place demonstrate the evolution of Sydney from these earliest stages, its achievements, technological advancements and civic pride as a major City. The development of commerce and industry in Sydney, in particular the wool industry, is represented in Macquarie Place by a bronze statue of Thomas Sutcliffe Mort, who died in 1878. The statue of Thomas Mort represents the evolution of a new Sydney, a city conscious of its dignity as the nucleus of a self-supporting and expanding colony within the Empire. A Mayor of Sydney has also left his memorial with the 1869 stone gate posts facing Bridge Street marked with the words "Walter Renny, Esq., Mayor 1869". The 1908 domed lavatory (now partly an archaeological site) records the major reforms and achievements of the early 20th century in sanitation, public health, technology and City design, which transformed Sydney and the other city centres of Australia into modern cities. Two of the London Plane trees in Macquarie Place planted in 1954 by Queen Elizabeth II and the Duke of Edinburgh commemorate the first visit to Australia by a reigning monarch, mark the beginning of the Remembrance Driveway to Canberra, and recreate the site's original function of being the starting point for main roads from Sydney. A small bronze fountain designed by the renowned sculptor, Gerald Lewers, is a memorial to an Australian sculptor, Lieut. John Christie Wright, who was killed at age 28 during service in France in 1917.

The place has a strong or special association with a person, or group of persons, of importance of cultural or natural history of New South Wales's history.

The Obelisk was designed by one of the most celebrated architects of the Colonial period (and former convict convicted for forgery) Francis Greenway, and was built by stonemason Edward Cureton with convict labour. The Obelisk was one of the first works of Greenway where he was given a free hand after he was appointed as the first Colonial Architect. It formed part of a group of civic adornments designed by Greenway but was the only one built due to the intervention of Commissioner Bigge for the British Government.

Macquarie Pace and the Obelisk at its centre were built under the direction of Governor Macquarie and is strongly associated with Macquarie and his planning of the colony. The park and monument both symbolise the divide between Macquarie's vision for the permanent planned settlement and expansion of the Colony and the view of the British Government at the time of the Colony as simply a penal settlement. When the Obelisk was first erected, Commissioner Bigge, representing the British Government, found even this simple monument too grand for a penal colony. Governor Macquarie defended the expense and design of the monument with indignation as a "little unadorned Obelisk...rendered at a trifling expense, somewhat ornamental to the Town" which in his view did not "merit any censure". It was this difference of opinion, symbolised by the monument, on the expenditure for a penal colony that contributed to the resignation of a disillusioned Governor Macquarie, and meant that many of his plans and Greenway's designs for an elegant Georgian township were not realised.

The place is important in demonstrating aesthetic characteristics and/or a high degree of creative or technical achievement in New South Wales.

The Obelisk and Macquarie Place are rare remnants of Governor Macquarie's Georgian town plan for Sydney based on a regular planned layout and elegant buildings, set within picturesque landscaped grounds. They are fine examples of the early planning, ornamentation and urban design of the Colony and its public spaces in the Georgian style, of which few designs were realised at the time and fewer still have survived to the present. Macquarie Place is joined by the Hyde Park Barracks, the former Government House stables (now the Conservatorium) and St James Church as some of the few surviving remnants of Macquarie's Georgian town plan for Sydney.

The Place and the Obelisk was a well recognised landmark of the new colony and appeared in many nineteenth century artist views, including paintings for example by Conrad Martens.

Macquarie Place is also a fine example of triangular parks and street patterns of the early Colonial period that responded to the natural topography of the original foreshore of Circular Quay and the Tank Stream valley.

The design of the Obelisk and the park is an early example of the introduction of the Neo-Classical revival, imported from the Georgian city of Bath in England. Greenway is reputed to have based his design on the Georgian Obelisk erected by Beau Nash in Bath more so than the Egyptian prototypes. The design of Macquarie Place and the Obelisk are in contrast with earlier buildings in Australia which are considered to be vernacular, whereas the design of these features could be traced to the Georgian style. The proportions of the Obelisk are designed according to the Georgian rules of style and taste, which differ to later Victorian examples. The layout of the triangular park of Macquarie Place, centred on the Obelisk, incorporated many aspects of Georgian town planning, where Macquarie Place and the Obelisk were deliberately designed as part of the picturesque landscaped setting for the first Government House.

The place has a strong or special association with a particular community or cultural group in New South Wales for social, cultural or spiritual reasons.

Macquarie Place is an important green space in the city's central business district, providing an attractive green space for city residents and workers. Historically it formed the main town square of Sydney which was a popular place for early citizens of the Colony to promenade. Its continued use as a public space for over 200 years has important social significance.

The place has potential to yield information that will contribute to an understanding of the cultural or natural history of New South Wales.

The obelisk is symbolic of the expansion of the colony and as an outpost of the British Empire. The Obelisk is of research significance because it forms the central pivot of the system of highways constructed in New South Wales from the early years of the Colony in 1818. It is a well preserved example of a marker stone from which distances were measured, which continued to be used for this purpose for a lengthy period.

The site is of scientific significance because it may contribute to our understanding of the settlement and occupation of early town leases in Sydney through its potential for archaeological remains from the pre-1814 development of the land as a town lease, which was levelled for the improvements by Governor Macquarie for the construction of the park. The site is extremely rare on two accounts, first because it remained largely undeveloped from 1814 onwards, except as part of a reserve. Secondly, most archaeological sites in Sydney which relate to the occupation of town allotments to c.1814 have been destroyed by subsequent development.

There are no other structures in Sydney like the Obelisk that are built from its particular fine grained white sandstone. Unusually for Obelisks, this obelisk needle was constructed of ashlar blocks of sandstone because, despite the availability of a convict labour force, the technology for excavating a single block of sandstone was not available in Colonial Sydney at the time. It also provides evidence of one of the few surviving examples of wrought iron balustrading of its quality and period.

Archaeological remains may also survive of the 1819–1820 Doric Fountain designed by Francis Greenway. These lie somewhere in the vicinity of the T.S. Mort statue, possibly further towards the corner of Bridge Street and Macquarie Place. The building alignment on the northwest oblique boundary and the southern boundary is essentially the same as that existing in 1807 as depicted in James Meehan's Plan of the Town of Sydney (see attached map). This remnant street alignment has the potential to provide and important insight into the layout and planning of Sydney in its very early days.

The sandstone dwarf wall originally constructed around Macquarie Place in 1816 is of scientific significance because it preserves evidence of the former configuration and appearance of Macquarie Place and its formal improvements at this time.

The bower anchor (the main anchors) and cannon from the "Sirius" demonstrates aspects of shipbuilding and iron technology of the late 18th century, and have historical associations with the first settlement of Australian in 1788 by belonging to the flagship of the First Fleet. The anchor demonstrates the Admiralty Old Pattern Long Shanked type of anchor that was in common use throughout the 18th century by most major Navies and merchant vessels.

The covered cast iron drinking fountain dating from c. 1857 demonstrates an example of one of a group of such fountains manufactured in Britain for Sydney town and installed in prominent positions around the city, associated with the early provision of water by piped water mains for public use. It was relocated to Macquarie Place in the 1970s. It demonstrates a fine example of ornamental cast ironwork.

The 1907 domed Underground Public Conveniences (now partly an archaeological site) is a fine example of an Edwardian public convenience and its associated building and sanitation technology, demonstrating the high quality provision of public health and sanitation measures in Sydney following the outbreak of the Bubonic plague.

The place possesses uncommon, rare or endangered aspects of the cultural or natural history of New South Wales.

Macquarie Place and the Macquarie Obelisk provide very rare remnants of the early development of Sydney township and the earliest planning of the Colony. They provide rare surviving evidence of Governor Macquarie's vision for Sydney as a permanent planned settlement, which began the transition of the Colony from a rough penal settlement to a planned town during the early 1800s.

Macquarie Place and the Obelisk are rare evidence of the early Colonial town centre from where all public roads were measured, where the Colony was first governed, near where the First Fleet landed, where the first defences were built, where the early elite of Sydney lived, and where the first town square was laid out. Since this time, the foreshore of Sydney Cove (now Circular Quay) has been extended, first Government House has been demolished, the adjoining part of the Domain was redeveloped as part of the main town, the Tank Stream has been covered, and the centre of the town moved to the South. Although the original importance of Macquarie Place as the symbolic and geographic centre of the early Colony, the main town square of Sydney, the setting to first Government House, and the landmark qualities of the Obelisk are now less apparent than in Colonial times due to the level of surrounding changes, the park and its early monuments remain one of the few tangible links to this first Colonial town centre and thereby part of the earliest history of Australia.

Macquarie Place and the Macquarie Obelisk are rare as surviving evidence of the attempts by Governor Macquarie and his wife to construct Sydney as a Georgian town with a regular planned layout and elegant buildings, set within picturesque landscaped grounds. The Hyde Park Barracks and St James Church are other rare surviving remnants of Macquarie's Georgian town plan for Sydney (also designed by Greenway).

Macquarie Place is the first planned town square in Australia, gazetted in 1810 and which possibly operated as a gathering place from as early as 1791. Macquarie Place is now the oldest formally laid out town square in Australia. It is also the oldest urban park in Australia, together with Hyde Park, and has been in continuous use as a public space for at least 195 years.

The Macquarie Place Obelisk is rare as the second oldest surviving European monument in Australia, dating from 1818.

The Macquarie Place Obelisk is very rare as the first and oldest "zero point" milestone from which public roads were measured. The other known standing milestone of this kind and of a later date is in Kiama, although in a deteriorated condition, which provided the zero point for all roads into the town.

The only known older obelisk and European monument in Australia is the 1811 obelisk at Watson's Bay which was erected by Macquarie's regiment to commemorate their achievement in constructing a road to South Head. There are no known examples of obelisks or other European monuments built before the Watson's Bay and Macquarie Place obelisks. Other obelisks from later in the nineteenth century were erected as memorials of significant events, as ornamental picturesque objects in the landscape, or to disguise functional elements like the obelisk of the Hyde Park sewer vent at the eastern end of Bathurst Street.

The inscriptions in the Obelisk are also rare as a tangible record of the extent of the Colony at a fixed time during the early Colonial period, providing evidence of the expansion of the Colony into the interiors of NSW during this period of transition from a penal settlement to a permanent planned town. It provides an official record that shows the actual extent of colonial settlement at that time, as distinguished from some maps from this period which indicate the colony extended over most of the continent.

The Obelisk is a rare example of the work of the first Colonial Architect, Francis Greenway. It is the only Obelisk designed by Greenway that was constructed, and one of few of his constructed works to have survived. Only the Government House Stables (now converted and altered for the Conservatorium of Music), St James Church, Hyde Park Barracks and the Obelisk remain of Greenway's vision for Sydney Cove of the early 1800s.

The Macquarie Obelisk is one of few remaining convict built structures in the inner city. It is also rare for its construction of ashlar blocks for the needle rather than a single piece of sandstone, and for its materials as there are no other structures in Sydney that are built from its particular fine grained white sandstone. The Obelisk is rare for its carved detailing, as the carved fan motifs (the Acroteria) at the base of the shaft are one of the earliest examples of decorative carving in the Colony for a civic purpose, and the use of the Acroteria detail is rare generally for obelisks. The Macquarie Obelisk also provides evidence of one of the few surviving examples of wrought iron balustrading of its quality and period. It is one of only four examples of the style of incised lettering which now remain in inner Sydney, all of which date from the Macquarie era.

The anchor and cannon from the "Sirius" are rare relics of the flagship man-of-war from the First Fleet, and thus the earliest European settlement and defence of Australia. Of the 22 six-pounder canons offloaded or salvaged from the vessel in 1788 and 1791–1796, there is only one other known surviving six-pounder cannon from the "Sirius" where its provenance has been established within reasonable doubt, which is now held by the National Maritime Museum. The anchor is one of only three known surviving bower anchors (the main anchors) from the "Sirius". The other two are located at the National Maritime Museum and Norfolk Island. The anchor is rare in New South Wales as a surviving example of the Admiralty Old Pattern Long Shanked type of anchor. Only five other examples of this type of anchor have been identified in New South Wales as underwater archaeological relics or are on public display.

The place is important in demonstrating the principal characteristics of a class of cultural or natural places/environments in New South Wales.

The Obelisk and Macquarie Place represents the geographic and symbolic centre of Sydney during the early Colonial period, from which all public roads were measured and as the main town square separating the town lots of the elite of Sydney from the grounds of first Government House.

The triangular shape of Macquarie Place represents the early town planning in Sydney when street planning responded to the natural topography of the original foreshore of Circular Quay and the Tank Stream, instead of a formal grid pattern. The remaining fig trees also represent the street planting of the time, influenced by Charles Moore, the Director of the Royal Botanic Gardens, 1848–1896.

The Obelisk is an example of the markers used as the point from which distances are measured found in major city centres. It operated as the "zero point" for measuring the distance of roads from Sydney from 1818 until this function was replaced by the General Post Office.

Macquarie Place and the Obelisk are fine examples of the early planning, ornamentation and urban design of the Colony and its public spaces during the early 1800s based on Governor Macquarie's plan and Francis Greenway's designs for an elegant Georgian township, of which few designs were realised at the time and fewer still have survived to the present. They form part of a group of the few surviving remnants of Macquarie's Georgian town plan for Sydney also including the Hyde Park Barracks, the former Government House stables (now the Conservatorium) and St James Church.

The design of the Obelisk and the park are a fine example of the introduction of the Neo-Classical revival, imported from the Georgian city of Bath in England. Greenway is reputed to have based his design on the Georgian Obelisk erected by Beau Nash in Bath more so than the Egyptian prototypes. The design of Macquarie Place and the Obelisk are in contrast with earlier buildings in Australia which are considered to be vernacular, whereas the design of these features could be traced to the Georgian style. The proportions of the Obelisk are designed according to the Georgian rules of style and taste, which differ to later Victorian examples. The layout of the triangular park of Macquarie Place, centred on the Obelisk, incorporated many aspects of Georgian town planning, where Macquarie Place and the Obelisk were deliberately designed as part of the picturesque landscaped setting for the first Government House.

The Macquarie Obelisk is a fine example of a monument constructed in the form of an Obelisk. While characteristic for obelisks in many of its features, there are significant design variations. It is a fine example of the unusual use of the Acroteria motif detail in the carving and the construction of the needle from ashlar blocks of sandstone rather than a single piece of sandstone.

== Gallery ==
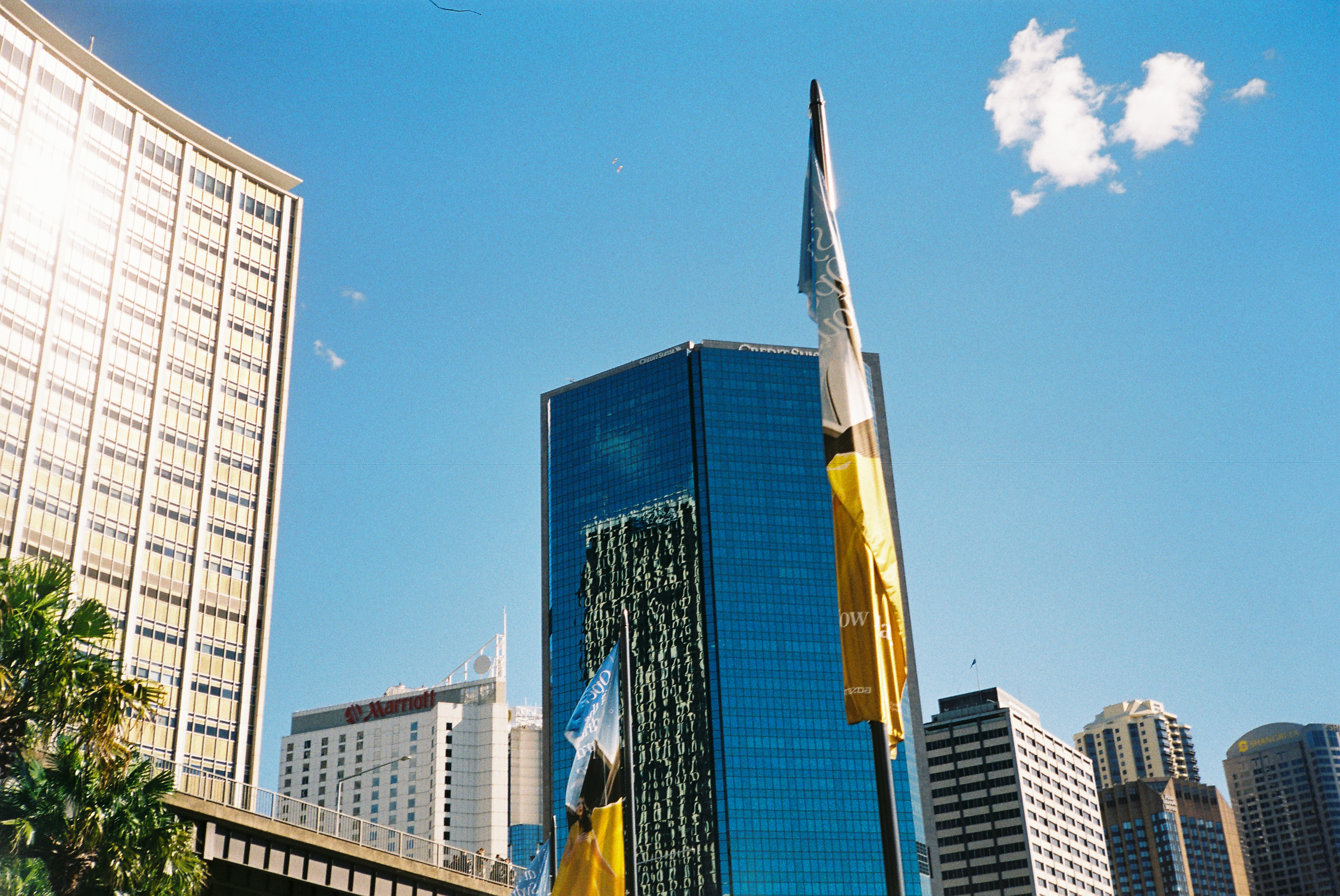
Gateway Plaza building at 1 Macquarie Place

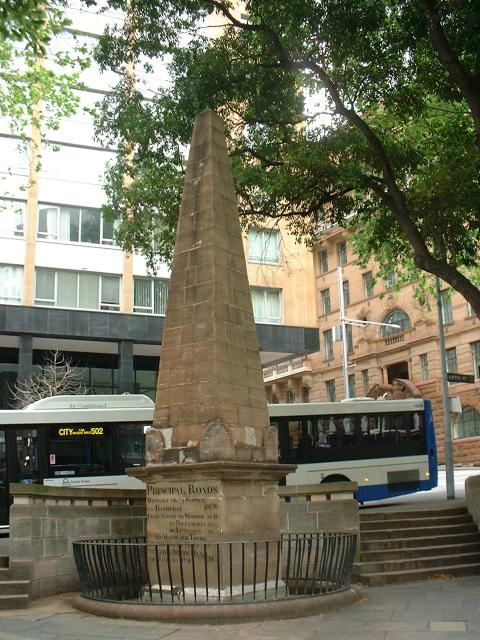
The Macquarie Obelisk.

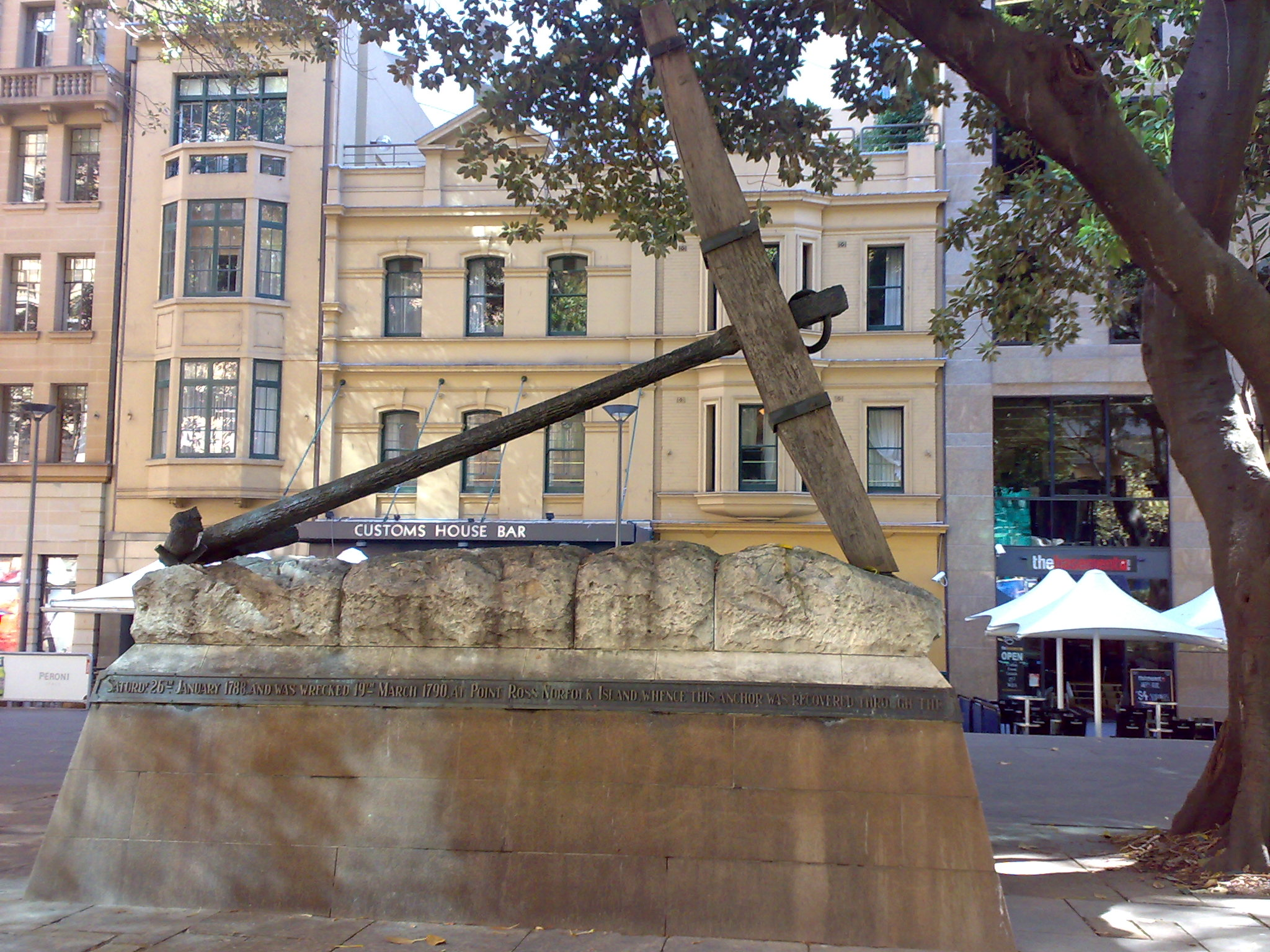
The anchor from HMS Sirius as it stands today.

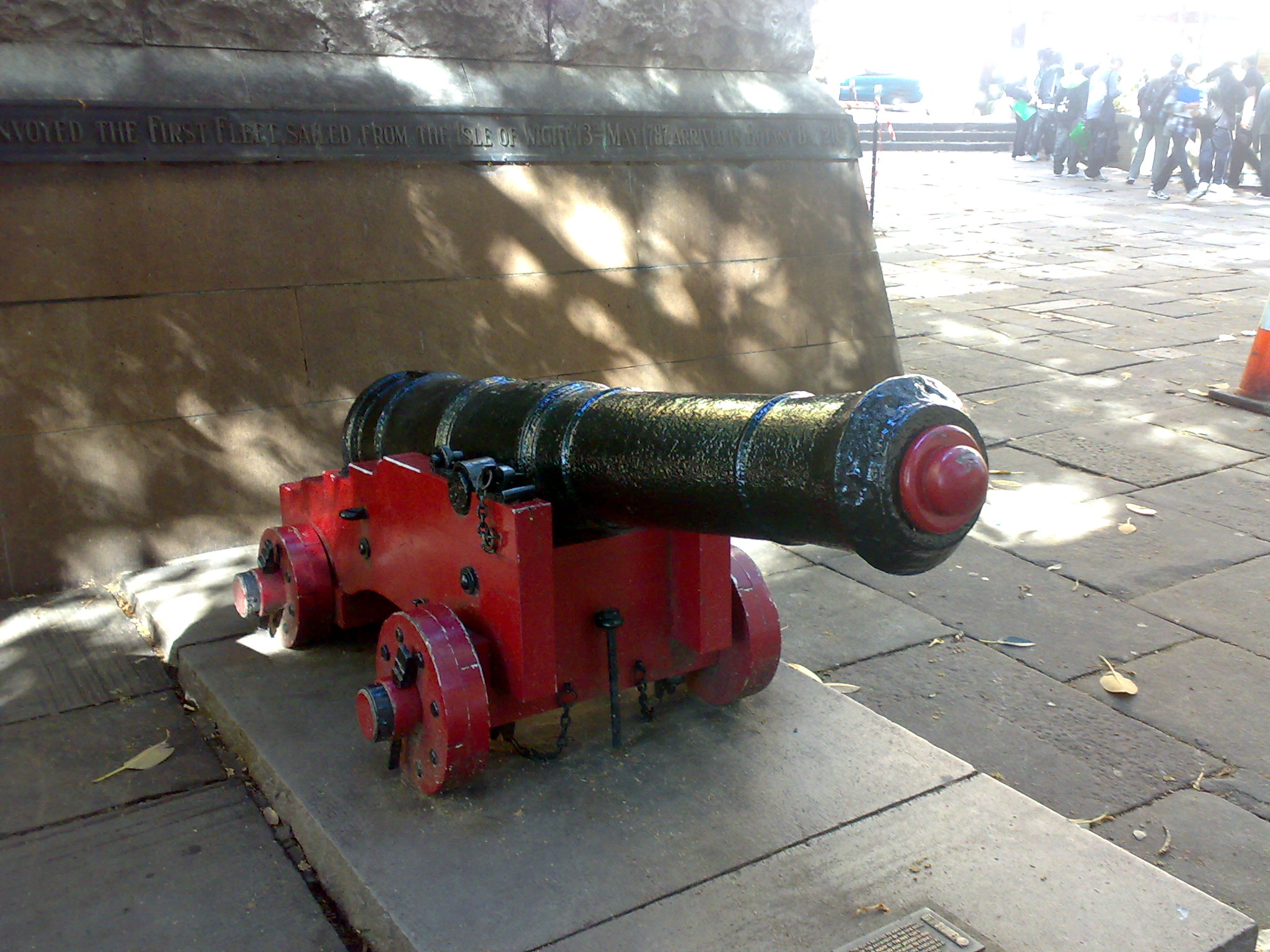
Cannon from HMS Sirius.

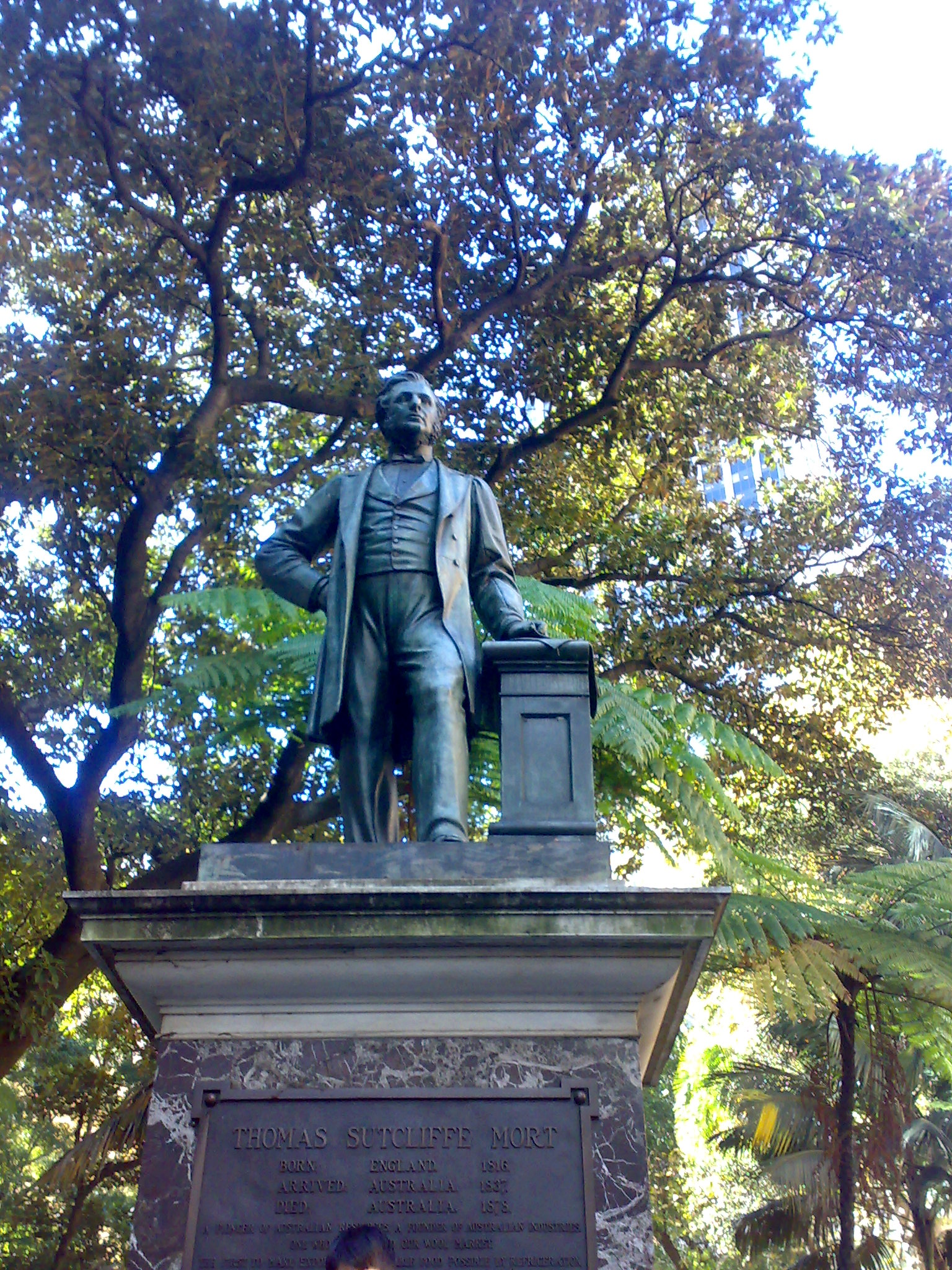
The statue of Thomas Mort that was unveiled in 1883

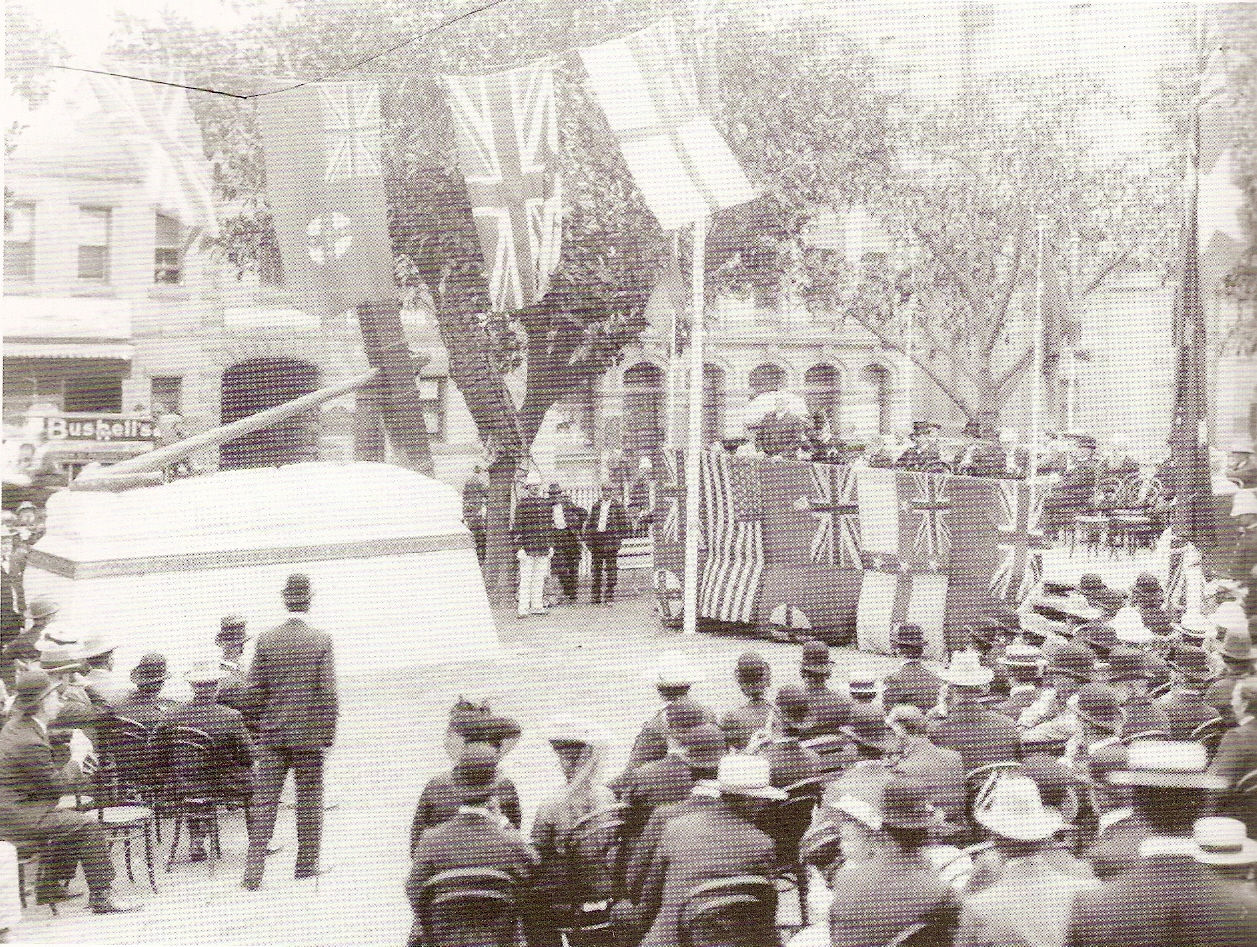
Unveiling of HMS Sirius' anchor at Macquarie Place in 1907

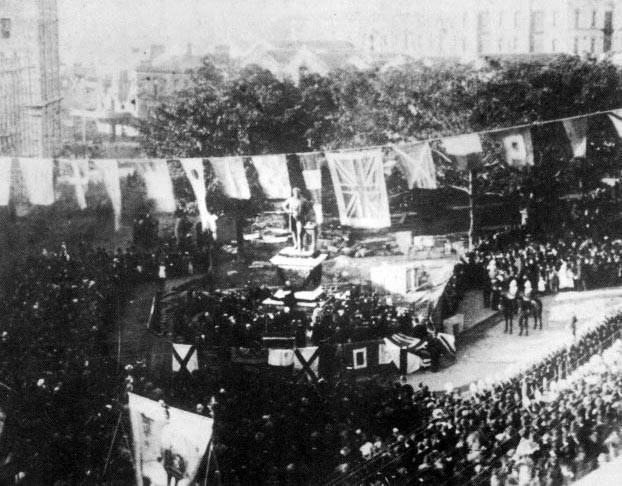
Unveiling of the Thomas Mort statue in Macquarie Place, 1883

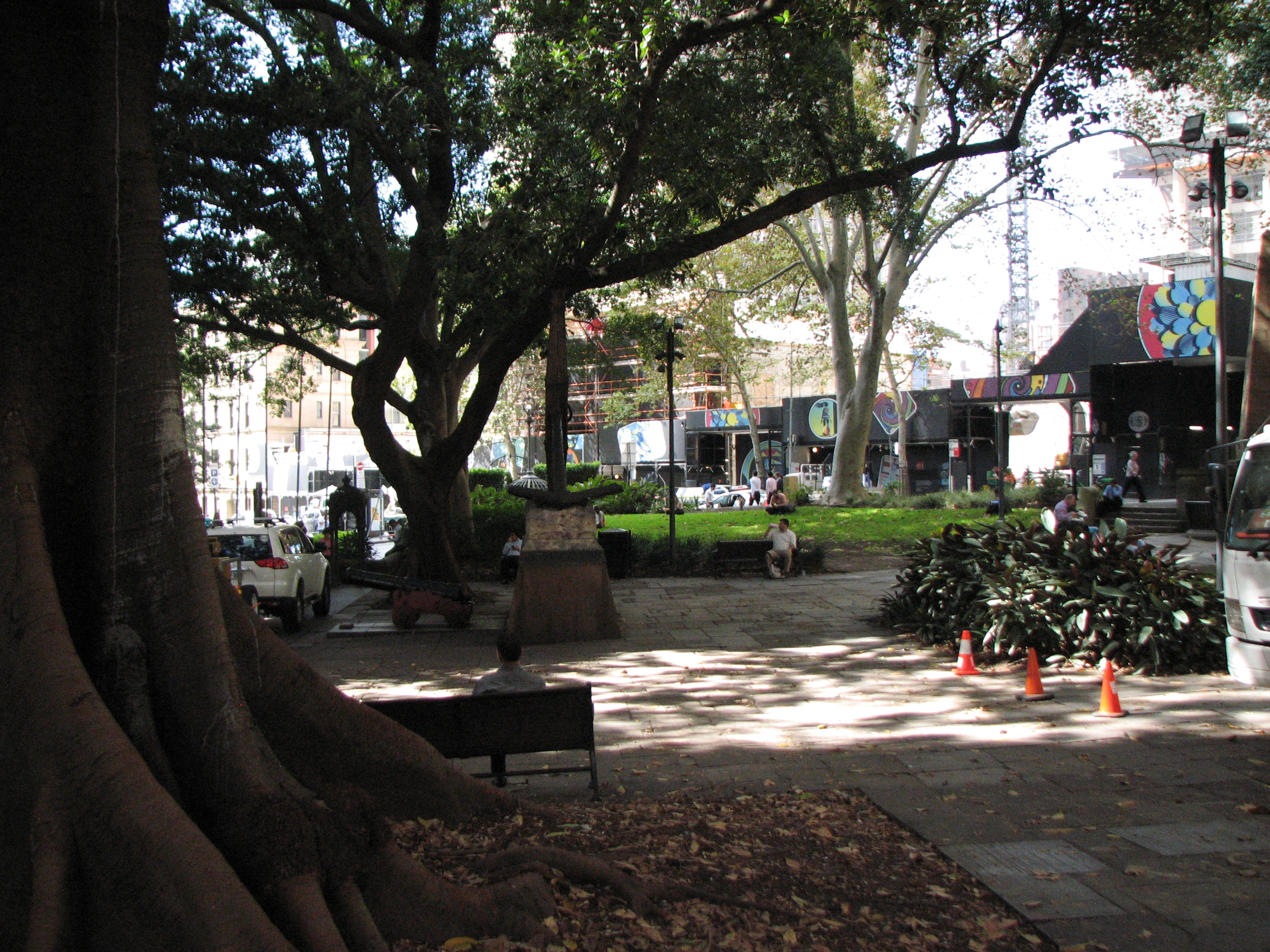
Macquarie Place in 2019

== See also ==
- History of Sydney
