= Kahibah Public School =

Location
- Frith Street, Kahibah, New South Wales; Australia
- Coordinates: 32°57′59″S 151°42′49″E

Information
- Type: Government-funded co-educational primary day school
- Motto: Progress With Honour
- Established: 1938; 88 years ago
- School district: Glenrock
- Educational authority: New South Wales Department of Education
- Years: K–6
- Enrolment: 287 (2012)
- Campus type: Suburban
- Website: kahibah-p.schools.nsw.gov.au

Kahibah Public School is a government-funded co-educational primary day school, located in Kahibah, a suburb of Lake Macquarie, New South Wales, Australia. Established in 1938 in the Kahibah Memorial Hall, it moved to its current location in 1954. The school caters for students from Kindergarten to Year 6 with a total enrolment of approximately 287.

The school is a registered war memorial.

== History ==
In 1938 Kahibah Public School was established as an Infants (early primary) school in the Kahibah Memorial Hall with an initial enrolment of 33 students and with a single teacher. By 1949 the enrolment had risen to 50 however the school still had only one teacher and a new, more permanent school that catered for all primary ages was needed.

After closing for a short time in 1951, with most students transferred to the school at Charlestown, it reopened as a Primary school in 1952.

In 1953 land at the present site was acquired and the school opened with four buildings in 1954. In 1955 a further acre of land was acquired and another two buildings were built and occupied by October of that year although the school was not officially opened until 11 August 1956. Two more buildings were added to the school in 1960.

After reaching an enrolment peak of approximately 450 in the mid-1970s enrolment has reduced during successive years to the current figure of 252.

== War memorial ==
The Kahibah Memorial Hall (originally called the Soldier's Memorial Hall) was opened in 1922 on land approximately 270 m (886 ft) north-west of the current site of the school. When it was demolished in 1996 to make way for home units proceeds of the land sale were paid to the Kahibah Public School P&C Association. In 2004 the Kahibah World War I and World War II honour rolls from the hall were transferred to the Kahibah Public School Memorial Hall for display and safekeeping and the school was registered officially as a war memorial.

== See also ==
- List of government schools in New South Wales
- Education in Australia
