= Highfields, New South Wales =

Highfields Greater Newcastle, New South Wales
- Coordinates: 32°56′56″S 151°42′04″E
- Population: 936 (2021 census)
  - Density: 2,340/km^{2} (6,100/sq mi)
- Postcode(s): 2289
- Area: 0.4 km^{2} (0.2 sq mi)
- Location: 8 km (5 mi) WSW of Newcastle; 2 km (1 mi) NE of Charlestown
- LGA(s): City of Lake Macquarie
- Parish: Kahibah
- State electorate(s): Charlestown
- Federal division(s): Shortland
Suburbs around Highfields:
Adamstown Heights	Adamstown Heights	Merewether
Adamstown Heights	Highfields	Merewether
Charlestown	Kahibah	Whitebridge

Highfields is a residential suburb of Lake Macquarie, New South Wales, Australia, located 8 kilometres (5 mi) west-southwest of Newcastle's central business district near the Charlestown town centre.

== History ==
The Aboriginal people, in this area, the Awabakal, were the first people of this land.
