= Whitebridge, New South Wales =

Whitebridge
- Suburb
- Coordinates: 32°58′55″S 151°43′5″E
- Country: Australia
- State: New South Wales
- City: Newcastle
- LGA: City of Lake Macquarie
- Location: 11 km (6.8 mi) SW of Newcastle; 2 km (1.2 mi) E of Charlestown
- Established: 1888

Government
  - State electorate: Charlestown
  - Federal division: Shortland

Area
  - Total: 5.9 km^{2} (2.3 sq mi)

Population
  - Total: 2,900 (2021 census)
  - Density: 492/km^{2} (1,270/sq mi)
- Postcode: 2290
- Parish: Kahibah
Suburbs around Whitebridge
Kahibah	Highfields	Merewether
Charlestown	Whitebridge	Pacific Ocean
Gateshead	Dudley	Pacific Ocean

Whitebridge is a suburb of Lake Macquarie, New South Wales, Australia, 11 kilometres (7 mi) from Newcastle's central business district on the eastern side of Lake Macquarie. It is part of the City of Lake Macquarie local government area.

== History ==
The Awabakal are the traditional people of this area.

The area was named after a white truss bridge that crosses the Belmont Railway Line later replaced by a concrete bridge now part of Dudley Road. Coal mining was started at Whitebridge in 1888 at the Burwood No.3 Colliery. This mine operated for almost a century and was one of Australia's greatest coal producers. It closed in 1982. Whitebridge High School opened in 1963.
