= Great North Walk =

Walking route in New South Wales, Australia

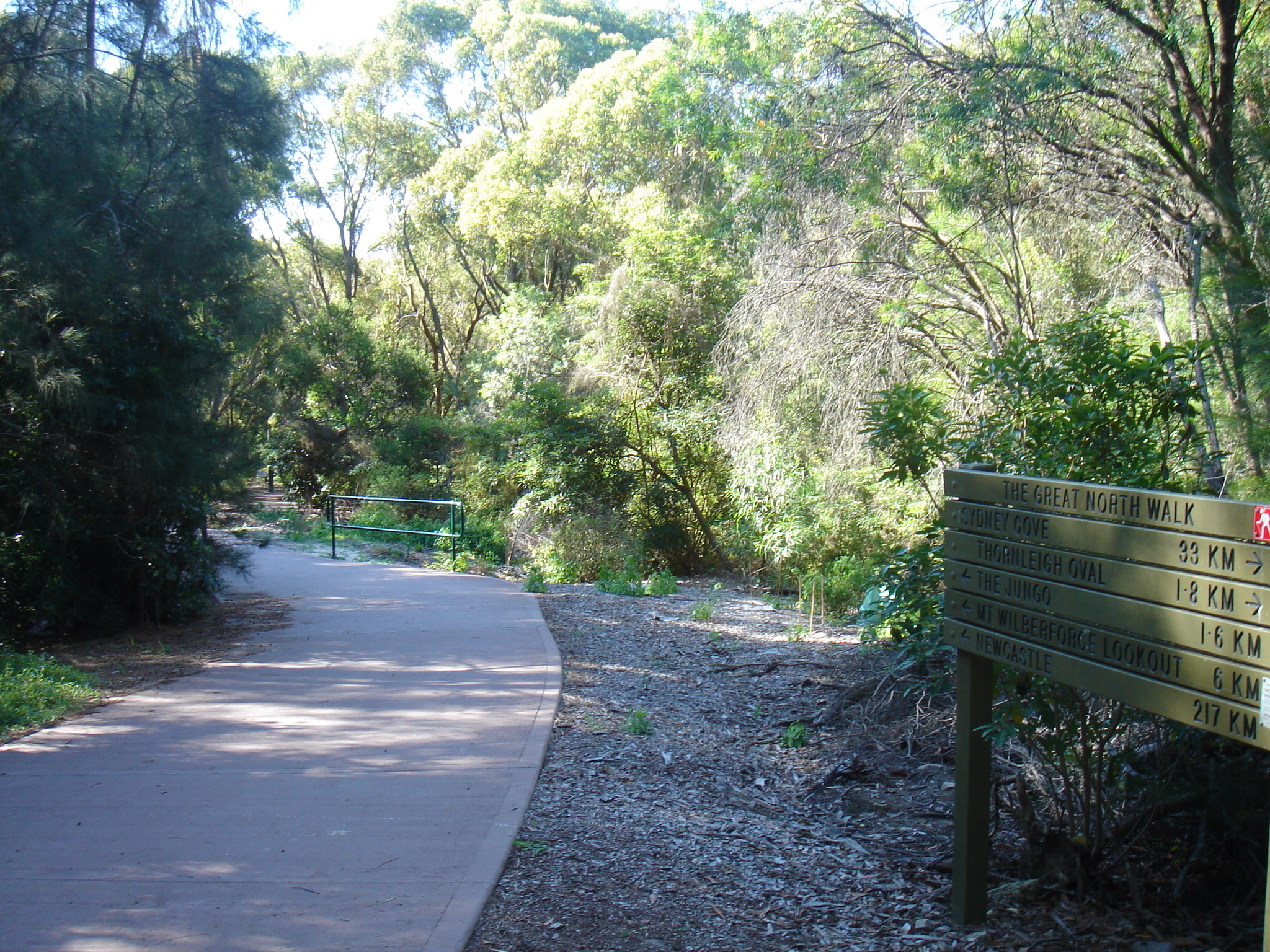
- The Great North Walk at Pennant Hills
- Length: 250 km (160 mi)
- Location: New South Wales, Australia
- Established: 1988
- Trailheads: Macquarie Place, Sydney / Bicentennial Park, Newcastle
- Use: Hiking
- Difficulty: Medium
- Season: All

The Great North Walk is a walking track which runs from Sydney to Newcastle in New South Wales, Australia. The main track, 250 kilometres (160 mi) in length, runs between the Obelisk in Macquarie Place in Sydney to Queens Wharf in Bicentennial Park in Newcastle and is well sign-posted. There are many "side tracks" which link the track to populated areas along the length of the walk. The walk includes a huge variety of wildlife and scenery.

== History ==
The Great North Walk was initiated by Gary McDougall and Leigh Shearer-Heriot. They both planned and marked the original route from Sydney to Newcastle, with access to many linking tracks. Today's Great North Walk is quite true to the original trail. There have been books written about the walk.

The original name for the Great North Walk was the 'Sydney to Hunter Project'. The name 'the Great North Walk' was derived from the first road from the Hunter Valley to Sydney, called the Great North Road. Construction began in 1987 and was completed less than a year later in early 1988, in time for the Australian Bicentennial celebrations. Workers from several countries including China, Thailand and Vietnam were hired by the NSW State Government to complete the track by 1988. A small amount of local controversy followed as the labourers won the contract to construct the track over a local landscaping and environmental business. Claim was made that the contract was only won because it cost as much as three times less than the local bid.

The company, Ning-Pow Australia, who were responsible for providing the labourers for the project, were heavily scrutinised for slow construction and poor treatment of their workers. The track was eventually finished but was of poor quality. Following the bicentennial year, the NSW State Government handed over maintenance responsibility to each sections respective land owners, mainly NSW NSW National Parks & Wildlife Service and State Forests. Under new responsibility, the track was upgraded to a higher quality. In several places the track had to be re-constructed taking completely different routes, because the original had been so terribly built. Eventually, the track was completed to a good standard and remains well maintained in most places.

== Description ==
After its official start in Macquarie Place, the walk continues through the suburb of Hunters Hill, where there are many heritage homes, then arrives at the Lane Cove River. It follows the river through the Lane Cove National Park to Thornleigh, then follows Berowra Creek. Further north, the track crosses over to the Ku-ring-gai Chase National Park before proceeding to Brooklyn, on the Hawkesbury River. The river can be crossed either by train or boat, after which the track proceeds north through Brisbane Water National Park and the Ourimbah Valley before reaching the Watagan State Forest. Further north, the track veers east in the vicinity of Brunkerville and follows the Myall Range for some distance before reaching Teralba, on the southern fringes of Newcastle. It then proceeds to its official finishing point in Newcastle.

In addition to the main track between Sydney and Newcastle, there is an extension that goes north to the Hunter Valley. The extension departs from the main track in the vicinity of Brunkerville, and proceeds along a country road to the village of Paxton, passing abandoned coal mines along the way. From Paxton it proceeds north and follows the Mount View Range, where there are extensive views in the direction of Cessnock. The track then descends the northern end of the range before terminating in the wine-making area of Pokolbin.

The total walk from Sydney to Newcastle takes between 8 and 14 days to complete, with popular camp sites at designated spots along the way. Many of these sites are on ridge tops with no available water supply. Where natural standing water is available, it is not necessarily safe to drink and should be treated before use.

It is not necessary to do the walk in one go; individual sections can be completed easily as day walks. The track is often close to the Main North railway line, providing convenient rail access at a number of points. Some early sections in Sydney are through local suburbs on sealed roads. There are more than a dozen ancient Aboriginal rock art sites along the route. The best time to take this walk is late autumn, winter and spring. Summer is extremely hot and should be avoided, particularly if bushfire risk is high.

== Map ==
Overview map showing the Great North Walk route with distances and amenities.

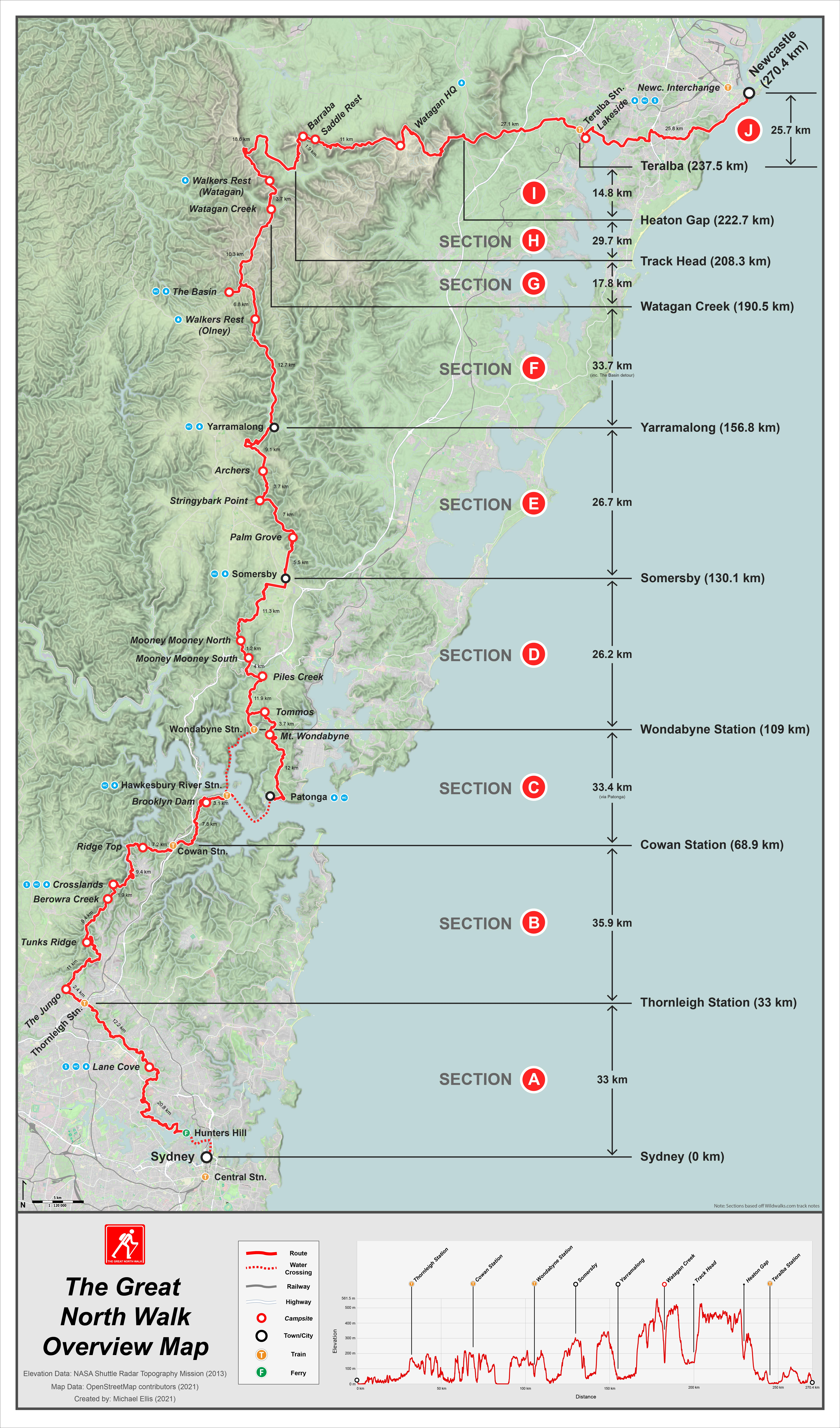

== Terrain profile ==
The terrain profile of the Great North Walk as of the end of 2010.
(click the image to view in higher resolution)
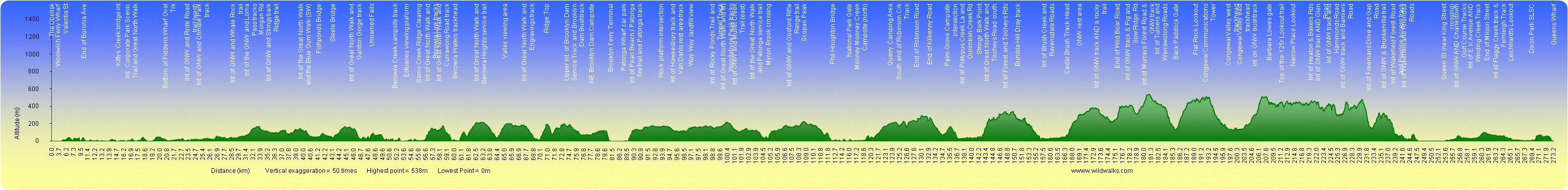

== Gallery ==
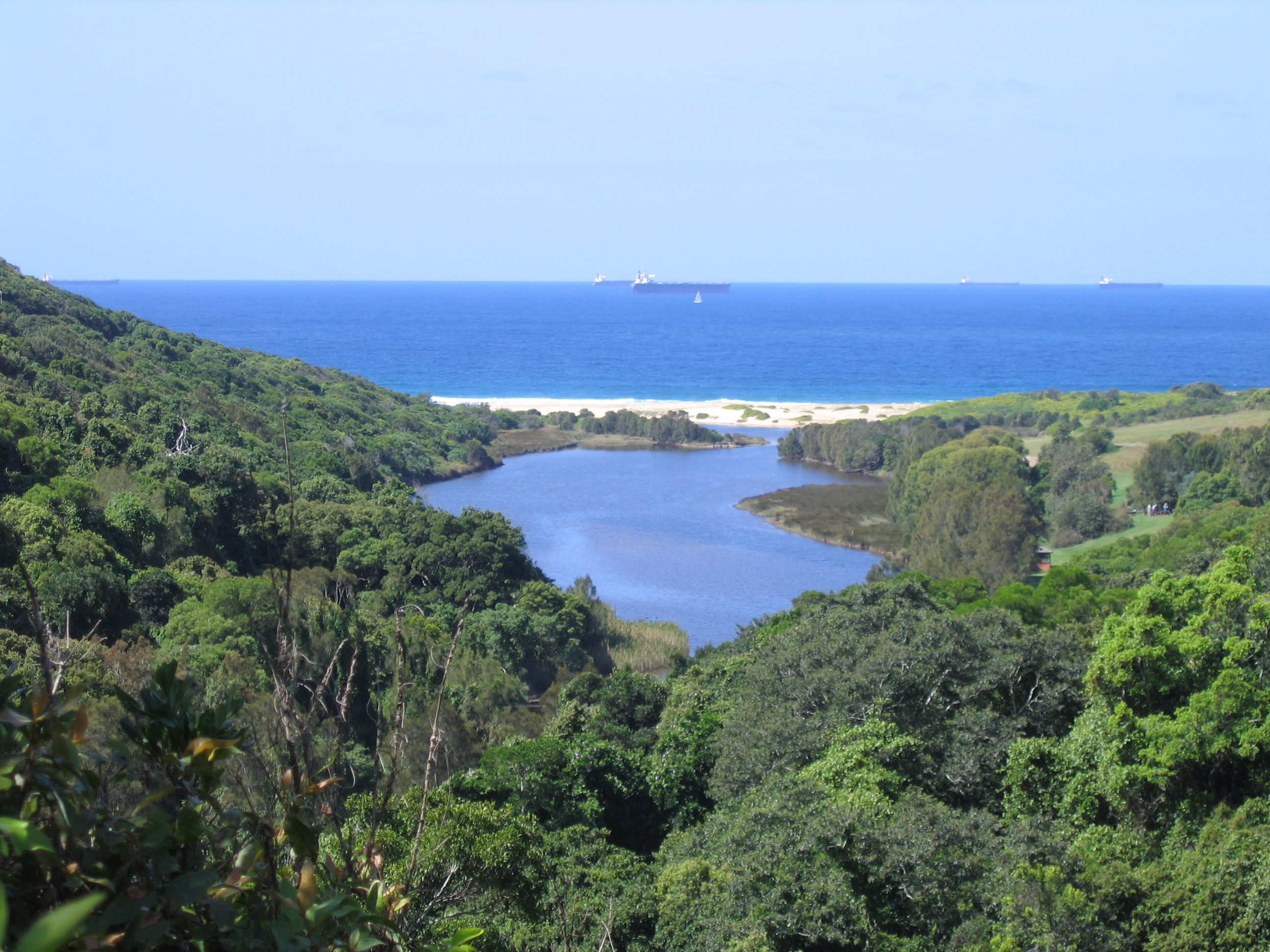
Looking east across Glenrock Lagoon from Leichhardt's Lookout

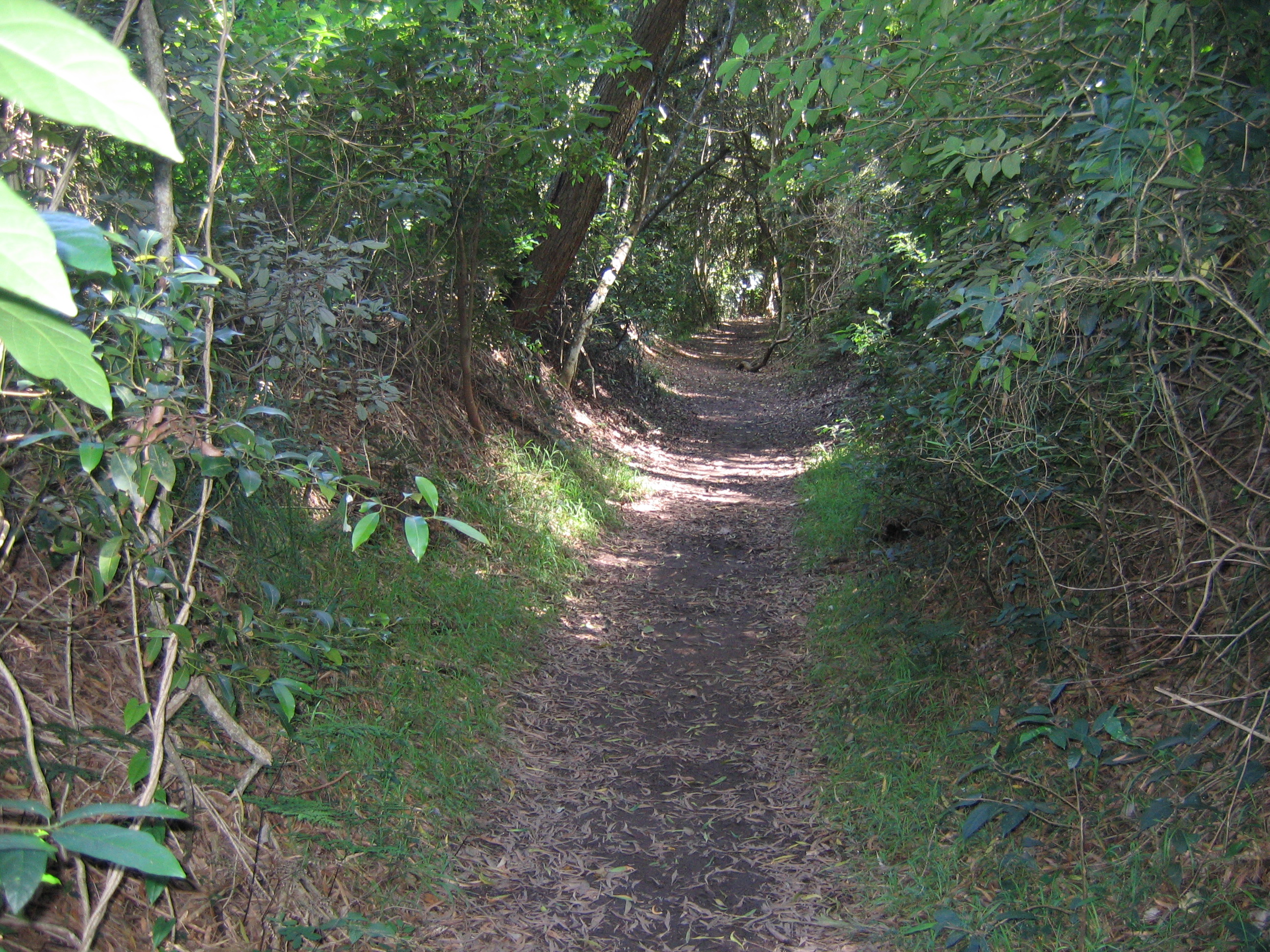
The Yuelarbah Track near Glenrock Lagoon, where the track passes through an old coal railway cutting.

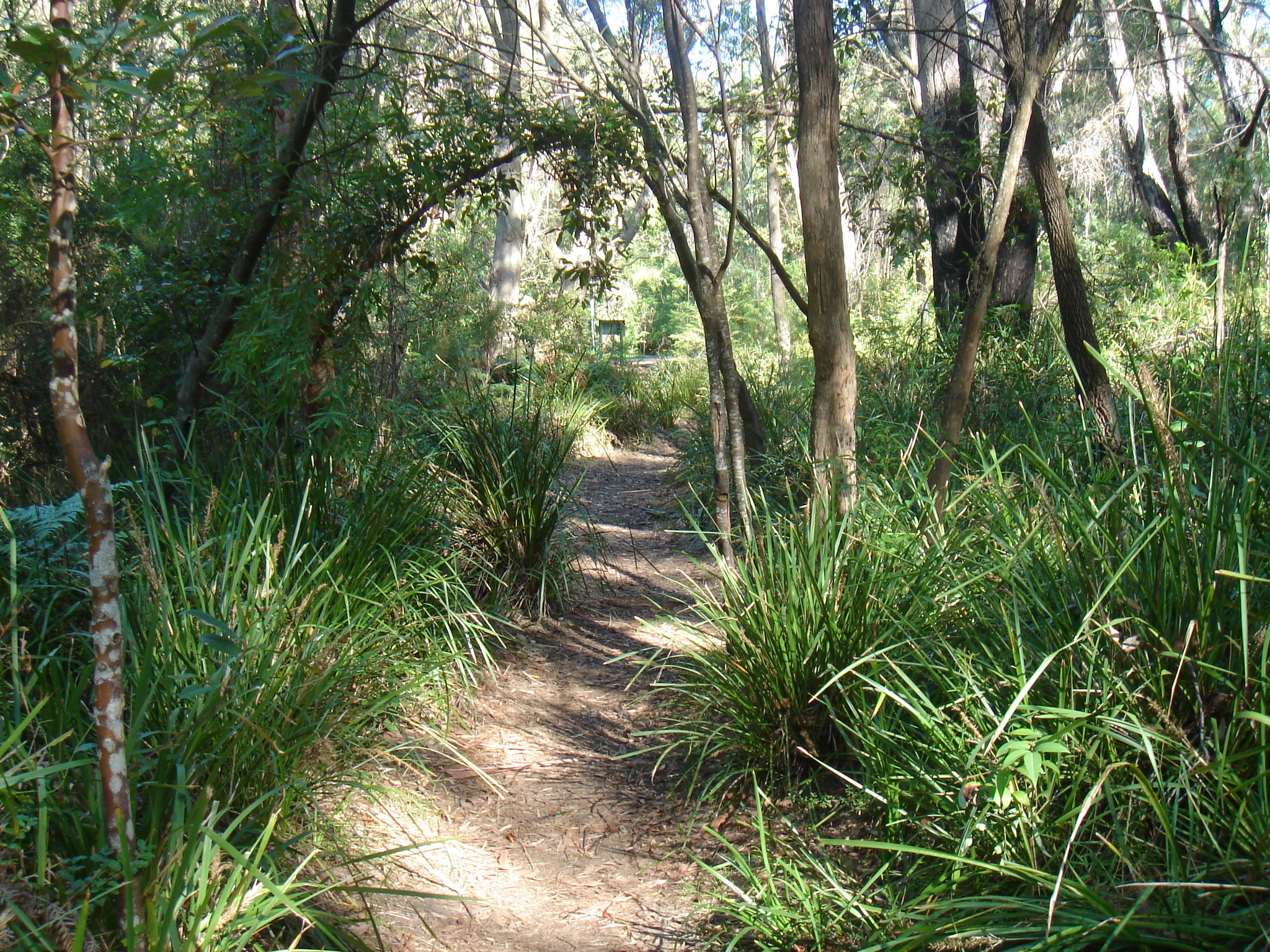
The Great North Walk at 34 kilometres (21 mi) from Macquarie Place, Sydney. The trail here follows the creek along the Berowra Valley.

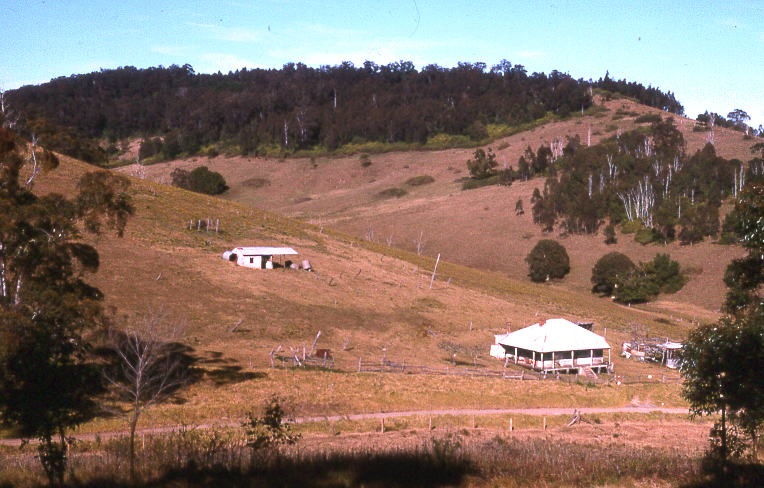
Properties near the Great North Walk where it passes along the Mount View Range, Hunter Valley
